= Oktyabrsky, Russia =

Oktyabrsky (Russian: Октя́брьский; masculine), Oktyabrskaya (Октя́брьская; feminine) or Oktyabrskoye (Октя́брьское; neuter) is the name of several inhabited localities in Russia.

== Modern localities ==
=== Republic of Adygea ===
As of 2012, one rural locality in the Republic of Adygea bears this name:

- Oktyabrsky, Republic of Adygea, a khutor in Maykopsky District; 44°38′N 40°17′E

=== Altai Krai ===
As of 2012, nine rural localities in Altai Krai bear this name:

- Oktyabrsky, Aleysky District, Altai Krai, a settlement in Aleysky Selsoviet of Aleysky District; 52°21′N 82°46′E
- Oktyabrsky, Kamensky District, Altai Krai, a settlement in Prigorodny Selsoviet of Kamensky District; 53°43′N 81°8′E
- Oktyabrsky, Kulundinsky District, Altai Krai, a settlement in Oktyabrsky Selsoviet of Kulundinsky District; 52°34′N 78°52′E
- Oktyabrsky, Kytmanovsky District, Altai Krai (or Oktyabrskoye), a settlement in Oktyabrsky Selsoviet of Kytmanovsky District; 53°17′N 85°20′E
- Oktyabrsky, Suyetsky District, Altai Krai, a settlement in Verkh-Suyetsky Selsoviet of Suyetsky District; 53°19′N 79°55′E
- Oktyabrsky, Troitsky District, Altai Krai, a settlement in Gordeyevsky Selsoviet of Troitsky District; 53°7′N 84°40′E
- Oktyabrsky, Zmeinogorsky District, Altai Krai, a settlement in Oktyabrsky Selsoviet of Zmeinogorsky District; 51°17′N 81°43′E
- Oktyabrsky, Zonalny District, Altai Krai, a settlement in Oktyabrsky Selsoviet of Zonalny District; 52°44′N 85°1′E
- Oktyabrskoye, Altai Krai (or Oktyabrsky), a selo in Sibirsky Selsoviet of Pervomaysky District; 53°34′N 83°51′E

=== Altai Republic ===
As of 2012, one rural locality in the Altai Republic bears this name:

- Oktyabrskoye, Altai Republic, a settlement in Gorbunovskoye Rural Settlement of Ust-Koksinsky District; 50°14′N 85°44′E

=== Amur Oblast ===
As of 2012, two rural localities in Amur Oblast bear this name:

- Oktyabrsky, Amur Oblast, a selo in Oktyabrsky Rural Settlement of Zeysky District
- Oktyabrskoye, Amur Oblast, a selo in Kovrizhsky Rural Settlement of Konstantinovsky District

=== Arkhangelsk Oblast ===
As of 2012, one urban locality in Arkhangelsk Oblast bears this name:

- Oktyabrsky, Arkhangelsk Oblast, a work settlement in Ustyansky District

=== Astrakhan Oblast ===
As of 2012, one rural locality in Astrakhan Oblast bears this name:

- Oktyabrsky, Astrakhan Oblast, a settlement in Lebyazhinsky Selsoviet of Kamyzyaksky District; 45°52′N 48°7′E

=== Republic of Bashkortostan ===
As of 2012, seven inhabited localities in the Republic of Bashkortostan bear this name:

Urban localities

- Oktyabrsky, Republic of Bashkortostan, a city incorporated as a city of republic significance; 54°29′N 53°28′E

Rural localities

- Oktyabrsky, Duvansky District, Republic of Bashkortostan, a village in Duvansky Selsoviet of Duvansky District; 55°37′N 57°29′E
- Oktyabrsky, Iglinsky District, Republic of Bashkortostan (or Oktyabrskoye), a village in Nadezhdinsky Selsoviet of Iglinsky District; 54°51′N 56°45′E
- Oktyabrsky, Karaidelsky District, Republic of Bashkortostan, a village in Kirzinsky Selsoviet of Karaidelsky District; 55°41′N 56°50′E
- Oktyabrsky, Ufimsky District, Republic of Bashkortostan, a selo in Shemyaksky Selsoviet of Ufimsky District; 54°46′N 55°29′E
- Oktyabrskoye, Iglinsky District, Republic of Bashkortostan (or Oktyabrsky), a village in Tavtimanovsky Selsoviet of Iglinsky District; 54°55′N 56°40′E
- Oktyabrskoye, Sterlitamaksky District, Republic of Bashkortostan, a selo in Oktyabrsky Selsoviet of Sterlitamaksky District; 53°36′N 55°37′E

=== Belgorod Oblast ===
As of 2012, two inhabited localities in Belgorod Oblast bear this name:

Urban localities

- Oktyabrsky, Belgorodsky District, Belgorod Oblast, a settlement in Belgorodsky District; 50°26′N 36°21′E

Rural localities

- Oktyabrsky, Gubkinsky District, Belgorod Oblast, a khutor in Gubkinsky District; 51°11′N 37°5′E

=== Bryansk Oblast ===
As of 2012, five rural localities in Bryansk Oblast bear this name:

- Oktyabrsky, Bryansky District, Bryansk Oblast, a settlement in Zhurinichsky Rural Administrative Okrug of Bryansky District; 53°18′N 34°44′E
- Oktyabrsky, Pochepsky District, Bryansk Oblast, a settlement in Baklansky Rural Administrative Okrug of Pochepsky District; 52°44′N 33°17′E
- Oktyabrsky, Unechsky District, Bryansk Oblast, a settlement in Ivaytensky Rural Administrative Okrug of Unechsky District; 52°48′N 33°2′E
- Oktyabrskoye, Bryansky District, Bryansk Oblast, a selo in Dobrunsky Rural Administrative Okrug of Bryansky District; 53°13′N 34°13′E
- Oktyabrskoye, Surazhsky District, Bryansk Oblast, a selo in Vlazovichsky Rural Administrative Okrug of Surazhsky District; 53°2′N 32°12′E

=== Republic of Buryatia ===
As of 2012, one rural locality in the Republic of Buryatia bears this name:

- Oktyabrsky, Republic of Buryatia, a settlement in Bolshekudarinsky Selsoviet of Kyakhtinsky District

=== Chechen Republic ===
As of 2012, two rural localities in the Chechen Republic bear this name:

- Oktyabrskoye, Groznensky District, Chechen Republic, a selo in Oktyabrskaya Rural Administration of Groznensky District
- Oktyabrskoye, Vedensky District, Chechen Republic, a selo in Vedenskaya Rural Administration of Vedensky District

=== Chelyabinsk Oblast ===
As of 2012, seven rural localities in Chelyabinsk Oblast bear this name:

- Oktyabrsky, Miass, Chelyabinsk Oblast, a settlement under the administrative jurisdiction of the City of Miass
- Oktyabrsky, Bredinsky District, Chelyabinsk Oblast, a settlement in Belokamensky Selsoviet of Bredinsky District
- Oktyabrsky, Kizilsky District, Chelyabinsk Oblast, a settlement in Granitny Selsoviet of Kizilsky District
- Oktyabrsky, Krasnoarmeysky District, Chelyabinsk Oblast, a settlement in Berezovsky Selsoviet of Krasnoarmeysky District
- Oktyabrsky, Kusinsky District, Chelyabinsk Oblast, a settlement in Zlokazovsky Selsoviet of Kusinsky District
- Oktyabrsky, Uysky District, Chelyabinsk Oblast, a settlement in Uysky Selsoviet of Uysky District
- Oktyabrskoye, Chelyabinsk Oblast, a selo in Oktyabrsky Selsoviet of Oktyabrsky District

=== Chuvash Republic ===
As of 2012, two rural localities in the Chuvash Republic bear this name:

- Oktyabrskoye, Mariinsko-Posadsky District, Chuvash Republic, a selo in Oktyabrskoye Rural Settlement of Mariinsko-Posadsky District
- Oktyabrskoye, Poretsky District, Chuvash Republic, a selo in Oktyabrskoye Rural Settlement of Poretsky District

=== Republic of Crimea ===
As of 2012, four inhabited localities in Republic of Crimea bear this name:

Urban localities

- Oktyabrskoye, Krasnogvardeysky District, Republic of Crimea, an urban-type settlement in Krasnogvardeysky District

Rural localities

- Oktyabrskoye, Leninsky District, Republic of Crimea, a selo in Leninsky District
- Oktyabrskoye, Pervomaysky District, Republic of Crimea, a selo in Pervomaysky District
- Oktyabrskoye, Sovetsky District, Republic of Crimea, a selo in Sovetsky District

=== Republic of Dagestan ===
As of 2012, two rural localities in the Republic of Dagestan bear this name:

- Oktyabrskoye, Khasavyurtovsky District, Republic of Dagestan, a selo in Oktyabrsky Selsoviet of Khasavyurtovsky District; 43°29′N 46°27′E
- Oktyabrskoye, Kizlyarsky District, Republic of Dagestan, a selo in Kizlyarsky Selsoviet of Kizlyarsky District; 43°56′N 46°46′E

=== Irkutsk Oblast ===
As of 2015, four inhabited localities in Irkutsk Oblast bear this name:

Urban localities

- Oktyabrsky, Chunsky District, Irkutsk Oblast, a work settlement in Chunsky District

Rural localities

- Oktyabrsky, Kuytunsky District, Irkutsk Oblast, a settlement in Kuytunsky District
- Oktyabrsky, Nizhneudinsky District, Irkutsk Oblast, an area in Nizhneudinsky District
- Oktyabrsky, Usolsky District, Irkutsk Oblast, a settlement in Usolsky District

=== Ivanovo Oblast ===
As of 2012, three rural localities in Ivanovo Oblast bear this name:

- Oktyabrsky, Kineshemsky District, Ivanovo Oblast, a selo in Kineshemsky District
- Oktyabrsky, Komsomolsky District, Ivanovo Oblast, a selo in Komsomolsky District
- Oktyabrsky, Zavolzhsky District, Ivanovo Oblast, a selo in Zavolzhsky District

=== Jewish Autonomous Oblast ===
As of 2012, one rural locality in the Jewish Autonomous Oblast bears this name:

- Oktyabrskoye, Jewish Autonomous Oblast, a selo in Leninsky District

=== Kabardino-Balkar Republic ===
As of 2012, two rural localities in the Kabardino-Balkar Republic bear this name:

- Oktyabrskoye, Maysky District, Kabardino-Balkar Republic (or Oktyabrsky), a selo in Maysky District; 43°41′N 44°2′E
- Oktyabrskoye, Zolsky District, Kabardino-Balkar Republic, a selo in Zolsky District; 43°54′N 43°9′E

=== Kaliningrad Oblast ===
As of 2012, four rural localities in Kaliningrad Oblast bear this name:

- Oktyabrskoye, Bagrationovsky District, Kaliningrad Oblast, a settlement in Pogranichny Rural Okrug of Bagrationovsky District
- Oktyabrskoye, Polessky District, Kaliningrad Oblast, a settlement in Zalesovsky Rural Okrug of Polessky District
- Oktyabrskoye, Pravdinsky District, Kaliningrad Oblast, a settlement under the administrative jurisdiction of the town of district significance of Pravdinsk in Pravdinsky District
- Oktyabrskoye, Slavsky District, Kaliningrad Oblast, a settlement in Timiryazevsky Rural Okrug of Slavsky District

=== Republic of Kalmykia ===
As of 2012, three rural localities in the Republic of Kalmykia bear this name:

- Oktyabrsky, Priyutnensky District, Republic of Kalmykia, a settlement in Oktyabrskaya Rural Administration of Priyutnensky District; 46°19′N 43°7′E
- Oktyabrsky, Yashaltinsky District, Republic of Kalmykia, a settlement in Oktyabrskaya Rural Administration of Yashaltinsky District; 46°11′N 42°48′E
- Oktyabrsky, Yustinsky District, Republic of Kalmykia, a settlement in Yustinskaya Rural Administration of Yustinsky District; 47°2′N 46°11′E

=== Kaluga Oblast ===
As of 2012, one rural locality in Kaluga Oblast bears this name:

- Oktyabrsky, Kaluga Oblast, a settlement in Ferzikovsky District

=== Kamchatka Krai ===
As of 2012, one rural locality in Kamchatka Krai bears this name:

- Oktyabrsky, Kamchatka Krai, a settlement in Ust-Bolsheretsky District

=== Karachay-Cherkess Republic ===
As of 2012, one rural locality in the Karachay-Cherkess Republic bears this name:

- Oktyabrsky, Karachay-Cherkess Republic, a settlement in Prikubansky District; 44°16′N 42°30′E

=== Republic of Karelia ===
As of 2012, one rural locality in the Republic of Karelia bears this name:

- Oktyabrskaya, Republic of Karelia, a village in Pudozhsky District

=== Kemerovo Oblast ===
As of 2012, six rural localities in Kemerovo Oblast bear this name:

- Oktyabrsky, Belovsky District, Kemerovo Oblast, a settlement in Bekovskaya Rural Territory of Belovsky District; 54°22′N 86°15′E
- Oktyabrsky, Prokopyevsky District, Kemerovo Oblast, a settlement in Kuzbasskaya Rural Territory of Prokopyevsky District; 54°16′N 86°47′E
- Oktyabrsky, Promyshlennovsky District, Kemerovo Oblast, a settlement in Kalinkinskaya Rural Territory of Promyshlennovsky District; 54°59′N 85°48′E
- Oktyabrsky, Topkinsky District, Kemerovo Oblast, a settlement in Zarubinskaya Rural Territory of Topkinsky District; 55°19′N 85°36′E
- Oktyabrsky, Tyazhinsky District, Kemerovo Oblast, a settlement in Novovostochnaya Rural Territory of Tyazhinsky District; 56°10′N 88°25′E
- Oktyabrsky, Yashkinsky District, Kemerovo Oblast, a settlement in Polomoshinskaya Rural Territory of Yashkinsky District; 55°47′N 85°7′E

=== Khabarovsk Krai ===
As of 2012, three inhabited localities in Khabarovsk Krai bear this name:

Urban localities

- Oktyabrsky, Vaninsky District, Khabarovsk Krai, a work settlement in Vaninsky District
  - The former Postovaya (air base) is nearby.

Rural localities

- Oktyabrsky, Komsomolsky District, Khabarovsk Krai, a settlement in Komsomolsky District
- Oktyabrsky, imeni Poliny Osipenko District, Khabarovsk Krai, a settlement in imeni Poliny Osipenko District

=== Khanty-Mansi Autonomous Okrug ===
As of 2012, one urban locality in Khanty-Mansi Autonomous Okrug bears this name:

- Oktyabrskoye, Khanty-Mansi Autonomous Okrug, an urban-type settlement in Oktyabrsky District

=== Kirov Oblast ===
As of 2012, eight rural localities in Kirov Oblast bear this name:

- Oktyabrsky, Falyonsky District, Kirov Oblast, a settlement in Medvezhensky Rural Okrug of Falyonsky District; 58°15′N 51°30′E
- Oktyabrsky, Murashinsky District, Kirov Oblast, a settlement in Bezbozhnikovsky Rural Okrug of Murashinsky District; 59°27′N 48°56′E
- Oktyabrsky, Slobodskoy District, Kirov Oblast, a settlement in Oktyabrsky Rural Okrug of Slobodskoy District; 58°52′N 50°26′E
- Oktyabrsky, Sovetsky District, Kirov Oblast, a settlement in Rodyginsky Rural Okrug of Sovetsky District; 57°33′N 48°59′E
- Oktyabrsky, Zuyevsky District, Kirov Oblast, a settlement in Oktyabrsky Rural Okrug of Zuyevsky District; 58°8′N 51°9′E
- Oktyabrskoye, Kirov Oblast (or Oktyabrskaya), a selo in Yumsky Rural Okrug of Svechinsky District; 58°25′N 47°36′E
- Oktyabrskaya (railway station), Lesnoy, Verkhnekamsky District, Kirov Oblast, a railway station under the administrative jurisdiction of Lesnoy Urban-Type Settlement in Verkhnekamsky District; 60°7′N 52°2′E
- Oktyabrskaya (village), Lesnoy, Verkhnekamsky District, Kirov Oblast, a village under the administrative jurisdiction of Lesnoy Urban-Type Settlement in Verkhnekamsky District; 60°6′N 52°1′E

=== Komi Republic ===
As of 2012, one urban locality in the Komi Republic bears this name:

- Oktyabrsky, Komi Republic, an urban-type settlement under the administrative jurisdiction of Severny Urban-Type Settlement Administrative Territory under the administrative jurisdiction of the city of republic significance of Vorkuta; 67°34′N 64°8′E

=== Kostroma Oblast ===
As of 2012, two rural localities in Kostroma Oblast bear this name:

- Oktyabrsky, Kologrivsky District, Kostroma Oblast, a settlement in Ileshevskoye Settlement of Kologrivsky District; 59°2′N 44°3′E
- Oktyabrsky, Manturovsky District, Kostroma Oblast, a settlement in Oktyabrskoye Settlement of Manturovsky District; 58°19′N 44°19′E

=== Krasnodar Krai ===
As of 2012, twenty rural localities in Krasnodar Krai bear this name:

- Oktyabrsky, Goryachy Klyuch, Krasnodar Krai, a settlement in Kutaissky Rural Okrug under the administrative jurisdiction of the Town of Goryachy Klyuch; 44°33′N 39°13′E
- Oktyabrsky, Krasnodar, Krasnodar Krai, a khutor in Kalininsky Rural Okrug under the administrative jurisdiction of Prikubansky Okrug under the administrative jurisdiction of the City of Krasnodar; 45°12′N 39°5′E
- Oktyabrsky, Kavkazsky District, Krasnodar Krai, a settlement in Mirskoy Rural Okrug of Kavkazsky District; 45°29′N 40°27′E
- Oktyabrsky, Krasnoarmeysky District, Krasnodar Krai, a settlement in Oktyabrsky Rural Okrug of Krasnoarmeysky District; 45°15′N 38°18′E
- Oktyabrsky, Kurganinsky District, Krasnodar Krai, a settlement in Oktyabrsky Rural Okrug of Kurganinsky District; 45°4′N 40°43′E
- Oktyabrsky, Kushchyovsky District, Krasnodar Krai, a settlement in Pervomaysky Rural Okrug of Kushchyovsky District; 46°21′N 39°37′E
- Oktyabrsky, Leningradsky District, Krasnodar Krai, a settlement in Novoumansky Rural Okrug of Leningradsky District; 46°14′N 39°9′E
- Oktyabrsky, Novopokrovsky District, Krasnodar Krai, a settlement in Nezamayevsky Rural Okrug of Novopokrovsky District; 46°8′N 40°24′E
- Oktyabrsky, Pavlovsky District, Krasnodar Krai, a settlement in Srednechelbassky Rural Okrug of Pavlovsky District; 45°59′N 39°38′E
- Oktyabrsky, Primorsko-Akhtarsky District, Krasnodar Krai, a settlement in Olginsky Rural Okrug of Primorsko-Akhtarsky District; 45°57′N 38°29′E
- Oktyabrsky, Seversky District, Krasnodar Krai, a settlement under the administrative jurisdiction of Chernomorsky Settlement Okrug in Seversky District; 44°51′N 38°28′E
- Oktyabrsky, Tbilissky District, Krasnodar Krai, a settlement in Tbilissky Rural Okrug of Tbilissky District; 45°28′N 40°8′E
- Oktyabrsky, Temryuksky District, Krasnodar Krai, a settlement under the administrative jurisdiction of the Town of Temryuk in Temryuksky District; 45°16′N 37°20′E
- Oktyabrsky, Timashyovsky District, Krasnodar Krai, a settlement in Poselkovy Rural Okrug of Timashyovsky District; 45°36′N 38°41′E
- Oktyabrsky, Tuapsinsky District, Krasnodar Krai, a settlement in Oktyabrsky Rural Okrug of Tuapsinsky District; 44°19′N 39°20′E
- Oktyabrsky, Ust-Labinsky District, Krasnodar Krai, a khutor under the administrative jurisdiction of the Town of Ust-Labinsk in Ust-Labinsky District; 45°19′N 39°38′E
- Oktyabrsky, Vyselkovsky District, Krasnodar Krai, a settlement in Gazyrsky Rural Okrug of Vyselkovsky District; 45°48′N 39°59′E
- Oktyabrsky, Yeysky District, Krasnodar Krai, a settlement in Yeysky Rural Okrug of Yeysky District; 46°29′N 38°17′E
- Oktyabrskaya, Belorechensky District, Krasnodar Krai (or Oktyabrsky, Oktyabrskoye), a stanitsa in Bzhedukhovsky Rural Okrug of Belorechensky District; 44°51′N 39°37′E
- Oktyabrskaya, Krylovsky District, Krasnodar Krai (or Oktyabrsky), a stanitsa in Oktyabrsky Rural Okrug of Krylovsky District; 46°17′N 39°48′E

=== Krasnoyarsk Krai ===
As of 2012, two rural localities in Krasnoyarsk Krai bear this name:

- Oktyabrsky, Boguchansky District, Krasnoyarsk Krai, a settlement in Oktyabrsky Selsoviet of Boguchansky District
- Oktyabrsky, Idrinsky District, Krasnoyarsk Krai, a settlement in Dobromyslovsky Selsoviet of Idrinsky District

=== Kurgan Oblast ===
As of 2012, two rural localities in Kurgan Oblast bear this name:

- Oktyabrsky, Kurgan Oblast, a settlement in Barinovsky Selsoviet of Shatrovsky District; 56°11′N 65°11′E
- Oktyabrskoye, Kurgan Oblast, a selo in Oktyabrsky Selsoviet of Petukhovsky District; 55°1′N 67°52′E

=== Kursk Oblast ===
As of 2012, four rural localities in Kursk Oblast bear this name:

- Oktyabrsky, Dmitriyevsky District, Kursk Oblast, a settlement in Melovsky Selsoviet of Dmitriyevsky District
- Oktyabrsky, Lgovsky District, Kursk Oblast, a khutor in Gorodensky Selsoviet of Lgovsky District
- Oktyabrskoye, Rylsky District, Kursk Oblast, a selo in Oktyabrsky Selsoviet of Rylsky District
- Oktyabrskoye, Sovetsky District, Kursk Oblast, a selo in Oktyabrsky Selsoviet of Sovetsky District

=== Leningrad Oblast ===
As of 2012, one rural locality in Leningrad Oblast bears this name:

- Oktyabrskoye, Leningrad Oblast, a settlement in Polyanskoye Settlement Municipal Formation of Vyborgsky District; 60°11′N 29°17′E

=== Lipetsk Oblast ===
As of 2012, one rural locality in Lipetsk Oblast bears this name:

- Oktyabrskoye, Lipetsk Oblast, a selo in Oktyabrsky Selsoviet of Usmansky District; 52°18′N 39°43′E

=== Mari El Republic ===
As of 2012, three rural localities in the Mari El Republic bear this name:

- Oktyabrsky, Krasnovolzhsky Rural Okrug, Gornomariysky District, Mari El Republic, a settlement in Krasnovolzhsky Rural Okrug of Gornomariysky District; 56°17′N 46°32′E
- Oktyabrsky, Vilovatovsky Rural Okrug, Gornomariysky District, Mari El Republic, a vyselok in Vilovatovsky Rural Okrug of Gornomariysky District; 56°8′N 46°29′E
- Oktyabrsky, Morkinsky District, Mari El Republic, a settlement in Oktyabrsky Rural Okrug of Morkinsky District; 56°19′N 48°36′E

=== Republic of Mordovia ===
As of 2012, two rural localities in the Republic of Mordovia bear this name:

- Oktyabrsky, Ardatovsky District, Republic of Mordovia, a settlement in Oktyabrsky Selsoviet of Ardatovsky District; 54°54′N 46°13′E
- Oktyabrsky, Ichalkovsky District, Republic of Mordovia, a settlement in Ladsky Selsoviet of Ichalkovsky District; 54°36′N 45°23′E

=== Moscow Oblast ===
As of 2012, five inhabited localities in Moscow Oblast bear this name:

Urban localities

- Oktyabrsky, Lyuberetsky District, Moscow Oblast, a work settlement in Lyuberetsky District; 55°37′N 37°58′E

Rural localities

- Oktyabrsky, Istrinsky District, Moscow Oblast, a settlement in Bukarevskoye Rural Settlement of Istrinsky District; 55°56′N 36°48′E
- Oktyabrsky, Odintsovsky District, Moscow Oblast, a settlement under the administrative jurisdiction of the Town of Golitsyno in Odintsovsky District; 55°35′N 36°59′E
- Oktyabrsky, Stupinsky District, Moscow Oblast, a settlement under the administrative jurisdiction of Mikhnevo Work Settlement in Stupinsky District; 55°9′N 37°56′E
- Oktyabrskoye, Moscow Oblast, a selo in Zarudenskoye Rural Settlement of Kolomensky District; 55°6′N 39°0′E

=== Republic of North Ossetia-Alania ===
As of 2012, two rural localities in the Republic of North Ossetia-Alania bear this name:

- Oktyabrskoye, Mozdoksky District, North Ossetia–Alania, a selo in Tersky Rural Okrug of Mozdoksky District; 43°40′N 44°49′E
- Oktyabrskoye, Prigorodny District, North Ossetia–Alania, a selo in Oktyabrsky Rural Okrug of Prigorodny District; 43°5′N 44°43′E

=== Novgorod Oblast ===
As of 2012, one rural locality in Novgorod Oblast bears this name:

- Oktyabrsky, Novgorod Oblast, a settlement in Kalininskoye Settlement of Moshenskoy District

=== Novosibirsk Oblast ===
As of 2012, five rural localities in Novosibirsk Oblast bear this name:

- Oktyabrsky, Iskitimsky District, Novosibirsk Oblast, a settlement in Iskitimsky District; 54°27′N 82°55′E
- Oktyabrsky, Krasnozyorsky District, Novosibirsk Oblast, a settlement in Krasnozyorsky District; 53°57′N 79°38′E
- Oktyabrsky, Moshkovsky District, Novosibirsk Oblast, a settlement in Moshkovsky District; 55°11′N 83°10′E
- Oktyabrsky, Ust-Tarksky District, Novosibirsk Oblast (or Oktyabrskoye), a settlement in Ust-Tarksky District; 55°56′N 76°8′E
- Oktyabrskoye, Novosibirsk Oblast (or Oktyabrsky), a selo in Karasuksky District; 53°31′N 77°48′E

=== Omsk Oblast ===
As of 2012, four rural localities in Omsk Oblast bear this name:

- Oktyabrsky, Omsky District, Omsk Oblast, a settlement in Kalininsky Rural Okrug of Omsky District; 54°55′N 73°39′E
- Oktyabrsky, Tyukalinsky District, Omsk Oblast, a settlement in Oktyabrsky Rural Okrug of Tyukalinsky District; 55°49′N 72°13′E
- Oktyabrskoye, Gorkovsky District, Omsk Oblast, a selo in Oktyabrsky Rural Okrug of Gorkovsky District; 55°33′N 73°36′E
- Oktyabrskoye, Okoneshnikovsky District, Omsk Oblast, a village in Krasovsky Rural Okrug of Okoneshnikovsky District; 54°59′N 75°8′E

=== Orenburg Oblast ===
As of 2012, five rural localities in Orenburg Oblast bear this name:

- Oktyabrsky, Buguruslansky District, Orenburg Oblast, a settlement in Yelatomsky Selsoviet of Buguruslansky District
- Oktyabrsky, Kvarkensky District, Orenburg Oblast, a settlement in Kvarkensky Selsoviet of Kvarkensky District
- Oktyabrsky, Sorochinsky District, Orenburg Oblast, a settlement in Roshchinsky Selsoviet of Sorochinsky District
- Oktyabrskoye, Oktyabrsky District, Orenburg Oblast, a selo in Oktyabrsky Selsoviet of Oktyabrsky District
- Oktyabrskoye, Severny District, Orenburg Oblast, a selo in Rychkovsky Selsoviet of Severny District

=== Oryol Oblast ===
As of 2012, one rural locality in Oryol Oblast bears this name:

- Oktyabrsky, Oryol Oblast, a settlement in Berezovsky Selsoviet of Dmitrovsky District; 52°22′N 35°1′E

=== Penza Oblast ===
As of 2012, six rural localities in Penza Oblast bear this name:

- Oktyabrsky, Belinsky District, Penza Oblast, a settlement in Studensky Selsoviet of Belinsky District
- Oktyabrsky, Kamensky District, Penza Oblast, a settlement in Fedorovsky Selsoviet of Kamensky District
- Oktyabrsky, Narovchatsky District, Penza Oblast, a settlement in Novopichursky Selsoviet of Narovchatsky District
- Oktyabrskoye, Neverkinsky District, Penza Oblast, a selo in Oktyabrsky Selsoviet of Neverkinsky District
- Oktyabrskoye, Serdobsky District, Penza Oblast, a settlement in Roshchinsky Selsoviet of Serdobsky District
- Oktyabrskaya, Penza Oblast, a village in Krasnopolsky Selsoviet of Penzensky District

=== Perm Krai ===
As of 2012, five inhabited localities in Perm Krai bear this name:

Urban localities

- Oktyabrsky, Oktyabrsky District, Perm Krai, a work settlement in Oktyabrsky District

Rural localities

- Oktyabrsky, Dobryanka, Perm Krai, a settlement under the administrative jurisdiction of the town of krai significance of Dobryanka
- Oktyabrsky, Ilyinsky District, Perm Krai, a settlement in Ilyinsky District
- Oktyabrsky, Kochyovsky District, Perm Krai, a settlement in Kochyovsky District
- Oktyabrsky, Permsky District, Perm Krai, a settlement in Permsky District

=== Primorsky Krai ===
As of 2012, one rural locality in Primorsky Krai bears this name:

- Oktyabrskoye, Primorsky Krai, a selo in Khankaysky District

=== Rostov Oblast ===
As of 2012, six rural localities in Rostov Oblast bear this name:

- Oktyabrsky, Aksaysky District, Rostov Oblast, a settlement in Shchepkinskoye Rural Settlement of Aksaysky District; 47°24′N 39°50′E
- Oktyabrsky, Krasnosulinsky District, Rostov Oblast, a settlement in Udarnikovskoye Rural Settlement of Krasnosulinsky District; 47°56′N 39°57′E
- Oktyabrsky, Millerovsky District, Rostov Oblast, a khutor in Pervomayskoye Rural Settlement of Millerovsky District; 48°58′N 40°28′E
- Oktyabrsky, Rodionovo-Nesvetaysky District, Rostov Oblast, a khutor in Kuteynikovskoye Rural Settlement of Rodionovo-Nesvetaysky District; 47°27′N 39°47′E
- Oktyabrsky, Verkhnedonskoy District, Rostov Oblast, a settlement in Meshkovskoye Rural Settlement of Verkhnedonskoy District; 49°42′N 40°59′E
- Oktyabrskoye, Rostov Oblast, a selo in Gulyay-Borisovskoye Rural Settlement of Zernogradsky District; 46°30′N 40°23′E

=== Ryazan Oblast ===
As of 2012, two inhabited localities in Ryazan Oblast bear this name:

Urban localities

- Oktyabrsky, Ryazan Oblast, a work settlement in Mikhaylovsky District

Rural localities

- Oktyabrskoye, Ryazan Oblast, a selo in Oktyabrsky Rural Okrug of Pronsky District

=== Sakhalin Oblast ===
As of 2012, one rural locality in Sakhalin Oblast bears this name:

- Oktyabrskoye, Sakhalin Oblast, a selo in Dolinsky District

=== Samara Oblast ===
As of 2012, two rural localities in Samara Oblast bear this name:

- Oktyabrsky, Pokhvistnevo, Samara Oblast, a settlement under the administrative jurisdiction of the town of oblast significance of Pokhvistnevo
- Oktyabrsky, Kinelsky District, Samara Oblast, a settlement in Kinelsky District

=== Saratov Oblast ===
As of 2012, seven rural localities in Saratov Oblast bear this name:

- Oktyabrsky, Arkadaksky District, Saratov Oblast, a settlement in Arkadaksky District
- Oktyabrsky, Balashovsky District, Saratov Oblast, a settlement in Balashovsky District
- Oktyabrsky, Dergachyovsky District, Saratov Oblast, a settlement in Dergachyovsky District
- Oktyabrsky, Krasnopartizansky District, Saratov Oblast, a settlement in Krasnopartizansky District
- Oktyabrsky, Lysogorsky District, Saratov Oblast, a settlement in Lysogorsky District
- Oktyabrsky, Perelyubsky District, Saratov Oblast, a settlement in Perelyubsky District
- Oktyabrsky, Yershovsky District, Saratov Oblast, a settlement in Yershovsky District

=== Smolensk Oblast ===
As of 2012, four rural localities in Smolensk Oblast bear this name:

- Oktyabrsky, Smolensk Oblast, a village in Yushkovskoye Rural Settlement of Vyazemsky District
- Oktyabrskoye, Khislavichsky District, Smolensk Oblast, a village in Kozhukhovichskoye Rural Settlement of Khislavichsky District
- Oktyabrskoye, Slobodskoye Rural Settlement, Monastyrshchinsky District, Smolensk Oblast, a selo in Slobodskoye Rural Settlement of Monastyrshchinsky District
- Oktyabrskoye, Tatarskoye Rural Settlement, Monastyrshchinsky District, Smolensk Oblast, a village in Tatarskoye Rural Settlement of Monastyrshchinsky District

=== Stavropol Krai ===
As of 2012, one rural locality in Stavropol Krai bears this name:

- Oktyabrskoye, Stavropol Krai, a selo in Oktyabrsky Selsoviet of Ipatovsky District

=== Sverdlovsk Oblast ===
As of 2012, eight rural localities in Sverdlovsk Oblast bear this name:

- Oktyabrsky, Beryozovsky, Sverdlovsk Oblast, a settlement under the administrative jurisdiction of the Town of Beryozovsky
- Oktyabrsky, Beloyarsky District, Sverdlovsk Oblast, a settlement in Kochnevsky Selsoviet of Beloyarsky District
- Oktyabrsky, Kamensky District, Sverdlovsk Oblast, a settlement in Sosnovsky Selsoviet of Kamensky District
- Oktyabrsky, Kamyshlovsky District, Sverdlovsk Oblast, a settlement in Oktyabrsky Selsoviet of Kamyshlovsky District
- Oktyabrsky, Nizhneserginsky District, Sverdlovsk Oblast, a settlement under the administrative jurisdiction of Bisert Work Settlement in Nizhneserginsky District
- Oktyabrsky, Sysertsky District, Sverdlovsk Oblast, a settlement in Oktyabrsky Selsoviet of Sysertsky District
- Oktyabrsky, Talitsky District, Sverdlovsk Oblast, a settlement in Chupinsky Selsoviet of Talitsky District
- Oktyabrskoye, Sverdlovsk Oblast, a selo in Cheremissky Selsoviet of Rezhevsky District

=== Tambov Oblast ===
As of 2012, one rural locality in Tambov Oblast bears this name:

- Oktyabrskoye, Tambov Oblast, a selo in Podlesny Selsoviet of Sosnovsky District

=== Republic of Tatarstan ===
As of 2012, two rural localities in the Republic of Tatarstan bear this name:

- Oktyabrsky, Verkhneuslonsky District, Republic of Tatarstan, a settlement in Verkhneuslonsky District
- Oktyabrsky, Zelenodolsky District, Republic of Tatarstan, a settlement in Zelenodolsky District

=== Tomsk Oblast ===
As of 2012, two rural localities in Tomsk Oblast bear this name:

- Oktyabrsky, Tomsk Oblast, a settlement in Alexandrovsky District
- Oktyabrskoye, Tomsk Oblast, a selo in Tomsky District

=== Tula Oblast ===
As of 2012, eight rural localities in Tula Oblast bear this name:

- Oktyabrsky, Arsenyevsky District, Tula Oblast, a settlement in Belokolodezsky Rural Okrug of Arsenyevsky District
- Oktyabrsky, Kireyevsky District, Tula Oblast, a settlement in Oktyabrsky Rural Okrug of Kireyevsky District
- Oktyabrsky, Leninsky District, Tula Oblast, a settlement in Oktyabrsky Rural Okrug of Leninsky District
- Oktyabrsky, Plavsky District, Tula Oblast, a settlement in Oktyabrsky Rural Okrug of Plavsky District
- Oktyabrsky, Shchyokinsky District, Tula Oblast, a settlement in Lomintsevskaya Rural Administration of Shchyokinsky District
- Oktyabrsky, Venyovsky District, Tula Oblast, a settlement in Belkovsky Rural Okrug of Venyovsky District
- Oktyabrsky, Kozminsky Rural Okrug, Yefremovsky District, Tula Oblast, a settlement in Kozminsky Rural Okrug of Yefremovsky District
- Oktyabrsky, Oktyabrsky Rural Okrug, Yefremovsky District, Tula Oblast, a settlement in Oktyabrsky Rural Okrug of Yefremovsky District

=== Tver Oblast ===
As of 2012, two rural localities in Tver Oblast bear this name:

- Oktyabrsky, Tver Oblast, a settlement in Solnechnoye Rural Settlement of Vyshnevolotsky District
- Oktyabrskoye, Tver Oblast, a village in Voroshilovskoye Rural Settlement of Penovsky District

=== Tyumen Oblast ===
As of 2012, five rural localities in Tyumen Oblast bear this name:

- Oktyabrsky, Aromashevsky District, Tyumen Oblast, a settlement in Aromashevsky Rural Okrug of Aromashevsky District
- Oktyabrsky, Ishimsky District, Tyumen Oblast, a settlement in Karasulsky Rural Okrug of Ishimsky District
- Oktyabrsky, Tobolsky District, Tyumen Oblast, a settlement in Verkhnearemzyansky Rural Okrug of Tobolsky District
- Oktyabrsky, Uporovsky District, Tyumen Oblast, a settlement in Yemurtlinsky Rural Okrug of Uporovsky District
- Oktyabrskaya, Tyumen Oblast, a village in Krasnoorlovsky Rural Okrug of Armizonsky District

=== Udmurt Republic ===
As of 2012, five rural localities in the Udmurt Republic bear this name:

- Oktyabrsky, Glazovsky District, Udmurt Republic, a selo in Oktyabrsky Selsoviet of Glazovsky District
- Oktyabrsky, Sarapulsky District, Udmurt Republic, a selo in Sarapulsky District
- Oktyabrsky, Vavozhsky District, Udmurt Republic, a village in Kakmozhsky Selsoviet of Vavozhsky District
- Oktyabrsky, Zavyalovsky District, Udmurt Republic, a selo in Oktyabrsky Selsoviet of Zavyalovsky District
- Oktyabrskaya, Udmurt Republic, a village in Mikhaylovsky Selsoviet of Kambarsky District

=== Ulyanovsk Oblast ===
As of 2012, three rural localities in Ulyanovsk Oblast bear this name:

- Oktyabrsky, Cherdaklinsky District, Ulyanovsk Oblast, a settlement in Oktyabrsky Rural Okrug of Cherdaklinsky District
- Oktyabrsky, Radishchevsky District, Ulyanovsk Oblast, a settlement in Oktyabrsky Rural Okrug of Radishchevsky District
- Oktyabrskoye, Ulyanovsk Oblast, a selo in Kholstovsky Rural Okrug of Pavlovsky District

=== Vladimir Oblast ===
As of 2012, two rural localities in Vladimir Oblast bear this name:

- Oktyabrsky, Vladimir Oblast, a settlement in Vyaznikovsky District
- Oktyabrskaya, Vladimir Oblast, a village in Vyaznikovsky District

=== Volgograd Oblast ===
As of 2012, three inhabited localities in Volgograd Oblast bear this name:

Urban localities

- Oktyabrsky, Oktyabrsky District, Volgograd Oblast, a work settlement in Oktyabrsky District

Rural localities

- Oktyabrsky, Kalachyovsky District, Volgograd Oblast, a settlement in Sovetsky Selsoviet of Kalachyovsky District
- Oktyabrsky, Olkhovsky District, Volgograd Oblast, a settlement in Oktyabrsky Selsoviet of Olkhovsky District

=== Vologda Oblast ===
As of 2012, three rural localities in Vologda Oblast bear this name:

- Oktyabrsky, Totemsky District, Vologda Oblast, a settlement in Matveyevsky Selsoviet of Totemsky District
- Oktyabrsky, Vashkinsky District, Vologda Oblast, a settlement in Ivanovsky Selsoviet of Vashkinsky District
- Oktyabrsky, Vytegorsky District, Vologda Oblast, a settlement in Saminsky Selsoviet of Vytegorsky District

=== Voronezh Oblast ===
As of 2012, four rural localities in Voronezh Oblast bear this name:

- Oktyabrsky, Ertilsky District, Voronezh Oblast, a settlement in Pervomayskoye Rural Settlement of Ertilsky District
- Oktyabrsky, Paninsky District, Voronezh Oblast, a settlement in Oktyabrskoye Rural Settlement of Paninsky District
- Oktyabrsky, Povorinsky District, Voronezh Oblast, a settlement in Dobrovolskoye Rural Settlement of Povorinsky District
- Oktyabrskoye, Voronezh Oblast, a selo in Oktyabrskoye Rural Settlement of Povorinsky District

=== Yaroslavl Oblast ===
As of 2012, one rural locality in Yaroslavl Oblast bears this name:

- Oktyabrsky, Yaroslavl Oblast, a settlement in Oktyabrsky Rural Okrug of Rybinsky District

=== Zabaykalsky Krai ===
As of 2012, one rural locality in Zabaykalsky Krai bears this name:

- Oktyabrsky, Zabaykalsky Krai, a settlement in Krasnokamensky District

== Abolished localities ==
- Oktyabrsky, Murmansk Oblast, an inhabited locality under the administrative jurisdiction of Kirovsk Town with Jurisdictional Territory in Murmansk Oblast; abolished in April 2013
- Oktyabrsky, Sakha Republic, a selo in Oymyakonsky District of the Sakha Republic; abolished in August 2007
- Oktyabrskaya, Irkutsk Oblast, a village in Ekhirit-Bulagatsky District; abolished in June 2015

== Alternative names ==
- Oktyabrsky, alternative name of Krasnooktyabrsky, a settlement in Maykopsky District of the Republic of Adygea; 44°35′N 40°5′E
- Oktyabrsky, alternative name of Takhtamukay, an aul in Takhtamukaysky District of the Republic of Adygea; 44°55′N 39°0′E
- Oktyabrsky, alternative name of Oktyabrsk, a village in Alegazovsky Selsoviet of Mechetlinsky District in the Republic of Bashkortostan; 55°49′N 58°6′E
- Oktyabrsky, alternative name of Novoye Lidzhe, a selo in Araksky Selsoviet of Tabasaransky District in the Republic of Dagestan; 41°59′N 48°1′E
- Oktyabrsky, alternative name of Khosheut, a settlement in Khosheutovskaya Rural Administration of Oktyabrsky District in the Republic of Kalmykia; 47°14′N 45°25′E
- Oktyabrskoye, alternative name of Oktyabr, a selo under the administrative jurisdiction of Podosinovets Urban-Type Settlement in Podosinovsky District of Kirov Oblast; 60°12′N 47°36′E
- Oktyabrsky, alternative name of Popovka, a settlement in Karasuksky District of Novosibirsk Oblast; 53°44′N 77°40′E
- Oktyabrskoye, alternative name of Novomoshkovskoye, a selo in Moshkovsky District of Novosibirsk Oblast; 55°19′N 83°35′E
