= Baltika, Republic of Bashkortostan =

Baltika Балтика
- Selo
- Location within Bashkortostan Location within Russia
- Coordinates: 54°46′N 56°32′E
- Country: Russia
- Region: Bashkortostan
- District: Iglinsky District
- Time zone: UTC+5:00

Baltika (Russian: Балтика) is a rural locality (a selo) and the administrative centre of Baltiysky Selsoviet, Iglinsky District, Bashkortostan, Russia. The population was 719 as of 2010. There are 13 streets.

== Geography ==
Baltika is located 19 km southeast of Iglino (the district's administrative centre) by road. Leninskoye is the nearest rural locality.
