= Novoufimsk =

Novoufimsk Новоуфимск
- Village
- Location within Bashkortostan Location within Russia
- Coordinates: 54°56′N 57°14′E
- Country: Russia
- Region: Bashkortostan
- District: Iglinsky District
- Time zone: UTC+5:00

Novoufimsk (Russian: Новоуфимск; Bashkir: Яңы Өфө, Yañı Öfö) is a rural locality (a village) in Maysky Selsoviet, Iglinsky District, Bashkortostan, Russia. The population was 22 as of 2010. There is 1 street.

== Geography ==
Novoufimsk is located 77 km northeast of Iglino (the district's administrative centre) by road. Uk is the nearest rural locality.
