= Iskra, Republic of Bashkortostan =

Iskra Искра
- Village
- Location within Bashkortostan Location within Russia
- Coordinates: 54°49′N 56°40′E
- Country: Russia
- Region: Bashkortostan
- District: Iglinsky District
- Time zone: UTC+5:00

Iskra (Russian: Искра) is a rural locality (a village) in Austrumsky Selsoviet, Iglinsky District, Bashkortostan, Russia. The population was 124 as of 2010. There are 5 streets.

== Geography ==
Iskra is located 28 km east of Iglino (the district's administrative centre) by road. Zavety Ilyicha is the nearest rural locality.
