= Tyulko-Tamak =

Tyulko-Tamak Тюлько-Тамак
- Village
- Location within Bashkortostan Location within Russia
- Coordinates: 55°00′N 57°04′E
- Country: Russia
- Region: Bashkortostan
- District: Iglinsky District
- Time zone: UTC+5:00

Tyulko-Tamak (Russian: Тюлько-Тамак; Bashkir: Төлкөтамаҡ, Tölkötamaq) is a rural locality (a village) in Krasnovoskhodsky Selsoviet, Iglinsky District, Bashkortostan, Russia. The population was 101 as of 2010. There are 2 streets.

== Geography ==
Tyulko-Tamak is located 78 km northeast of Iglino (the district's administrative center) by road. Orlovka is the nearest rural locality.
