= Amitovo =

Amitovo Амитово
- Village
- Location within Bashkortostan Location within Russia
- Coordinates: 54°38′N 56°22′E
- Country: Russia
- Region: Bashkortostan
- District: Iglinsky District
- Time zone: UTC+5:00

Amitovo (Russian: Амитово; Bashkir: Әмит, Ämit) is a rural locality (a village) in Turbaslinsky Selsoviet, Iglinsky District, Bashkortostan, Russia. The population was 37 as of 2010. There is 1 street.

== Geography ==
Amitovo is located 40 km southwest of Iglino (the district's administrative centre) by road. Postupalovo is the nearest rural locality.
