= Ulu-Karamaly =

Ulu-Karamaly Улу-Карамалы
- Village
- Location within Bashkortostan Location within Russia
- Coordinates: 54°48′N 57°00′E
- Country: Russia
- Region: Bashkortostan
- District: Iglinsky District
- Time zone: UTC+5:00

Ulu-Karamaly (Russian: Улу-Карамалы; Bashkir: Оло Ҡарамалы, Olo Qaramalı) is a rural locality (a village) in Lemezinsky Selsoviet, Iglinsky District, Bashkortostan, Russia. The population was 175 as of 2010. There are 3 streets.

== Geography ==
Ulu-Karamaly is located 57 km east of Iglino (the district's administrative centre) by road. Tashly-Yelga is the nearest rural locality.
