= Krasny Klyuch, Iglinsky District, Republic of Bashkortostan =

Krasny Klyuch Красный Ключ
- Village
- Location within Bashkortostan Location within Russia
- Coordinates: 54°50′N 56°22′E
- Country: Russia
- Region: Bashkortostan
- District: Iglinsky District
- Time zone: UTC+5:00

Krasny Klyuch (Russian: Красный Ключ) is a rural locality (a village) in Iglinsky Selsoviet, Iglinsky District, Bashkortostan, Russia. The population was 54 as of 2010. There are 3 streets.

== Geography ==
Krasny Klyuch is located 6 km northwest of Iglino (the district's administrative centre) by road. Iglino is the nearest rural locality.
