= Shaksha =

Shaksha Шакша
- Village
- Location within Bashkortostan Location within Russia
- Coordinates: 54°44′N 56°16′E
- Country: Russia
- Region: Bashkortostan
- District: Iglinsky District
- Time zone: UTC+5:00

Shaksha (Russian: Шакша; Bashkir: Шаҡша, Şaqşa) is a rural locality (a village) in Kaltymanovsky Selsoviet, Iglinsky District, Bashkortostan, Russia. The population was 290 as of 2010. There are 10 streets.

== Geography ==
Shaksha is located 20 km southwest of Iglino (the district's administrative centre) by road. Svetlaya is the nearest rural locality.
