= Kazayak-Khusnullino =

Kazayak-Khusnullino Казаяк-Хуснуллино
- Village
- Location within Bashkortostan Location within Russia
- Coordinates: 54°56′N 57°07′E
- Country: Russia
- Region: Bashkortostan
- District: Iglinsky District
- Time zone: UTC+5:00

Kazayak-Khusnullino (Russian: Казаяк-Хуснуллино; Bashkir: Ҡаҙаяҡ-Хөснулла, Qaźayaq-Xösnulla) is a rural locality (a village) in Krasnovoskhodsky Selsoviet, Iglinsky District, Bashkortostan, Russia. The population was 53 as of 2010. There are 2 streets.

== Geography ==
Kazayak-Khusnullino is located 70 km east of Iglino (the district's administrative centre) by road. Kazayak is the nearest rural locality.
