= Sart-Lobovo =

Sart-Lobovo Сарт-Лобово
- Selo
- Location within Bashkortostan Location within Russia
- Coordinates: 54°53′N 56°29′E
- Country: Russia
- Region: Bashkortostan
- District: Iglinsky District
- Time zone: UTC+5:00

Sart-Lobovo (Russian: Сарт-Лобово; Bashkir: Һарт-Лабау, Hart-Labaw) is a rural locality (a selo) in Ukteyevsky Selsoviet, Iglinsky District, Bashkortostan, Russia. The population was 423 as of 2010. There are eight streets.

== Geography ==
Sart-Lobovo is located on the left bank of the Lobovka River, 11 km northeast of Iglino (the district's administrative centre) by road. Minzitarovo is the nearest rural locality.
