= Subakayevo =

Subakayevo Субакаево
- Village
- Location within Bashkortostan Location within Russia
- Coordinates: 54°47′N 56°28′E
- Country: Russia
- Region: Bashkortostan
- District: Iglinsky District
- Time zone: UTC+5:00

Subakayevo (Russian: Субакаево; Bashkir: Сыбаҡай, Sıbaqay) is a rural locality (a village) in Baltiysky Selsoviet, Iglinsky District, Bashkortostan, Russia. The population was 250 as of 2010. There are 7 streets.

== Geography ==
Subakayevo is located 7 km southeast of Iglino (the district's administrative centre) by road. Iglino is the nearest rural locality.
