= Yeleninsky =

Yeleninsky Еленинский
- Village
- Location within Bashkortostan Location within Russia
- Coordinates: 54°52′N 56°22′E
- Country: Russia
- Region: Bashkortostan
- District: Iglinsky District
- Time zone: UTC+5:00

Yeleninsky (Russian: Еленинский) is a rural locality (a village) in Iglinsky Selsoviet, Iglinsky District, Bashkortostan, Russia. The population was 13 as of 2010. There is 1 street.

== Geography ==
Yeleninsky is located 5 km north of Iglino (the district's administrative centre) by road. Starye Karashidy is the nearest rural locality.
