= Akberdino =

Akberdino Акбердино
- Selo
- Location within Bashkortostan Location within Russia
- Coordinates: 54°35′N 56°11′E
- Country: Russia
- Region: Bashkortostan
- District: Iglinsky District
- Time zone: UTC+5:00

Akberdino (Russian: Акбердино; Bashkir: Аҡбирҙе, Aqbirźe) is a rural locality (a selo) and the administrative centre of Akberdinsky Selsoviet, Iglinsky District, Bashkortostan, Russia. The population was 1,009 as of 2010. There are 67 streets.

== Geography ==
Akberdino is located 45 km southwest of Iglino (the district's administrative centre) by road. Blokhino is the nearest rural locality.
