= Chyorny Klyuch, Iglinsky District, Republic of Bashkortostan =

Chyorny Klyuch Чёрный Ключ
- Village
- Location within Bashkortostan Location within Russia
- Coordinates: 55°02′N 57°09′E
- Country: Russia
- Region: Bashkortostan
- District: Iglinsky District
- Time zone: UTC+5:00

Chyorny Klyuch (Russian: Чёрный Ключ) is a rural locality (a village) in Krasnovoskhodsky Selsoviet, Iglinsky District, Bashkortostan, Russia. The population was 14 as of 2010. There is 1 street.

== Geography ==
Chyorny Klyuch is located 91 km northeast of Iglino (the district's administrative centre) by road. Krasny Yar is the nearest rural locality.
