= Novaya Beryozovka =

Novaya Beryozovka Новая Берёзовка
- Village
- Location within Bashkortostan Location within Russia
- Coordinates: 54°44′N 56°23′E
- Country: Russia
- Region: Bashkortostan
- District: Iglinsky District
- Time zone: UTC+5:00

Novaya Beryozovka (Russian: Новая Берёзовка) is a rural locality (a village) in Kaltymanovsky Selsoviet, Iglinsky District, Bashkortostan, Russia. The population was 94 as of 2010. There is 1 street.

== Geography ==
Novaya Beryozovka is located 13 km south of Iglino (the district's administrative centre) by road. Taush is the nearest rural locality.
