= Petrovo-Fedorovka =

Petrovo-Fedorovka Петрово-Федоровка
- Village
- Location within Bashkortostan Location within Russia
- Coordinates: 54°47′N 56°24′E
- Country: Russia
- Region: Bashkortostan
- District: Iglinsky District
- Time zone: UTC+5:00

Petrovo-Fedorovka (Russian: Петрово-Федоровка) is a rural locality (a village) in Iglinsky Selsoviet, Iglinsky District, Bashkortostan, Russia. The population was 17 as of 2010. There is 1 street.

== Geography ==
Petrovo-Fedorovka is located 7 km south of Iglino (the district's administrative centre) by road. Iglino is the nearest rural locality.
