= Leninsky, Iglinsky District, Republic of Bashkortostan =

Leninsky Ленинский
- Village
- Location within Bashkortostan Location within Russia
- Coordinates: 54°45′N 56°42′E
- Country: Russia
- Region: Bashkortostan
- District: Iglinsky District
- Time zone: UTC+5:00

Leninsky (Russian: Ленинский) is a rural locality (a village) in Austrumsky Selsoviet, Iglinsky District, Bashkortostan, Russia. The population was 3 as of 2010. There are 2 streets.

== Geography ==
Leninsky is located 43 km southeast of Iglino (the district's administrative centre) by road. Voznesenka is the nearest rural locality.
