= Urozhay, Iglinsky District, Republic of Bashkortostan =

Urozhay Урожай
- Village
- Location within Bashkortostan Location within Russia
- Coordinates: 54°57′N 56°43′E
- Country: Russia
- Region: Bashkortostan
- District: Iglinsky District
- Time zone: UTC+5:00

Urozhay (Russian: Урожай) is a rural locality (a village) in Tavtimanovsky Selsoviet, Iglinsky District, Bashkortostan, Russia. The population was 40 as of 2010.

== Geography ==
Urozhay is located 28 km northeast of Iglino (the district's administrative centre) by road. Spasskoye is the nearest rural locality.
