= Rasmikeyevo =

Rasmikeyevo Расмикеево
- Village
- Location within Bashkortostan Location within Russia
- Coordinates: 54°53′N 57°03′E
- Country: Russia
- Region: Bashkortostan
- District: Iglinsky District
- Time zone: UTC+5:00

Rasmikeyevo (Russian: Расмикеево; Bashkir: Рәсмәкәй, Räsmäkäy) is a rural locality (a village) in Maysky Selsoviet, Iglinsky District, Bashkortostan, Russia. The population was 118 as of 2010. There are 2 streets.

== Geography ==
Rasmikeyevo is located 56 km northeast of Iglino (the district's administrative centre) by road. Kazayak-Kutush is the nearest rural locality.
