= Taush, Iglinsky District, Republic of Bashkortostan =

Taush Тауш
- Village
- Location within Bashkortostan Location within Russia
- Coordinates: 54°45′N 56°24′E
- Country: Russia
- Region: Bashkortostan
- District: Iglinsky District
- Time zone: UTC+5:00

Taush (Russian: Тауш; Bashkir: Тыуыш, Tıwış) is a rural locality (a village) in Kaltymanovsky Selsoviet, Iglinsky District, Bashkortostan, Russia. The population was 23 as of 2010. There are 2 streets.

== Geography ==
Taush is located 12 km south of Iglino (the district's administrative centre) by road. Novaya Beryozovka is the nearest rural locality.
