= Novokubovo =

Novokubovo Новокубово
- Selo
- Location within Bashkortostan Location within Russia
- Coordinates: 54°50′N 56°33′E
- Country: Russia
- Region: Bashkortostan
- District: Iglinsky District
- Time zone: UTC+5:00

Novokubovo (Russian: Новокубово; Bashkir: Яңы Ҡобау, Yañı Qobaw) is a rural locality (a selo) in Chuvash-Kubovsky Selsoviet, Iglinsky District, Bashkortostan, Russia. The population was 283 as of 2010. There are 5 streets.

== Geography ==
Novokubovo is located 12 km east of Iglino (the district's administrative centre) by road. Starokubovo is the nearest rural locality.
