= Stary Yurmash =

Stary Yurmash Старый Юрмаш
- Selo
- Location within Bashkortostan Location within Russia
- Coordinates: 54°40′N 56°16′E
- Country: Russia
- Region: Bashkortostan
- District: Iglinsky District
- Time zone: UTC+5:00

Stary Yurmash (Russian: Старый Юрмаш; Bashkir: Иҫке Юрмаш, İśke Yurmaş) is a rural locality (a selo) in Turbaslinsky Selsoviet, Iglinsky District, Bashkortostan, Russia. The population was 127 as of 2010. There is 1 street.

== Geography ==
Stary Yurmash is located 31 km southwest of Iglino (the district's administrative centre) by road. Turbasly is the nearest rural locality.
