= Kalininsky, Iglinsky District, Republic of Bashkortostan =

Kalininsky Калининский
- Village
- Location within Bashkortostan Location within Russia
- Coordinates: 54°48′N 56°43′E
- Country: Russia
- Region: Bashkortostan
- District: Iglinsky District
- Time zone: UTC+5:00

Kalininsky (Russian: Калининский) is a rural locality (a village) in Austrumsky Selsoviet, Iglinsky District, Bashkortostan, Russia. The population was 37 as of 2010. There are 2 streets.

== Geography ==
Kalininsky is located 31 km east of Iglino (the district's administrative centre) by road. Austrum is the nearest rural locality.
