= Managora =

Managora Манагора
- Selo
- Location within Bashkortostan Location within Russia
- Coordinates: 54°41′N 56°59′E
- Country: Russia
- Region: Bashkortostan
- District: Iglinsky District
- Time zone: UTC+5:00

Managora (Russian: Манагора; Bashkir: Манатау, Manataw) is a rural locality (a selo) in Lemezinsky Selsoviet, Iglinsky District, Bashkortostan, Russia. The population was 46 as of 2010. There are two streets.

== Geography ==
Managora is located 63 km southeast of Iglino (the district's administrative centre) by road. Nizhniye Lemezy is the nearest rural locality.
