= Beloretsk, Iglinsky District, Republic of Bashkortostan =

Beloretsk Белорецк
- Village
- Location within Bashkortostan Location within Russia
- Coordinates: 54°33′N 56°19′E
- Country: Russia
- Region: Bashkortostan
- District: Iglinsky District
- Time zone: UTC+5:00

Beloretsk (Russian: Белорецк; Bashkir: Белорет, Beloret) is a rural locality (a village) in Akberdinsky Selsoviet, Iglinsky District, Bashkortostan, Russia. The population was 46 as of 2010. There is 1 street.

== Geography ==
Beloretsk is located 56 km southwest of Iglino (the district's administrative centre) by road. Urunda is the nearest rural locality.
