= Shelany =

Shelany Шеланы
- Village
- Location within Bashkortostan Location within Russia
- Coordinates: 54°38′N 56°26′E
- Country: Russia
- Region: Bashkortostan
- District: Iglinsky District
- Time zone: UTC+5:00

Shelany (Russian: Шеланы; Bashkir: Шыланны, Şılannı) is a rural locality (a village) in Ivano-Kazansky Selsoviet, Iglinsky District, Bashkortostan, Russia. The population was 10 as of 2010. There is 1 street.

== Geography ==
Shelany is located 27 km south of Iglino (the district's administrative centre) by road. Postupalovo is the nearest rural locality.
