= Starokubovo =

Starokubovo Старокубово
- Selo
- Location within Bashkortostan Location within Russia
- Coordinates: 54°50′N 56°30′E
- Country: Russia
- Region: Bashkortostan
- District: Iglinsky District
- Time zone: UTC+5:00

Starokubovo (Russian: Старокубово; Bashkir: Иҫке Ҡобау, İśke Qobaw) is a rural locality (a selo) in Chuvash-Kubovsky Selsoviet, Iglinsky District, Bashkortostan, Russia. The population was 639 as of 2010. There are 19 streets.

== Geography ==
Starokubovo is located 9 km east of Iglino (the district's administrative centre) by road. Iglino is the nearest rural locality.
