= Yasnaya Polyana, Iglinsky District, Republic of Bashkortostan =

Village in Russia

Yasnaya Polyana Ясная Поляна
- Village
- Location within Bashkortostan Location within Russia
- Coordinates: 54°45′N 56°25′E
- Country: Russia
- Region: Bashkortostan
- District: Iglinsky District
- Time zone: UTC+5:00

Yasnaya Polyana (Russian: Ясная Поляна) is a rural locality (a village) in Kaltymanovsky Selsoviet, Iglinsky District, Bashkortostan, Russia. The population was 65 as of 2010. There are 3 streets.

== Geography ==
Yasnaya Polyana is located 10 km south of Iglino (the district's administrative centre) by road. Taush is the nearest rural locality.
