= Monchazy =

Monchazy Мончазы
- Village
- Location within Bashkortostan Location within Russia
- Coordinates: 54°30′N 56°25′E
- Country: Russia
- Region: Bashkortostan
- District: Iglinsky District
- Time zone: UTC+5:00

Monchazy (Russian: Мончазы; Bashkir: Мансаҙы, Mansaźı) is a rural locality (a village) in Okhlebininsky Selsoviet, Iglinsky District, Bashkortostan, Russia. The population was 168 as of 2010. There are 3 streets.

== Geography ==
Monchazy is located 41 km south of Iglino (the district's administrative centre) by road. Okhlebinino is the nearest rural locality.
