= Staraya Kudeyevka =

Staraya Kudeyevka Старая Кудеевка
- Village
- Location within Bashkortostan Location within Russia
- Coordinates: 54°52′N 56°47′E
- Country: Russia
- Region: Bashkortostan
- District: Iglinsky District
- Time zone: UTC+5:00

Staraya Kudeyevka (Russian: Старая Кудеевка; Bashkir: Иҫке Көҙөй, İśke Köźöy) is a rural locality (a village) in Nadezhdinsky Selsoviet, Iglinsky District, Bashkortostan, Russia. The population was 34 as of 2010. There is 1 street.

== Geography ==
Staraya Kudeyevka is located 44 km east of Iglino (the district's administrative centre) by road. Kudeyevsky is the nearest rural locality.
