= Bogdanovskoye =

Bogdanovskoye Богдановское
- Village
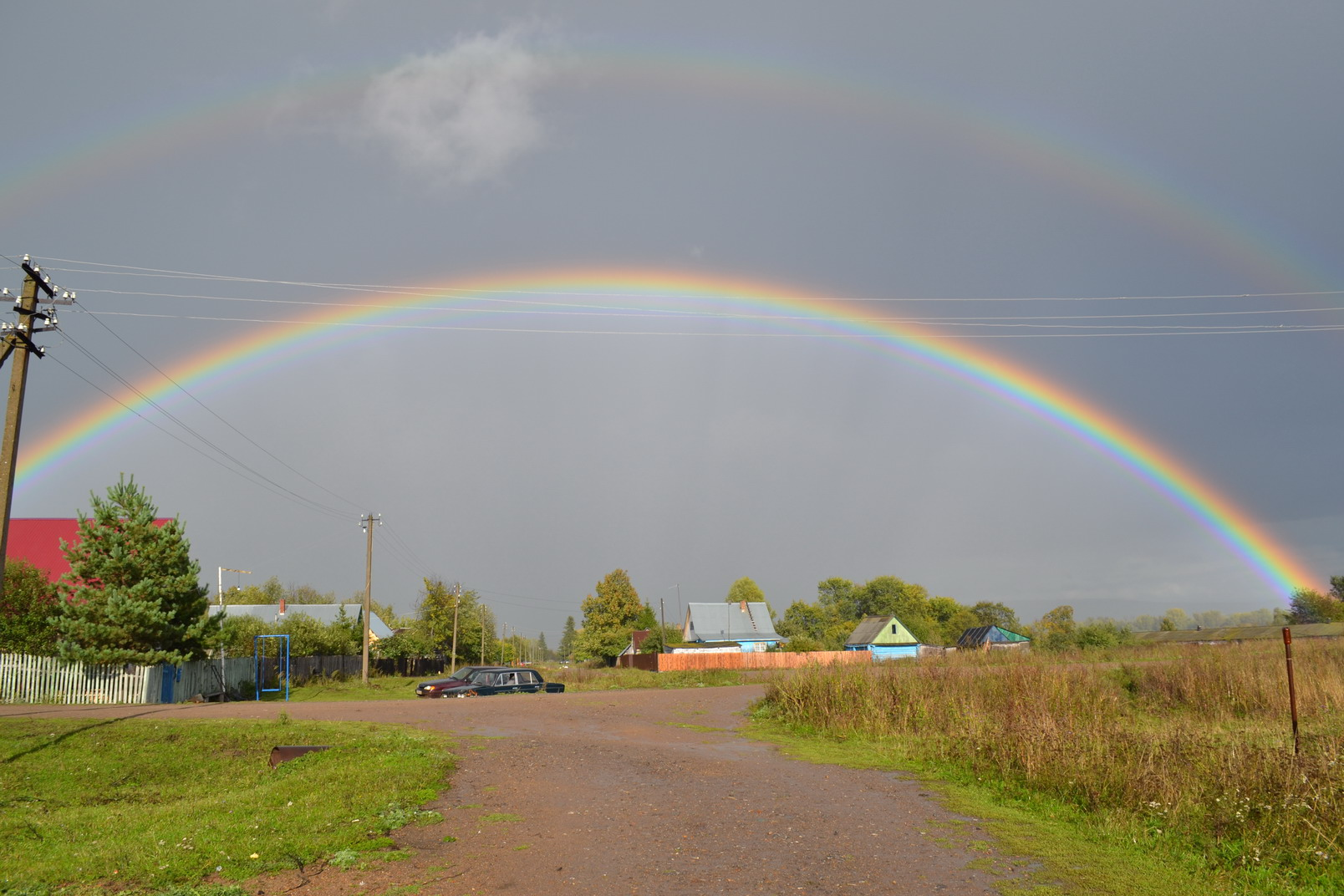
- Photo of Bogdanovskoye taken in 2016

- Location within Bashkortostan Location within Russia
- Coordinates: 54°46′N 56°48′E
- Country: Russia
- Region: Bashkortostan
- District: Iglinsky District
- Time zone: UTC+5:00

Bogdanovskoye (Russian: Богдановское) is a rural locality (a village) in Austrumsky Selsoviet, Iglinsky District, Bashkortostan, Russia. The population was 28 as of 2010. There is 1 street.

== Geography ==
Bogdanovskoye is located 40 km east of Iglino (the district's administrative centre) by road. Simskoye is the nearest rural locality.
