= Shipovo =

Shipovo Шипово
- Village
- Location within Bashkortostan Location within Russia
- Coordinates: 54°33′N 56°16′E
- Country: Russia
- Region: Bashkortostan
- District: Iglinsky District
- Time zone: UTC+5:00

Shipovo (Russian: Шипово) is a rural locality (a village) in Akberdinsky Selsoviet, Iglinsky District, Bashkortostan, Russia. The population was 73 as of 2010. There are 18 streets.

== Geography ==
Shipovo is located 53 km south of Iglino (the district's administrative centre) by road. Karamaly is the nearest rural locality.
