= Peschano-Lobovo =

Peschano-Lobovo Песчано-Лобово
- Village
- Location within Bashkortostan Location within Russia
- Coordinates: 54°54′N 56°35′E
- Country: Russia
- Region: Bashkortostan
- District: Iglinsky District
- Time zone: UTC+5:00

Peschano-Lobovo (Russian: Песчано-Лобово; Bashkir: Песчано-Лабау, Pesçano-Labaw) is a rural locality (a village) in Chuvash-Kubovsky Selsoviet, Iglinsky District, Bashkortostan, Russia. The population was 110 as of 2010. There are 3 streets.

== Geography ==
Peschano-Lobovo is located 15 km northeast of Iglino (the district's administrative centre) by road. Kushkul is the nearest rural locality.
