= Askanysh =

Askanysh Асканыш
- Village
- Location within Bashkortostan Location within Russia
- Coordinates: 54°31′N 56°29′E
- Country: Russia
- Region: Bashkortostan
- District: Iglinsky District
- Time zone: UTC+5:00

Askanysh (Russian: Асканыш; Bashkir: Асҡаныш, Asqanış) is a rural locality (a village) in Ivano-Kazansky Selsoviet, Iglinsky District, Bashkortostan, Russia. The population was 46 as of 2010. There are 7 streets.

== Geography ==
Askanysh is located 42 km south of Iglino (the district's administrative centre) by road. Rodniki is the nearest rural locality.
