= Kazayak-Kutush =

Kazayak-Kutush Казаяк-Кутуш
- Village
- Location within Bashkortostan Location within Russia
- Coordinates: 54°54′N 57°04′E
- Country: Russia
- Region: Bashkortostan
- District: Iglinsky District
- Time zone: UTC+5:00

Kazayak-Kutush (Russian: Казаяк-Кутуш; Bashkir: Ҡаҙаяҡ-Ҡотош, Qaźayaq-Qotoş) is a rural locality (a village) in Ulu-Telyaksky Selsoviet, Iglinsky District, Bashkortostan, Russia. The population was 41 as of 2010. There are 2 streets.

== Geography ==
Kazayak-Kutush is located 64 km east of Iglino (the district's administrative centre) by road. Rasmikeyevo is the nearest rural locality.
