= Olginsky =

Olginsky (Russian: Ольгинский; masculine), Olginskaya (Ольгинская; feminine), or Olginskoye (Ольгинское; neuter) is the name of several rural localities in Russia:

- Olginsky (rural locality), a khutor in Voskresensky Rural Okrug of Abinsky District of Krasnodar Krai
- Olginskoye, Republic of Bashkortostan, a village in Kaltovsky Selsoviet of Iglinsky District of the Republic of Bashkortostan
- Olginskoye, Republic of North Ossetia–Alania, a selo in Olginsky Rural Okrug of Pravoberezhny District of the Republic of North Ossetia–Alania
- Olginskaya, Krasnodar Krai, a stanitsa in Olginsky Rural Okrug of Primorsko-Akhtarsky District of Krasnodar Krai
- Olginskaya, Rostov Oblast, a stanitsa in Olginskoye Rural Settlement of Aksaysky District of Rostov Oblast
