= Austrum =

Austrum Ауструм
- Selo
- Location within Bashkortostan Location within Russia
- Coordinates: 54°48′N 56°45′E
- Country: Russia
- Region: Bashkortostan
- District: Iglinsky District
- Time zone: UTC+5:00

Austrum (Russian: Ауструм) is a rural locality (a selo) and the administrative centre of Austrumsky Selsoviet, Iglinsky District, Bashkortostan, Russia. The population was 535 as of 2010.

== Geography ==
Austrum is located 33 km east of Iglino (the district's administrative centre) by road. Kalininsky is the nearest rural locality.
