= Rezvovo =

Rezvovo Резвово
- Village
- Location within Bashkortostan Location within Russia
- Coordinates: 54°32′N 56°21′E
- Country: Russia
- Region: Bashkortostan
- District: Iglinsky District
- Time zone: UTC+5:00

Rezvovo (Russian: Резвово) is a rural locality (a village) in Akberdinsky Selsoviet, Iglinsky District, Bashkortostan, Russia. The population was 28 as of 2010. There are 4 streets.

== Geography ==
Rezvovo is located 44 km south of Iglino (the district's administrative centre) by road. Urunda is the nearest rural locality.
