= Kurshaki =

Kurshaki Куршаки
- Village
- Location within Bashkortostan Location within Russia
- Coordinates: 54°53′N 56°33′E
- Country: Russia
- Region: Bashkortostan
- District: Iglinsky District
- Time zone: UTC+5:00

Kurshaki (Russian: Куршаки; Bashkir: Көршәк, Körşäk) is a rural locality (a village) in Chuvash-Kubovsky Selsoviet, Iglinsky District, Bashkortostan, Russia. The population was 219 as of 2010. There are 3 streets.

== Geography ==
Kurshaki is located 13 km northeast of Iglino (the district's administrative centre) by road. Chuvash-Kubovo is the nearest rural locality.
