= Kaltovka =

Kaltovka Кальтовка
- Selo
- Location within Bashkortostan Location within Russia
- Coordinates: 54°40′N 56°36′E
- Country: Russia
- Region: Bashkortostan
- District: Iglinsky District
- Time zone: UTC+5:00

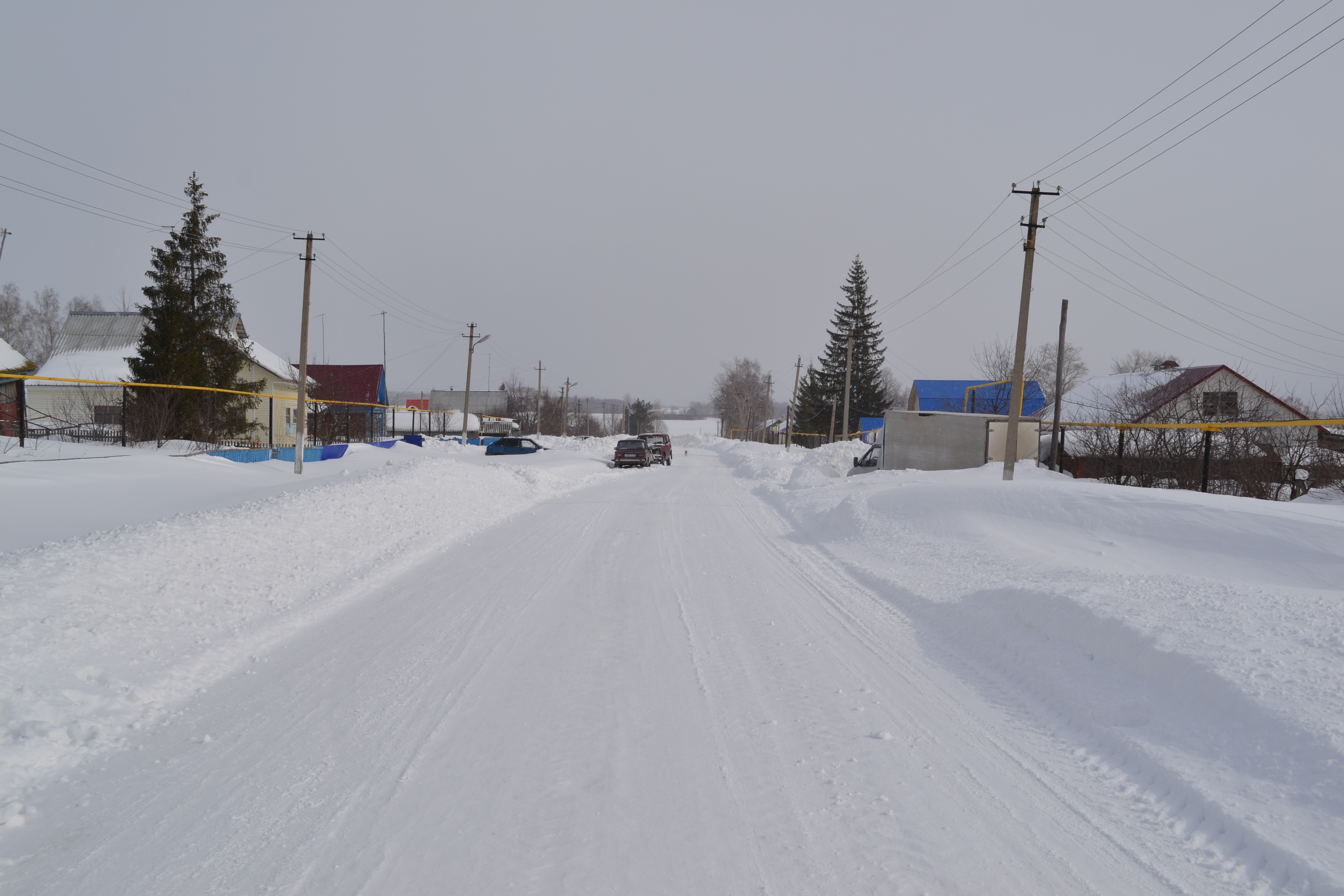
Kaltovka village- Main Street

Kaltovka (Russian: Кальтовка; Bashkir: Кәлтә, Kältä) is a rural locality (a selo) and the administrative centre of Kaltovsky Selsoviet, Iglinsky District, Bashkortostan, Russia. The population was 714 as of 2010. There are 14 streets.

== Geography ==
Kaltovka is located 32 km southeast of Iglino (the district's administrative centre) by road. Voroshilovskoye is the nearest rural locality.
