= Staryye Karashidy =

Staryye Karashidy Старые Карашиды
- Village
- Location within Bashkortostan Location within Russia
- Coordinates: 54°53′N 56°23′E
- Country: Russia
- Region: Bashkortostan
- District: Iglinsky District
- Time zone: UTC+5:00

Staryye Karashidy (Russian: Старые Карашиды; Bashkir: Иҫке Ҡарашиҙе, İśke Qaraşiźe) is a rural locality (a village) in Ukteyevsky Selsoviet, Iglinsky District, Bashkortostan, Russia. The population was 132 as of 2010. There are 4 streets.

== Geography ==
Staryye Karashidy is located 7 km north of Iglino (the district's administrative centre) by road. Klyashevo is the nearest rural locality.
