= Tavtimanovo =

Village in Bashkortostan, Russia

Tavtimanovo Тавтиманово
- Selo
- Location within Bashkortostan Location within Russia
- Coordinates: 54°53′N 56°38′E
- Country: Russia
- Region: Bashkortostan
- District: Iglinsky District
- Time zone: UTC+5:00

Tavtimanovo (Russian: Тавтиманово; Bashkir: Таутөмән, Tawtömän) is a rural locality (a selo) and the administrative centre of Tavtimanovsky Selsoviet, Iglinsky District, Bashkortostan, Russia. The population was 2,219 as of 2010. There are 25 streets.

== Geography ==
Tavtimanovo is located 20 km northeast of Iglino (the district's administrative centre) by road. Klyuchevskoye is the nearest rural locality.
