= Slutka =

Slutka Слутка
- Village
- Location within Bashkortostan Location within Russia
- Coordinates: 54°33′N 56°26′E
- Country: Russia
- Region: Bashkortostan
- District: Iglinsky District
- Time zone: UTC+5:00

Slutka (Russian: Слутка) is a rural locality (a village) in Ivano-Kazansky Selsoviet, Iglinsky District, Bashkortostan, Russia. The population was 45 as of 2010. There are 3 streets.

== Geography ==
Slutka is located 35 km south of Iglino (the district's administrative centre) by road. Monchazy is the nearest rural locality.
