= Kazayak =

Kazayak Казаяк
- Selo
- Location within Bashkortostan Location within Russia
- Coordinates: 54°58′N 57°07′E
- Country: Russia
- Region: Bashkortostan
- District: Iglinsky District
- Time zone: UTC+5:00

Kazayak (Russian: Казаяк; Bashkir: Ҡаҙаяҡ, Qaźayaq) is a rural locality (a selo) in Krasnovoskhodsky Selsoviet, Iglinsky District, Bashkortostan, Russia. The population was 878 as of 2010. There are 14 streets.

== Geography ==
Kazayak is located 72 km northeast of Iglino (the district's administrative centre) by road. Novobakayevo is the nearest rural locality.
