= Tau, Iglinsky District, Republic of Bashkortostan =

Tau Тау
- Village
- Location within Bashkortostan Location within Russia
- Coordinates: 54°42′N 57°04′E
- Country: Russia
- Region: Bashkortostan
- District: Iglinsky District
- Time zone: UTC+5:00

Tau (Russian: Тау; Bashkir: Тау, Taw) is a rural locality (a village) in Lemezinsky Selsoviet, Iglinsky District, Bashkortostan, Russia. The population was 174 as of 2010. There are 2 streets.

== Geography ==
Tau is located 70 km east of Iglino (the district's administrative centre) by road. Ulu-Yelan is the nearest rural locality.
