= Amirovo, Iglinsky District, Republic of Bashkortostan =

Amirovo Амирово
- Village
- Location within Bashkortostan Location within Russia
- Coordinates: 54°53′N 57°08′E
- Country: Russia
- Region: Bashkortostan
- District: Iglinsky District
- Time zone: UTC+5:00

Amirovo (Russian: Амирово; Bashkir: Әмир, Ämir) is a rural locality (a village) in Maysky Selsoviet, Iglinsky District, Bashkortostan, Russia. The population was 26 as of 2010. There is 1 street.

== Geography ==
Amirovo is located 61 km east of Iglino (the district's administrative centre) by road. Maysky is the nearest rural locality.
