= Malaya Ashinka =

Malaya Ashinka Малая Ашинка
- Village
- Location within Bashkortostan Location within Russia
- Coordinates: 54°55′N 57°04′E
- Country: Russia
- Region: Bashkortostan
- District: Iglinsky District
- Time zone: UTC+5:00

Malaya Ashinka (Russian: Малая Ашинка; Bashkir: Кесе Ашинка, Kese Aşinka) is a rural locality (a village) in Krasnovoskhodsky Selsoviet, Iglinsky District, Bashkortostan, Russia. The population was 2 as of 2010. There is 1 street.

== Geography ==
Malaya Ashinka is located 68 km northeast of Iglino (the district's administrative centre) by road.
