= Kaltymanovo =

Kaltymanovo Калтыманово
- Selo
- Location within Bashkortostan Location within Russia
- Coordinates: 54°43′N 56°24′E
- Country: Russia
- Region: Bashkortostan
- District: Iglinsky District
- Time zone: UTC+5:00

Kaltymanovo (Russian: Калтыманово; Bashkir: Ҡалтыман, Qaltıman) is a rural locality (a selo) and the administrative centre of Kaltymanovsky Selsoviet, Iglinsky District, Bashkortostan, Russia. The population was 530 as of 2010. There are 4 streets.

== Geography ==
Kaltymanovo is located 15 km south of Iglino (the district's administrative centre) by road. Novaya Beryozovka is the nearest rural locality.
