= Kudeyevsky =

Kudeyevsky Кудеевский
- Selo
- Location within Bashkortostan Location within Russia
- Coordinates: 54°41′N 56°39′E
- Country: Russia
- Region: Bashkortostan
- District: Iglinsky District
- Time zone: UTC+5:00

Kudeyevsky (Russian: Кудеевский; Bashkir: Көҙөй, Köźöy) is a rural locality (a selo) and the administrative centre of Kudeyevsky Selsoviet, Iglinsky District, Bashkortostan, Russia. The population was 3,091 as of 2010. There are 2 streets.

== Geography ==
Kudeyevsky is located 44 km east of Iglino (the district's administrative centre) by road. Kudeyevka is the nearest rural locality.
