= Balazhi =

Balazhi Балажи
- Village
- Location within Bashkortostan Location within Russia
- Coordinates: 54°36′N 56°29′E
- Country: Russia
- Region: Bashkortostan
- District: Iglinsky District
- Time zone: UTC+5:00

Balazhi (Russian: Балажи; Bashkir: Балажы, Balajı) is a rural locality (a village) in Kaltovsky Selsoviet, Iglinsky District, Bashkortostan, Russia. The population was 215 as of 2010. There are 4 streets.

== Geography ==
Balazhi is located 41 km south of Iglino (the district's administrative centre) by road. Chkalovskoye and Slutka are the nearest rural localities.
