= Minzitarovo =

Minzitarovo Минзитарово
- Selo
- Location within Bashkortostan Location within Russia
- Coordinates: 54°55′N 56°28′E
- Country: Russia
- Region: Bashkortostan
- District: Iglinsky District
- Time zone: UTC+5:00

Minzitarovo (Russian: Минзитарово; Bashkir: Меңйетәр, Meñyetär) is a rural locality (a selo) and the administrative centre of Ukteyevsky Selsoviet, Iglinsky District, Bashkortostan, Russia. The population was 514 as of 2010. There are 14 streets.

== Geography ==
Minzitarovo is located 11 km north of Iglino (the district's administrative centre) by road. Sart-Lobovo is the nearest rural locality.
