= Klyuchevskoye, Republic of Bashkortostan =

Klyuchevskoye Ключевское
- Village
- Location within Bashkortostan Location within Russia
- Coordinates: 54°53′N 56°40′E
- Country: Russia
- Region: Bashkortostan
- District: Iglinsky District
- Time zone: UTC+5:00

Klyuchevskoye (Russian: Ключевское) is a rural locality (a village) in Tavtimanovsky Selsoviet, Iglinsky District, Bashkortostan, Russia. The population was 90 as of 2010. There is 1 street.

== Geography ==
Klyuchevskoye is located 21 km northeast of Iglino (the district's administrative centre) by road. Oktyabrskoye is the nearest rural locality.
