= Chuvash-Kubovo =

Chuvash-Kubovo Чуваш-Кубово
- Selo
- Location within Bashkortostan Location within Russia
- Coordinates: 54°52′N 56°34′E
- Country: Russia
- Region: Bashkortostan
- District: Iglinsky District
- Time zone: UTC+5:00

Chuvash-Kubovo (Russian: Чуваш-Кубово; Bashkir: Сыуаш-Ҡобау, Sıwaş-Qobaw) is a rural locality (a selo) and the administrative centre of Chuvash-Kubovsky Selsoviet, Iglinsky District, Bashkortostan, Russia. The population was 1,602 as of 2010. There are 29 streets.

== Geography ==
Chuvash-Kubovo is located on the left bank of the Lobovka River, 13 km northeast of Iglino (the district's administrative centre) by road. Kurshaki is the nearest rural locality.
