= Yuremis-Nadezhdinskoye =

Yuremis-Nadezhdinskoye Юремис-Надеждинское
- Village
- Location within Bashkortostan Location within Russia
- Coordinates: 54°41′N 56°35′E
- Country: Russia
- Region: Bashkortostan
- District: Iglinsky District
- Time zone: UTC+5:00

Yuremis-Nadezhdinskoye (Russian: Юремис-Надеждинское; Bashkir: Юремис-Надеждин, Yuremis-Nadejdin) is a rural locality (a village) in Kaltovsky Selsoviet, Iglinsky District, Bashkortostan, Russia. The population was 28 as of 2010. There is 1 street.

== Geography ==
Yuremis-Nadezhdinskoye is located 27 km east of Iglino (the district's administrative centre) by road.
