= Okhlebinino =

Okhlebinino Охлебинино
- Selo
- Location within Bashkortostan Location within Russia
- Coordinates: 54°29′N 56°22′E
- Country: Russia
- Region: Bashkortostan
- District: Iglinsky District
- Time zone: UTC+5:00

Okhlebinino (Russian: Охлебинино) is a rural locality (a selo) and the administrative centre of Okhlebininsky Selsoviet, Iglinsky District, Bashkortostan, Russia. The population was 924 as of 2010. There are 19 streets.

== Geography ==
Okhlebinino is located 44 km south of Iglino (the district's administrative centre) by road. Muksinovo is the nearest rural locality.
