= Bulan-Turgan =

Bulan-Turgan Булан-Турган
- Village
- Location within Bashkortostan Location within Russia
- Coordinates: 54°53′N 56°46′E
- Country: Russia
- Region: Bashkortostan
- District: Iglinsky District
- Time zone: UTC+5:00

Bulan-Turgan (Russian: Булан-Турган; Bashkir: Боланторған, Bolantorğan) is a rural locality (a village) in Nadezhdinsky Selsoviet, Iglinsky District, Bashkortostan, Russia. The population was 60 as of 2010. There is 1 street.

== Geography ==
Bulan-Turgan is located 30 km northeast of Iglino (the district's administrative centre) by road. Staraya Kudeyevka is the nearest rural locality.
