= Ulu-Yelan =

Ulu-Yelan Улу-Елан
- Village
- Location within Bashkortostan Location within Russia
- Coordinates: 54°44′N 57°03′E
- Country: Russia
- Region: Bashkortostan
- District: Iglinsky District
- Time zone: UTC+5:00

Ulu-Yelan (Russian: Улу-Елан; Bashkir: Олоялан, Oloyalan) is a rural locality (a village) in Lemezinsky Selsoviet, Iglinsky District, Bashkortostan, Russia. The population was 18 as of 2010. There is 1 street.

== Geography ==
Ulu-Yelan is located 67 km east of Iglino (the district's administrative centre) by road. Nizhniye Lemezy is the nearest rural locality.
