= Urunda =

Urunda Урунда
- Village
- Location within Bashkortostan Location within Russia
- Coordinates: 54°33′N 56°19′E
- Country: Russia
- Region: Bashkortostan
- District: Iglinsky District
- Time zone: UTC+5:00

Urunda (Russian: Урунда; Bashkir: Орондо, Orondo) is a rural locality (a village) in Akberdinsky Selsoviet, Iglinsky District, Bashkortostan, Russia. The population was 192 as of 2010. There are 8 streets.

== Geography ==
Urunda is located 55 km south of Iglino (the district's administrative centre) by road. Beloretsk is the nearest rural locality.
