= Kirovsky, Republic of Bashkortostan =

Kirovsky Кировский
- Village
- Location within Bashkortostan Location within Russia
- Coordinates: 54°55′N 56°59′E
- Country: Russia
- Region: Bashkortostan
- District: Iglinsky District
- Time zone: UTC+5:00

Kirovsky (Russian: Кировский) is a rural locality (a village) in Ulu-Telyaksky Selsoviet, Iglinsky District, Bashkortostan, Russia. The population was 72 as of 2010. There are 5 streets.

== Geography ==
Kirovsky is located 56 km northeast of Iglino (the district's administrative centre) by road. Ulu-Telyak is the nearest rural locality.
