= Sotsialistichesky =

Sotsialistichesky Социалистический
- Village
- Location within Bashkortostan Location within Russia
- Coordinates: 54°49′N 56°47′E
- Country: Russia
- Region: Bashkortostan
- District: Iglinsky District
- Time zone: UTC+5:00

Sotsialistichesky (Russian: Социалистический) is a rural locality (a village) in Nadezhdinsky Selsoviet, Iglinsky District, Bashkortostan, Russia. The population was 46 as of 2010. There are 7 streets.

== Geography ==
Sotsialistichesky is located 36 km (22 mi) east of Iglino (the district's administrative centre) by road. Pyatiletka is the nearest rural locality.
