= Ustyugovka =

Ustyugovka Устюговка
- Village
- Location within Bashkortostan Location within Russia
- Coordinates: 55°04′N 57°04′E
- Country: Russia
- Region: Bashkortostan
- District: Iglinsky District
- Time zone: UTC+5:00

Ustyugovka (Russian: Устюговка) is a rural locality (a village) in Krasnovoskhodsky Selsoviet, Iglinsky District, Bashkortostan, Russia. The population was 38 as of 2010. There are 2 streets.

== Geography ==
Ustyugovka is located 76 km northeast of Iglino (the district's administrative centre) by road. Mikhaylovka is the nearest rural locality.
