= Postupalovo =

Postupalovo Поступалово
- Village
- Location within Bashkortostan Location within Russia
- Coordinates: 54°38′N 56°25′E
- Country: Russia
- Region: Bashkortostan
- District: Iglinsky District
- Time zone: UTC+5:00

Postupalovo (Russian: Поступалово) is a rural locality (a village) in Ivano-Kazansky Selsoviet, Iglinsky District, Bashkortostan, Russia. The population was 70 in 2010 and had 2 streets.

== Geography ==
Postupalovo is 25 km south of Iglino (the district's administrative centre) by road. Shelany is the nearest rural locality.
