= Pervomayskoye, Iglinsky District, Republic of Bashkortostan =

Pervomayskoye Первомайское
- Village
- Location within Bashkortostan Location within Russia
- Coordinates: 54°43′N 56°36′E
- Country: Russia
- Region: Bashkortostan
- District: Iglinsky District
- Time zone: UTC+5:00

Pervomayskoye (Russian: Первомайское) is a rural locality (a village) in Kaltovsky Selsoviet, Iglinsky District, Bashkortostan, Russia. The population was 76 as of 2010. There is 1 street.

== Geography ==
Pervomayskoye is located 26 km southeast of Iglino (the district's administrative centre) by road. Budyonnovsky is the nearest rural locality.
