= Novosimskoye =

Novosimskoye Новосимское
- Village
- Location within Bashkortostan Location within Russia
- Coordinates: 54°39′N 56°40′E
- Country: Russia
- Region: Bashkortostan
- District: Iglinsky District
- Time zone: UTC+5:00

Novosimskoye (Russian: Новосимское; Bashkir: Яңы Эҫем, Yañı Eśem) is a rural locality (a village) in Kaltovsky Selsoviet, Iglinsky District, Bashkortostan, Russia. The population was 7 as of 2010. There is 1 street.

== Geography ==
Novosimskoye is located 151 km southeast of Iglino (the district's administrative centre) by road. Kommunar is the nearest rural locality.
