= Krasny Voskhod, Iglinsky District, Republic of Bashkortostan =

Krasny Voskhod Красный Восход
- Selo
- Location within Bashkortostan Location within Russia
- Coordinates: 54°58′N 57°02′E
- Country: Russia
- Region: Bashkortostan
- District: Iglinsky District
- Time zone: UTC+5:00

Krasny Voskhod (Russian: Красный Восход) is a rural locality (a selo) and the administrative centre of Krasnovoskhodsky Selsoviet, Iglinsky District, Bashkortostan, Russia. The population was 842 as of 2010. There are 13 streets.

== Geography ==
Krasny Voskhod is located 65 km northeast of Iglino (the district's administrative centre) by road. Novobakayevo is the nearest rural locality.
