= Ukteyevo =

Ukteyevo Уктеево
- Selo
- Location within Bashkortostan Location within Russia
- Coordinates: 54°57′N 56°29′E
- Country: Russia
- Region: Bashkortostan
- District: Iglinsky District
- Time zone: UTC+5:00

Ukteyevo (Russian: Уктеево; Bashkir: Үктәй, Üktäy) is a rural locality (a selo) in Ukteyevsky Selsoviet, Iglinsky District, Bashkortostan, Russia. The population was 397 as of 2010. There are 6 streets.

== Geography ==
Ukteyevo is located 16 km north of Iglino (the district's administrative centre) by road. Baygildino is the nearest rural locality.
