= Bibakhtino =

Bibakhtino Бибахтино
- Village
- Location within Bashkortostan Location within Russia
- Coordinates: 54°40′N 56°21′E
- Country: Russia
- Region: Bashkortostan
- District: Iglinsky District
- Time zone: UTC+5:00

Bibakhtino (Russian: Бибахтино; Bashkir: Бейбаҡты, Beybaqtı) is a rural locality (a village) in Turbaslinsky Selsoviet, Iglinsky District, Bashkortostan, Russia. The population was 185 as of 2010. There is 1 street.

== Geography ==
Bibakhtino is located 21 km south of Iglino (the district's administrative centre) by road. Barantsevo is the nearest rural locality.
