= Tashly-Yelga, Iglinsky District, Republic of Bashkortostan =

Tashly-Yelga Ташлы-Елга
- Village
- Location within Bashkortostan Location within Russia
- Coordinates: 54°47′N 57°00′E
- Country: Russia
- Region: Bashkortostan
- District: Iglinsky District
- Time zone: UTC+5:00

Tashly-Yelga (Russian: Ташлы-Елга; Bashkir: Ташлыйылға, Taşlıyılğa) is a rural locality (a village) in Lemezinsky Selsoviet, Iglinsky District, Bashkortostan, Russia. The population was 23 as of 2010. There is 1 street.

== Geography ==
Tashly-Yelga is located 56 km east of Iglino (the district's administrative centre) by road. Ulu-Karamaly is the nearest rural locality.
