= Kushkul, Iglinsky District, Republic of Bashkortostan =

Kushkul Кушкуль
- Village
- Location within Bashkortostan Location within Russia
- Coordinates: 54°54′N 56°36′E
- Country: Russia
- Region: Bashkortostan
- District: Iglinsky District
- Time zone: UTC+5:00

Kushkul (Russian: Кушкуль; Bashkir: Ҡушкүл, Quşkül) is a rural locality (a village) in Tavtimanovsky Selsoviet, Iglinsky District, Bashkortostan, Russia. The population was 33 as of 2010. There is 1 street.

== Geography ==
Kushkul is located 17 km northeast of Iglino (the district's administrative centre) by road. Peschano-Lyubovo is the nearest rural locality.
