= Blokhino =

Blokhino Блохино
- Village
- Location within Bashkortostan Location within Russia
- Coordinates: 54°35′N 56°13′E
- Country: Russia
- Region: Bashkortostan
- District: Iglinsky District
- Time zone: UTC+5:00

Blokhino (Russian: Блохино) is a rural locality (a village) in Akberdinsky Selsoviet, Iglinsky District, Bashkortostan, Russia. The population was 41 as of 2010. There are 10 streets.

== Geography ==
Blokhino is located 47 km southwest of Iglino (the district's administrative centre) by road. Akberdino is the nearest rural locality.
