= Karamaly =

Karamaly Карамалы
- Selo
- Location within Bashkortostan Location within Russia
- Coordinates: 54°35′N 56°16′E
- Country: Russia
- Region: Bashkortostan
- District: Iglinsky District
- Time zone: UTC+5:00

Karamaly (Russian: Карамалы; Bashkir: Ҡарамалы, Qaramalı) is a rural locality (a selo) in Akberdinsky Selsoviet, Iglinsky District, Bashkortostan, Russia. The population was 381 as of 2010. There are 18 streets.

== Geography ==
Karamaly is located 51 km southwest of Iglino (the district's administrative centre) by road. Shipovo is the nearest rural locality.
