= Novobakayevo =

Novobakayevo Новобакаево
- Village
- Location within Bashkortostan Location within Russia
- Coordinates: 54°58′N 57°05′E
- Country: Russia
- Region: Bashkortostan
- District: Iglinsky District
- Time zone: UTC+5:00

Novobakayevo (Russian: Новобакаево; Bashkir: Яңы Баҡай, Yañı Baqay) is a rural locality (a village) in Krasnovoskhodsky Selsoviet, Iglinsky District, Bashkortostan, Russia. The population was 38 as of 2010. There are 2 streets.

== Geography ==
Novobakayevo is located 67 km northeast of Iglino (the district's administrative centre) by road. Krasny Voskhod is the nearest rural locality.
