= Shukteyevo =

Shukteyevo Шуктеево
- Village
- Location within Bashkortostan Location within Russia
- Coordinates: 54°56′N 57°01′E
- Country: Russia
- Region: Bashkortostan
- District: Iglinsky District
- Time zone: UTC+5:00

Shukteyevo (Russian: Шуктеево; Bashkir: Шүктәй, Şüktäy) is a rural locality (a village) in Ulu-Telyaksky Selsoviet, Iglinsky District, Bashkortostan, Russia. The population was 14 as of 2010. There is 1 street.

== Geography ==
Shukteyevo is located 59 km northeast of Iglino (the district's administrative centre) by road. Kirovsky is the nearest rural locality.
