= Fatkullino =

Fatkullino Фаткуллино
- Village
- Location within Bashkortostan Location within Russia
- Coordinates: 54°53′N 56°56′E
- Country: Russia
- Region: Bashkortostan
- District: Iglinsky District
- Time zone: UTC+5:00

Fatkullino (Russian: Фаткуллино; Bashkir: Фәтҡулла, Fätqulla) is a rural locality (a village) in Ulu-Telyaksky Selsoviet, Iglinsky District, Bashkortostan, Russia. The population was 48 as of 2010. There is 1 street.

== Geography ==
Fatkullino is located 50 km east of Iglino (the district's administrative centre) by road. Ulu-Telyak is the nearest rural locality.
