= Alatorka =

Alatorka Алаторка
- Selo
- Location within Bashkortostan Location within Russia
- Coordinates: 54°46′N 56°22′E
- Country: Russia
- Region: Bashkortostan
- District: Iglinsky District
- Time zone: UTC+5:00

Alatorka (Russian: Алаторка; Bashkir: Алатор, Alator) is a rural locality (a selo) in Kaltymanovsky Selsoviet, Iglinsky District, Bashkortostan, Russia. The population was 718 as of 2010. There are 21 streets.

== Geography ==
Alatorka is located 9 km southwest of Iglino (the district's administrative centre) by road. Iglino is the nearest rural locality.
