= Oktyabrskoye, Iglinsky District, Republic of Bashkortostan =

Oktyabrskoye Октябрьское
- Village
- Location within Bashkortostan Location within Russia
- Coordinates: 54°54′N 56°39′E
- Country: Russia
- Region: Bashkortostan
- District: Iglinsky District
- Time zone: UTC+5:00

Oktyabrskoye (Russian: Октябрьское) is a rural locality (a village) in Tavtimanovsky Selsoviet, Iglinsky District, Bashkortostan, Russia. The population was 164 as of 2010. There are 3 streets.

== Geography ==
Oktyabrskoye is located 24 km northeast of Iglino (the district's administrative centre) by road. Klyuchevskoye is the nearest rural locality.
