= Iglino =

Iglino (Russian: Иглино) is the name of several rural localities in Russia:

- Iglino, Republic of Bashkortostan, a selo in Iglinsky Selsoviet of Iglinsky District in the Republic of Bashkortostan; 54°50′N 56°25′E
- Iglino, Vologda Oblast, a village in Bechevinsky Selsoviet of Belozersky District in Vologda Oblast
