= Gagarka =

Gagarka Гагарка
- Settlement
- Location within Altai Republic Location within Russia
- Coordinates: 50°13′N 85°41′E
- Country: Russia
- Region: Altai Republic
- District: Ust-Koksinsky District
- Time zone: UTC+7:00

Gagarka (Russian: Гагарка; Altay: Как-Арка, Kak-Arka) is a rural locality (a settlement) in Verkh-Uymonsskoye Rural Settlement of Ust-Koksinsky District, the Altai Republic, Russia. The population was 223 as of 2016. There are 6 streets. The town was founded in 1866.

== Geography ==
Gagarka is located on the right bank of the Katun River, 15 kilometres (9.3 mi) southeast of Ust-Koksa (the district's administrative centre) by road. Verkh-Uymon is the nearest rural locality.
