= Mamontovsky =

Mamontovsky (masculine), Mamontovskaya (feminine), or Mamontovskoye (neuter) may refer to:

- Mamontovsky District, a district of Altai Krai, Russia
- Mamontovsky (rural locality), a rural locality (a settlement) in Altai Krai, Russia
