= Borikha =

Borikha Бориха
- Settlement
- Location within Altai Krai Location within Russia
- Coordinates: 52°17′N 82°39′E
- Country: Russia
- Region: Altai Krai
- District: Aleysky District
- Time zone: UTC+7:00

Borikha (Russian: Бориха) is a rural locality (a settlement) and the administrative center of Krasnopartizansky Selsoviet, Aleysky District, Altai Krai, Russia. The population was 538 as of 2013. There are 8 streets.

== Geography ==
Borikha is located 30 km southwest of Aleysk (the district's administrative centre) by road. Mamontovsky is the nearest rural locality.
