= Oktyabrsky, Iglinsky District, Republic of Bashkortostan =

Oktyabrsky Октябрьский
- Village
- Location within Bashkortostan Location within Russia
- Coordinates: 54°51′N 56°45′E
- Country: Russia
- Region: Bashkortostan
- District: Iglinsky District
- Time zone: UTC+5:00

Oktyabrsky (Russian: Октябрьский) is a rural locality (a village) in Nadezhdinsky Selsoviet, Iglinsky District, Bashkortostan, Russia. The population was 100 as of 2010. There are 4 streets.

== Geography ==
Oktyabrsky is located 42 km east of Iglino (the district's administrative centre) by road. Kudeyevka is the nearest rural locality.
