= Olginskoye, Republic of Bashkortostan =

Olginskoye Ольгинское
- Village
- Location within Bashkortostan Location within Russia
- Coordinates: 54°45′N 56°39′E
- Country: Russia
- Region: Bashkortostan
- District: Iglinsky District
- Time zone: UTC+5:00

Olginskoye (Russian: Ольгинское) is a rural locality (a village) in Kaltovsky Selsoviet, Iglinsky District, Bashkortostan, Russia. The population was 46 as of 2010. There is 1 street.

== Geography ==
Olginskoye is located 30 km southeast of Iglino (the district's administrative centre) by road. Leninsky is the nearest rural locality.
