= Verkh-Uymon =

Verkh-Uymon Верх-Уймон
- Village
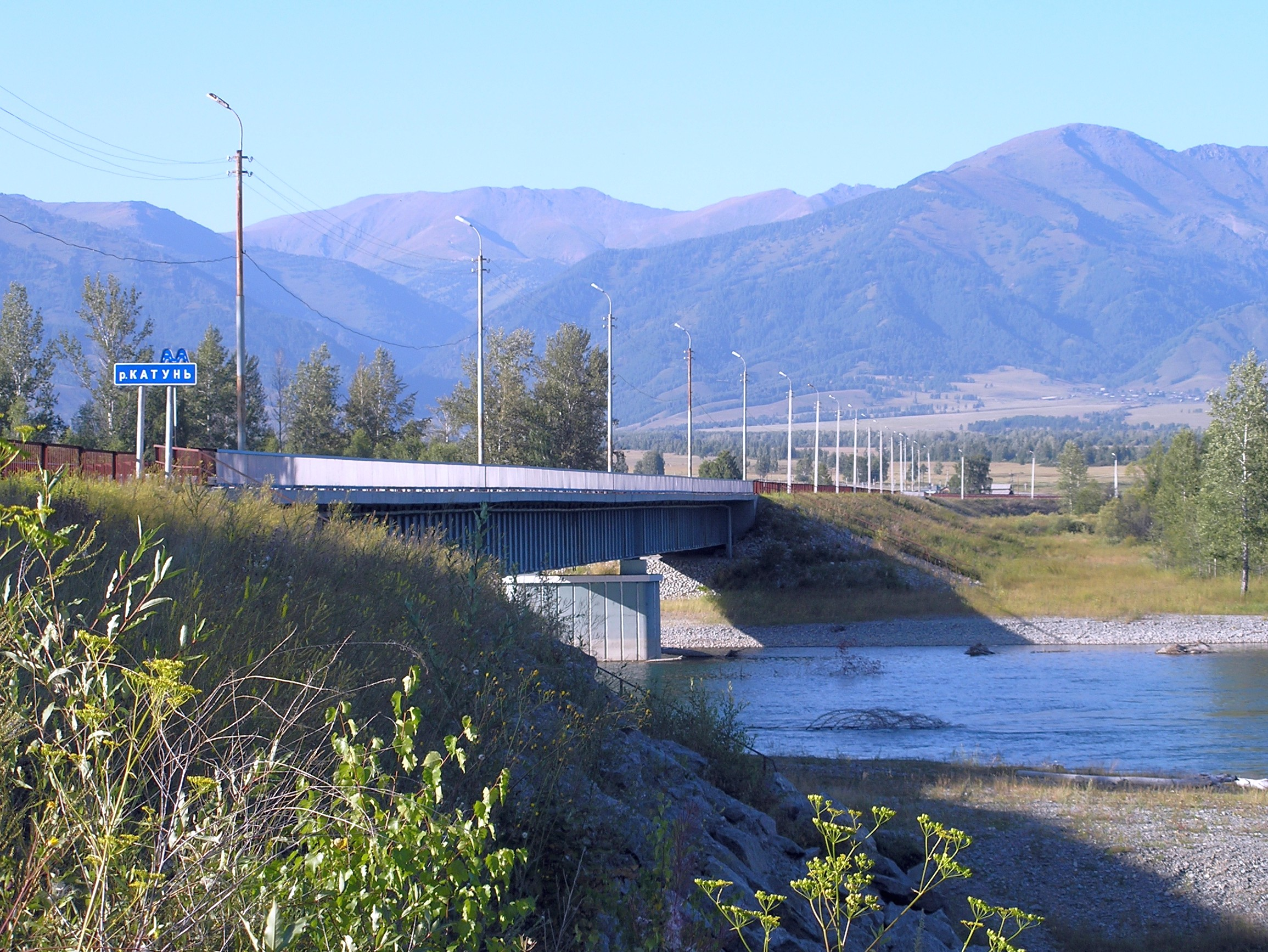
- Interactive map of Verkh-Uymon
- Coordinates: 50°12′N 85°44′E
- Country: Russia
- Region: Altai Republic
- District: Ust-Koksinsky District
- Time zone: UTC+7:00

Verkh-Uymon (Russian: Верх-Уймон; Altay: Ӱстӱги Оймон, Üstügi Oymon) is a rural locality (a selo) in Ust-Koksinsky District, the Altai Republic, Russia. The population was 562 as of 2016. There are 12 streets.

== Geography ==
Verkh-Uymon is located on the right bank of the Katun River, 14 kilometres (8.7 mi) southeast of Ust-Koksa (the district's administrative centre) by road. Oktyabrskoye is the nearest rural locality.
