= Oktyabrsky, Aleysky District, Altai Krai =

Oktyabrsky Октябрьский
- Settlement
- Location within Altai Krai Location within Russia
- Coordinates: 52°20′N 82°45′E
- Country: Russia
- Region: Altai Krai
- District: Aleysky District
- Time zone: UTC+7:00

Oktyabrsky (Russian: Октябрьский) is a rural locality (a settlement) in Aleysky Selsoviet, Aleysky District, Altai Krai, Russia. The population was 120 as of 2013. There are 4 streets.

== Geography ==
Oktyabrsky is located 22 km south of Aleysk (the district's administrative centre) by road. Mamontovsky is the nearest rural locality.
