= Oktyabrsky, Totemsky District, Vologda Oblast =

Oktyabrsky Октябрьский
- Settlement
- Location within Vologda Oblast Location within Russia
- Coordinates: 60°07′N 42°40′E
- Country: Russia
- Region: Vologda Oblast
- District: Totemsky District
- Time zone: UTC+3:00

Oktyabrsky (Russian: Октябрьский) is a rural locality (a settlement) in Pyatovskoye Rural Settlement, Totemsky District, Vologda Oblast, Russia. The population was 255 as of 2002. There are 7 streets.

== Geography ==
Oktyabrsky is located 23 km northwest of Totma (the district's administrative centre) by road. Pustosh is the nearest rural locality.
