= Oktyabrskoye, Sterlitamaksky District, Republic of Bashkortostan =

Oktyabrskoye Октябрьское
- Selo
- Location within Bashkortostan Location within Russia
- Coordinates: 53°35′N 55°37′E
- Country: Russia
- Region: Bashkortostan
- District: Sterlitamaksky District
- Time zone: UTC+5:00

Oktyabrskoye (Russian: Октябрьское) is a rural locality (a selo) and the administrative centre of Oktyabrsky Selsoviet, Sterlitamaksky District, Bashkortostan, Russia. The population was 977 as of 2010. There are 11 streets.

== Geography ==
Oktyabrskoye is located 31 km west of Sterlitamak (the district's administrative centre) by road. Severnaya is the nearest rural locality.
