= Oktyabrskoye, Oktyabrsky District, Orenburg Oblast =

Rural locality in Orenburg Oblast, Russia

Coordinates: 52°20′36″N 55°30′27″E

Oktyabrskoye (Russian: Октябрьское) is a rural locality (a selo) and the administrative center of Oktyabrsky District, Orenburg Oblast, Russia. Population: 7,701 (2010 census); 7,642 (2002 census); 7,281 (1989 Soviet census).
