= Oktyabrsk, Mechetlinsky District, Republic of Bashkortostan =

Oktyabrsk Октябрьск
- Village
- Location within Bashkortostan Location within Russia
- Coordinates: 55°49′N 58°05′E
- Country: Russia
- Region: Bashkortostan
- District: Mechetlinsky District
- Time zone: UTC+5:00

Oktyabrsk (Russian: Октябрьск) is a rural locality (a village) in Alegazovsky Selsoviet, Mechetlinsky District, Bashkortostan, Russia. The population was 394 as of 2010. There are 9 streets.

== Geography ==
Oktyabrsk is located 26 km southwest of Bolsheustyikinskoye (the district's administrative centre) by road. Voznesenka is the nearest rural locality.
