= Oktyabrsky, Republic of Buryatia =

Oktyabrsky Октябрьский
- Settlement
- Location within Republic of Buryatia Location within Russia
- Coordinates: 50°13′N 107°04′E
- Country: Russia
- Region: Republic of Buryatia
- District: Kyakhtinsky District
- Time zone: UTC+8:00

Oktyabrsky (Russian: Октябрьский) is a rural locality (a settlement) in Kyakhtinsky District, Republic of Buryatia, Russia. The population was 345 as of 2010. There are 8 streets.

== Geography ==
Oktyabrsky is located 63 km southeast of Kyakhta (the district's administrative centre) by road. Bolshaya Kudara is the nearest rural locality.
