= Oktyabrsky, Kochyovsky District, Perm Krai =

Oktyabrsky Октябрьский
- Settlement
- Location within Perm Krai Location within Russia
- Coordinates: 59°35′N 54°16′E
- Country: Russia
- Region: Perm Krai
- District: Kochyovsky District
- Time zone: UTC+5:00

Oktyabrsky (Russian: Октябрьский) is a rural locality (a settlement) in Kochyovskoye Rural Settlement, Kochyovsky District, Perm Krai, Russia. The population was 601 as of 2010. There are 15 streets.

== Geography ==
Oktyabrsky is located 3 km west of Kochyovo (the district's administrative centre) by road. Kochyovo is the nearest rural locality.
