= Oktyabrsky, Povorinsky District, Voronezh Oblast =

Oktyabrsky Октябрьский
- Settlement
- Location within Voronezh Oblast Location within Russia
- Coordinates: 51°22′N 42°49′E
- Country: Russia
- Region: Voronezh Oblast
- District: Povorinsky District
- Time zone: UTC+3:00

Oktyabrsky (Russian: Октябрьский) is a rural locality (a settlement) and the administrative center of Dobrovolskoye Rural Settlement, Povorinsky District, Voronezh Oblast, Russia. The population was 698 as of 2010. There are 11 streets.

== Geography ==
Oktyabrsky is located 58 km northeast of Povorino (the district's administrative centre) by road. Mikhaylovka is the nearest rural locality.
