= Oktyabrsky, Paninsky District, Voronezh Oblast =

Oktyabrsky Октябрьский
- Settlement
- Location within Voronezh Oblast Location within Russia
- Coordinates: 51°31′N 40°04′E
- Country: Russia
- Region: Voronezh Oblast
- District: Paninsky District
- Time zone: UTC+3:00

Oktyabrsky (Russian: Октябрьский) is a rural locality (a settlement) and the administrative center of Oktyabrskoye Rural Settlement, Paninsky District, Voronezh Oblast, Russia. The population was 806 as of 2010. There are 11 streets.

== Geography ==
Oktyabrsky is located on the right bank of the Ikorets River, 28 km southwest of Panino (the district's administrative centre) by road. Toydensky is the nearest rural locality.
