= Oktyabrsky, Kamensky District, Altai Krai =

Oktyabrsky Октябрьский
- Settlement
- Location within Altai Krai Location within Russia
- Coordinates: 53°42′N 81°07′E
- Country: Russia
- Region: Altai Krai
- District: Kamensky District
- Time zone: UTC+7:00

Oktyabrsky (Russian: Октябрьский) is a rural locality (a settlement) and the administrative center of Prigorodny Selsoviet, Kamensky District, Altai Krai, Russia. The population was 443 as of 2013. There are 10 streets.

== Geography ==
Oktyabrsky is located 20 km southwest of Kamen-na-Obi (the district's administrative centre) by road. Novodubrovsky is the nearest rural locality.
