= Oktyabrsky, Vashkinsky District, Vologda Oblast =

Oktyabrsky Октябрьский
- Settlement
- Location within Vologda Oblast Location within Russia
- Coordinates: 60°38′N 38°08′E
- Country: Russia
- Region: Vologda Oblast
- District: Vashkinsky District
- Time zone: UTC+3:00

Oktyabrsky (Russian: Октябрьский) is a rural locality (a settlement) in Ivanovskoye Rural Settlement, Vashkinsky District, Vologda Oblast, Russia. The population was 268 as of 2002. There are 5 streets.

== Geography ==
Oktyabrsky is located 57 km northeast of Lipin Bor (the district's administrative centre) by road. Pervomaysky is the nearest rural locality.
