= Oktyabrskoye, Kizlyarsky District, Republic of Dagestan =

Oktyabrskoye Октябрьское
- Selo
- Location within Republic of Dagestan Location within Russia
- Coordinates: 43°55′N 46°45′E
- Country: Russia
- Region: Republic of Dagestan
- District: Kizlyarsky District
- Time zone: UTC+3:00

Oktyabrskoye (Russian: Октябрьское) is a rural locality (a selo) in Kizlyarsky Selsoviet, Kizlyarsky District, Republic of Dagestan, Russia. The population was 348 as of 2010. There are 5 streets.

== Geography ==
Oktyabrskoye is located 10 km northeast of Kizlyar (the district's administrative centre) by road. Proletarskoye and Shkolnoye are the nearest rural localities.

== Nationalities ==
Avars and Russians live there.
