= Oktyabrsky District, Orenburg Oblast =

Oktyabrsky District Октябрьский район (Russian)
- District
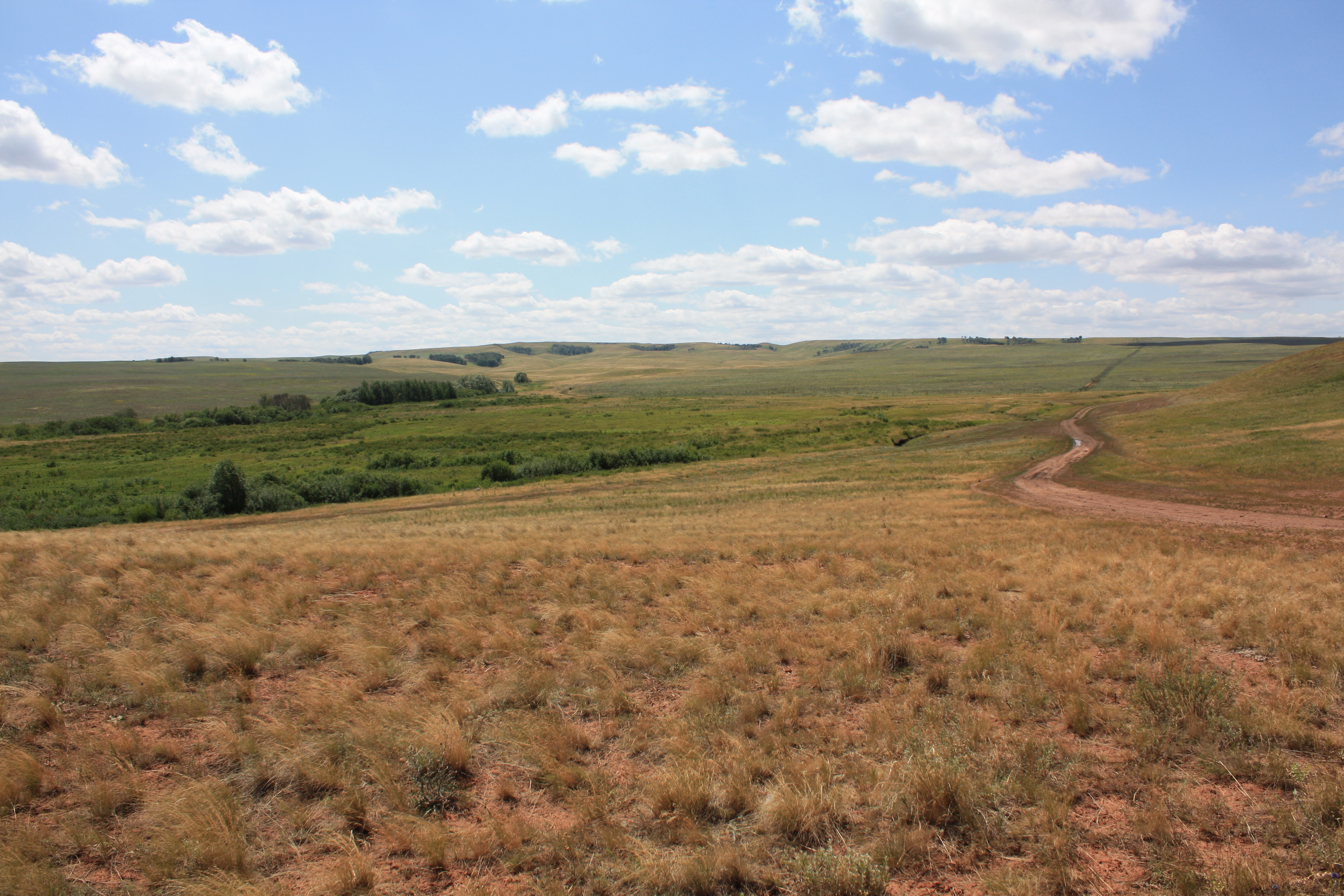
- Landscape around the Usolki River in Oktyabrsky District

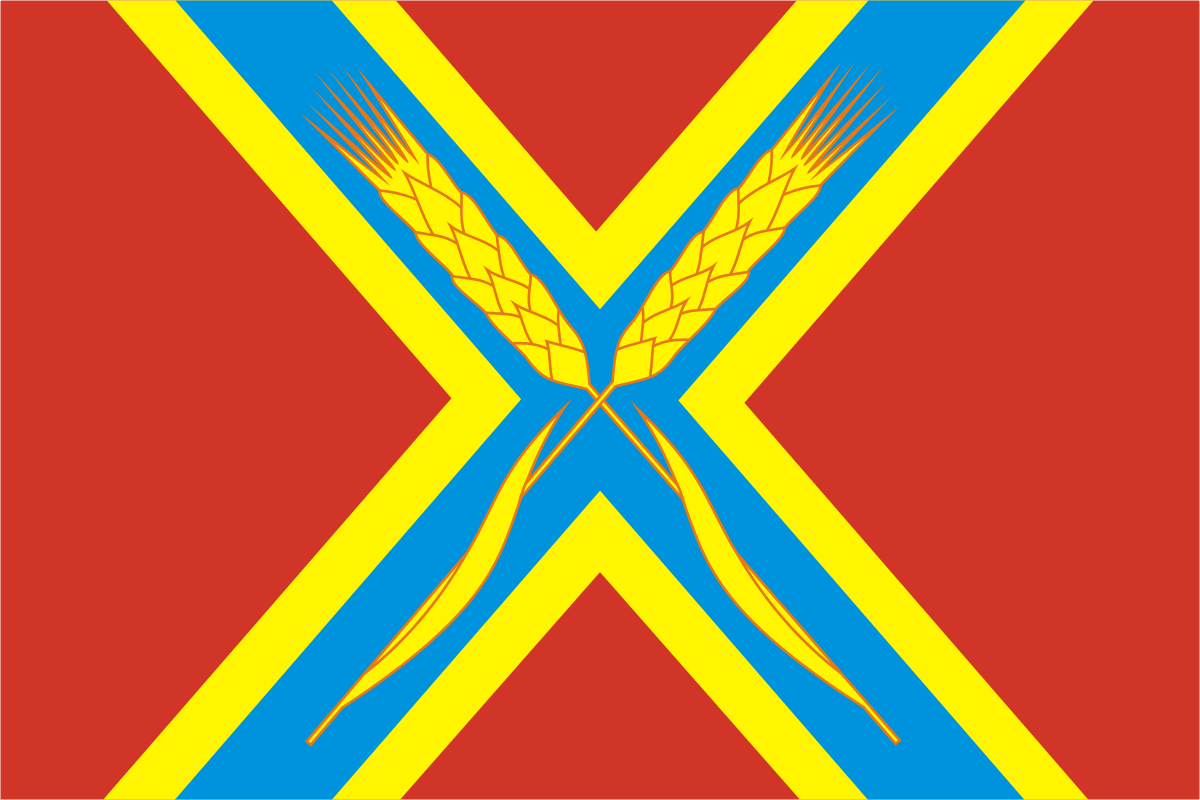
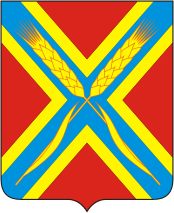
- Flag Coat of arms
- Location of Oktyabrsky District in Orenburg Oblast
- Coordinates: 52°21′N 55°30′E
- Country: Russia
- Federal subject: Orenburg Oblast
- Established: May 30, 1927
- Administrative center: Oktyabrskoye

Area
  - Total: 2,700 km^{2} (1,000 sq mi)

Population (2010 Census)
  - Total: 20,018
  - Density: 7.4/km^{2} (19/sq mi)
  - Urban: 0%
  - Rural: 100%

Administrative structure
  - Administrative divisions: 16 Selsoviets
  - Inhabited localities: 46 rural localities

Municipal structure
  - Municipally incorporated as: Oktyabrsky Municipal District
  - Municipal divisions: 0 urban settlements, 14 rural settlements
- Time zone: UTC+5 (MSK+2)
- OKTMO ID: 53633000
- Website: http://mo-ok.orb.ru

Population of Oktyabrsky District
- 2010 Census: 20,018
- 2002 Census: 22,005
- 1989 Census: 22,180
- 1979 Census: 22,529

Oktyabrsky District (Russian: Октя́брьский райо́н) is an administrative and municipal district (raion), one of the thirty-five in Orenburg Oblast, Russia. It is located in the center of the oblast and borders Kuyurgazinsky District of the Republic of Bashkortostan and Sharlyksky District in the north, Tyulgansky District in the east, Sakmarsky District in the south, and Alexandrovsky and Perevolotsky Districts in the west. The area of the district is 2,700 square kilometers (1,000 sq mi). Its administrative center is the rural locality (a selo) of Oktyabrskoye. As of the 2010 Census, the total population of the district was 20,018, with the population of Oktyabrskoye accounting for 38.5% of that number.

== History ==
Kashirinsky District (Каширинский район) was established on May 30, 1927, when Orenburg Governorate was divided into districts. In 1935, the district was given its present name. On January 12, 1965, Belozersky District was merged into Oktyabrsky District, thus establishing it in its modern borders.
