= Oktyabrsky, Karaidelsky District, Republic of Bashkortostan =

Oktyabrsky Октябрьский
- Village
- Location within Bashkortostan Location within Russia
- Coordinates: 55°40′N 56°50′E
- Country: Russia
- Region: Bashkortostan
- District: Karaidelsky District
- Time zone: UTC+5:00

Oktyabrsky (Russian: Октябрьский) is a rural locality (a village) in Kirzinsky Selsoviet, Karaidelsky District, Bashkortostan, Russia. The population was 1 as of 2010. There are 2 streets.

== Geography ==
Oktyabrsky is located 44 km southwest of Karaidel (the district's administrative centre) by road. Chebykovo is the nearest rural locality.
