= Oktyabrsky, Komsomolsky District, Ivanovo Oblast =

Oktyabrsky Октябрьский
- Village
- Location within Ivanovo Oblast Location within Russia
- Coordinates: 57°08′N 40°20′E
- Country: Russia
- Region: Ivanovo Oblast
- District: Komsomolsky District
- Time zone: UTC+3:00

Oktyabrsky (Russian: Октябрьский) is a rural locality (a selo) in Komsomolsky District, Ivanovo Oblast, Russia. Population: 1,226 (2010 census);

== Geography ==
This rural locality is located 12 kilometres (7.5 mi) from Komsomolsk (the district's administrative centre), 41 kilometres (25 mi) from Ivanovo (capital of Ivanovo Oblast) and 225 kilometres (140 mi) from Moscow. Arkhangel is the nearest rural locality.
