= Oktyabrsky, Kineshemsky District, Ivanovo Oblast =

Oktyabrsky Октябрьский
- Village
- Location within Ivanovo Oblast Location within Russia
- Coordinates: 57°28′N 42°03′E
- Country: Russia
- Region: Ivanovo Oblast
- District: Kineshemsky District
- Time zone: UTC+3:00

Oktyabrsky (Russian: Октябрьский) is a rural locality (a selo) in Kineshemsky District, Ivanovo Oblast, Russia. Population: 1,897 (2010 census);

== Geography ==
This rural locality is located 6 kilometres (3.7 mi) from Kineshma (the district's administrative centre), 85 kilometres (53 mi) from Ivanovo (capital of Ivanovo Oblast) and 327 kilometres (203 mi) from Moscow. Pervomaysky is the nearest rural locality.
