= Novoye Lidzhe =

Novoye Lidzhe Новое Лидже
- Selo
- Location within Republic of Dagestan Location within Russia
- Coordinates: 41°58′N 48°00′E
- Country: Russia
- Region: Republic of Dagestan
- District: Tabasaransky District
- Time zone: UTC+3:00

Novoye Lidzhe (Russian: Новое Лидже) is a rural locality (a selo) in Araksky Selsoviet, Tabasaransky District, Republic of Dagestan, Russia. Population: 554 (2010 census); 522 (2002 census); 471 (1989 Soviet census). There are 7 streets.

== Geography ==
Novoye Lidzhe is located 8 km northeast of Khuchni (the district's administrative centre) by road. Arak is the nearest rural locality.
