= Oktyabrsky, Vytegorsky District, Vologda Oblast =

Oktyabrsky Октябрьский
- Settlement
- Location within Vologda Oblast Location within Russia
- Coordinates: 61°22′N 36°38′E
- Country: Russia
- Region: Vologda Oblast
- District: Vytegorsky District
- Time zone: UTC+3:00

Oktyabrsky (Russian: Октябрьский) is a rural locality (a settlement) and the administrative center of Saminskoye Rural Settlement, Vytegorsky District, Vologda Oblast, Russia. The population was 22 as of 2002. There are 12 streets.

== Geography ==
Oktyabrsky is located 47 km north of Vytegra (the district's administrative centre) by road. Kanshino is the nearest rural locality.
