= Oktyabrsky, Olkhovsky District, Volgograd Oblast =

Oktyabrsky Октябрьский
- Settlement
- Location within Volgograd Oblast Location within Russia
- Coordinates: 49°38′N 44°33′E
- Country: Russia
- Region: Volgograd Oblast
- District: Olkhovsky District
- Time zone: UTC+4:00

Oktyabrsky (Russian: Октябрьский) is a rural locality (a settlement) and the administrative center of Oktyabrskoye Rural Settlement, Olkhovsky District, Volgograd Oblast, Russia. The population was 751 as of 2010. There are 12 streets.

== Geography ==
Oktyabrsky is located in steppe, on the Volga Upland, 28 km south of Olkhovka (the district's administrative centre) by road. Zenzevatka is the nearest rural locality.
