= Oktyabrsky, Zonalny District, Altai Krai =

Oktyabrsky Октябрьский
- Settlement
- Location within Altai Krai Location within Russia
- Coordinates: 52°44′N 85°00′E
- Country: Russia
- Region: Altai Krai
- District: Zonalny District
- Time zone: UTC+7:00

Oktyabrsky (Russian: Октябрьский) is a rural locality (a settlement) and the administrative center of Oktyabrsky Selsoviet of Zonalny District, Altai Krai, Russia. The population was 1,137 as of 2016. There are 13 streets.

== Geography ==
Oktyabrsky is located 9 km northeast of Zonalnoye (the district's administrative centre) by road. Voskhod is the nearest rural locality.

== Ethnicity ==
The village is inhabited by Russians and others.
