= Oktyabrsky, Duvansky District, Republic of Bashkortostan =

Oktyabrsky Октябрьский
- Village
- Location within Bashkortostan Location within Russia
- Coordinates: 55°36′N 57°29′E
- Country: Russia
- Region: Bashkortostan
- District: Duvansky District
- Time zone: UTC+5:00

Oktyabrsky (Russian: Октябрьский) is a rural locality (a village) in Duvansky Selsoviet, Duvansky District, Bashkortostan, Russia. The population was 220 as of 2010. There are 4 streets.

== Geography ==
Oktyabrsky is located 63 km west of Mesyagutovo (the district's administrative centre) by road. Potapovka is the nearest rural locality.
