= Oktyabrskaya, Vladimir Oblast =

Oktyabrskaya Октябрьская
- Village
- Location within Vladimir Oblast Location within Russia
- Coordinates: 56°04′N 42°07′E
- Country: Russia
- Region: Vladimir Oblast
- District: Vyaznikovsky District
- Time zone: UTC+3:00

Oktyabrskaya (Russian: Октябрьская) is a rural locality (a village) in Paustovskoye Rural Settlement, Vyaznikovsky District, Vladimir Oblast, Russia. The population was 842 as of 2010. There are 10 streets.

== Geography ==
Oktyabrskaya is located on the Selezen River, 26 km south of Vyazniki (the district's administrative centre) by road. Klimovskaya is the nearest rural locality.
