= Oktyabrskoye, Amur Oblast =

Oktyabrskoye Октябрьское
- Selo
- Location within Amur Oblast Location within Russia
- Coordinates: 49°41′N 127°52′E
- Country: Russia
- Region: Amur Oblast
- District: Konstantinovsky District
- Time zone: UTC+9:00

Oktyabrskoye (Russian: Октябрьское) is a rural locality (a selo) in Kovrizhsky Selsoviet of Konstantinovsky District, Amur Oblast, Russia. The population was 101 as of 2018. There are 2 streets.

== Geography ==
Oktyabrskoye is located 16 km northwest of Konstantinovka (the district's administrative centre) by road. Kovrizhka is the nearest rural locality.
