= Oktyabrskoye, Khasavyurtovsky District, Republic of Dagestan =

Oktyabrskoye Октябрьское
- Selo
- Location within Republic of Dagestan Location within Russia
- Coordinates: 43°29′N 46°26′E
- Country: Russia
- Region: Republic of Dagestan
- District: Khasavyurtovsky District
- Time zone: UTC+3:00

Oktyabrskoye (Russian: Октябрьское) is a rural locality (a selo) and the administrative centre of Oktyabrsky Selsoviet, Khasavyurtovsky District, Republic of Dagestan, Russia. Population: 2,194 (2021 census); 2,074 (2002 census); 1,477 (1989 Soviet census). There are 34 streets.

== Geography ==
Oktyabrskoye is located 35 km north of Khasavyurt (the district's administrative centre) by road. Dzerzhinskoye is the nearest rural locality.
