= Oktyabrsky, Kalachyovsky District, Volgograd Oblast =

Oktyabrsky Октябрьский
- Settlement
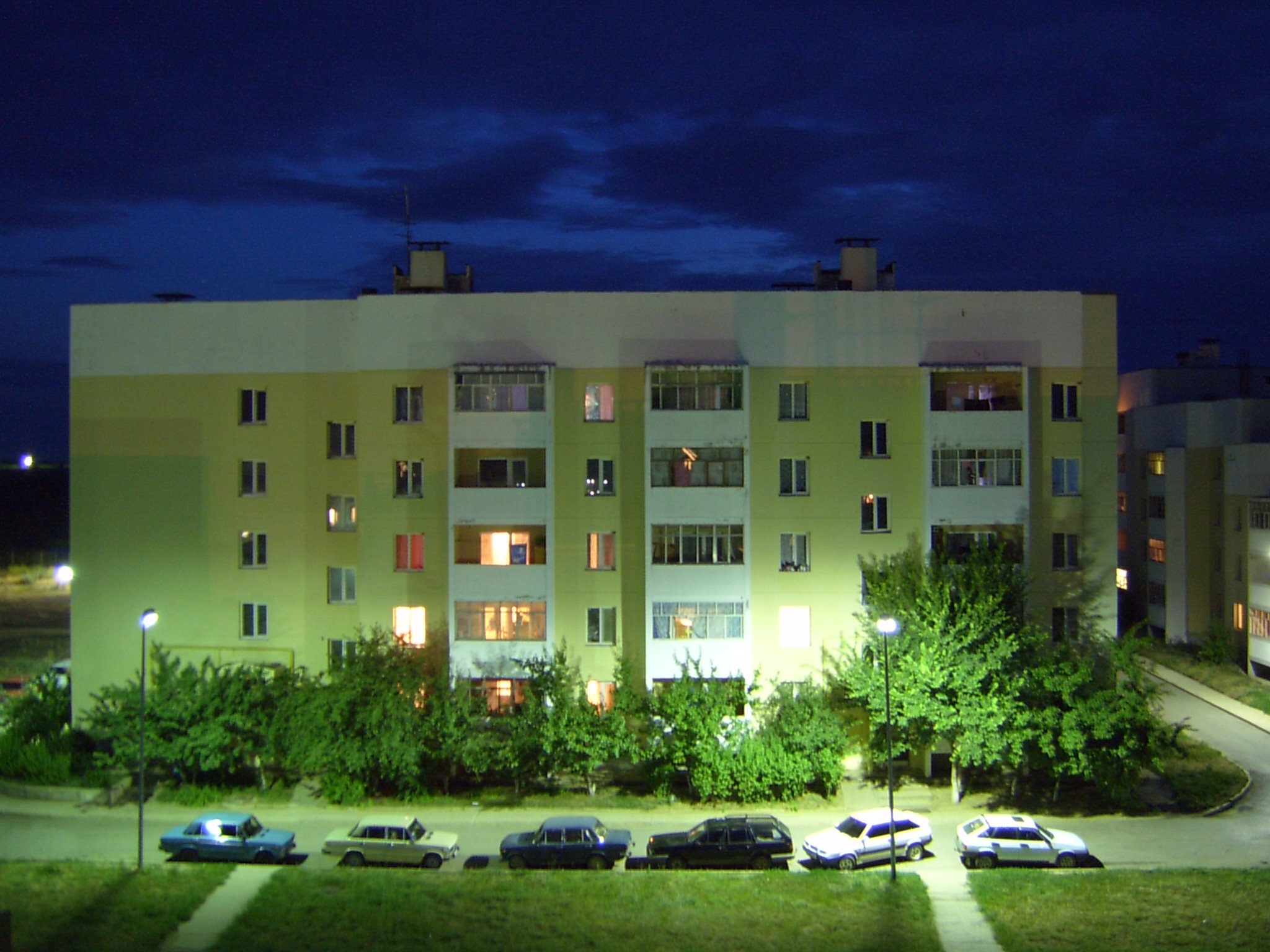

- Location within Volgograd Oblast Location within Russia
- Coordinates: 48°39′N 43°48′E
- Country: Russia
- Region: Volgograd Oblast
- District: Kalachyovsky District
- Time zone: UTC+4:00

Oktyabrsky (Russian: Октябрьский) is a rural locality (a settlement) in Sovetskoye Rural Settlement, Kalachyovsky District, Volgograd Oblast, Russia. The population was 3,489 as of 2010. There are 2 streets.

== Geography ==
Oktyabrsky is located 27 km southeast of Kalach-na-Donu (the district's administrative centre) by road. Komsomolsky is the nearest rural locality.
