= Oktyabrskoye, Novosibirsk Oblast =

Village in Novosibirsk Oblast, Russia

Oktyabrskoye Октябрьское
- Village
- Location within Novosibirsk Oblast Location within Russia
- Coordinates: 53°30′46″N 77°48′22″E
- Country: Russia
- Region: Novosibirsk Oblast
- District: Karasuksky District
- Village Council: Oktyabrsky Village Council
- Time zone: UTC+7:00
- Postcode: 632835

Oktyabrskoye (Russian: Октябрьское) is a rural locality (village) in Karasuksky District, Novosibirsk Oblast, Russia. It is the administrative center of the Oktyabrsky Village Council, and one of the largest settlements in the district.

Population: 1,049 (2010 census); 1,235 (2002 census);

== Geography ==
Oktyabrskoye lies at the southern end of the Baraba Plain, about 10 kilometers (6.2 mi) to the south of lake Astrodym and the lower course of the Karasuk. The Russia-Kazakhstan border lies 15 kilometers (9.3 mi) to the southwest, and Karasuk, the district capital, approximately 40 kilometers (25 mi) to the northeast.
