= Oktyabrskoye, Altai Krai =

Oktyabrskoye Октябрьское
- Selo
- Location within Altai Krai Location within Russia
- Coordinates: 53°34′N 83°50′E
- Country: Russia
- Region: Altai Krai
- District: Pervomaysky District
- Time zone: UTC+7:00

Oktyabrskoye (Russian: Октябрьское) is a rural locality (a selo) in Sibirsky Selsoviet, Pervomaysky District, Altai Krai, Russia. The population was 392 as of 2013. There are 7 streets.

== Geography ==
Oktyabrskoye is located 24 km north of Novoaltaysk (the district's administrative centre) by road. Sibirsky is the nearest rural locality.
