= Oktyabrsky, Zmeinogorsky District, Altai Krai =

Oktyabrsky Октябрьский
- Settlement
- Location within Altai Krai Location within Russia
- Coordinates: 51°16′N 81°42′E
- Country: Russia
- Region: Altai Krai
- District: Zmeinogorsky District
- Time zone: UTC+7:00

Oktyabrsky (Russian: Октябрьский) is a rural locality (a settlement) and the administrative center of Oktyabrsky Selsoviet, Zmeinogorsky District, Altai Krai, Russia. The population was 745 as of 2013. There are 14 streets.

== Geography ==
Oktyabrsky is located 41 km northwest of Zmeinogorsk (the district's administrative centre) by road. Otrada is the nearest rural locality.
