= Oktyabrsky, Ertilsky District, Voronezh Oblast =

Oktyabrsky Октябрьский
- Settlement
- Location within Voronezh Oblast Location within Russia
- Coordinates: 51°40′N 40°39′E
- Country: Russia
- Region: Voronezh Oblast
- District: Ertilsky District
- Time zone: UTC+3:00

Oktyabrsky (Russian: Октябрьский) is a rural locality (a settlement) in Pervomayskoye Rural Settlement, Ertilsky District, Voronezh Oblast, Russia. The population was 90 as of 2010. There are 4 streets.
