= Oktyabrsky, Suyetsky District, Altai Krai =

Oktyabrsky Октябрьский
- Settlement
- Location within Altai Krai Location within Russia
- Coordinates: 53°19′N 79°55′E
- Country: Russia
- Region: Altai Krai
- District: Suyetsky District
- Time zone: UTC+7:00

Oktyabrsky (Russian: Октябрьский) is a rural locality (a settlement) in Verkh-Suyetsky Selsoviet, Suyetsky District, Altai Krai, Russia. The population was 182 as of 2013. There are 4 streets.

== Geography ==
Oktyabrsky is located 13 km northwest of Verkh-Suyetka (the district's administrative centre) by road. Beregovoy is the nearest rural locality.
