= Oktyabrskoye, Altai Republic =

Settlement in Ust-Koksinsky District, Russia

Oktyabrskoye Октябрьское
- Settlement
- Location within Altai Republic Location within Russia
- Coordinates: 50°14′N 85°43′E
- Country: Russia
- Region: Altai Republic
- District: Ust-Koksinsky District
- Time zone: UTC+7:00

Oktyabrskoye (Russian: Октябрьское; Altay: Кеме-Кечӱ, Keme-Keçü) is a rural locality (a settlement) in Ust-Koksinsky District, the Altai Republic, Russia. The population was 252 as of 2016. There are 8 streets.

== Geography ==
Oktyabrskoye is located 10 km southeast of Ust-Koksa (the district's administrative centre) by road. Verkh-Uymon is the nearest rural locality.
