= Mamontovsky (rural locality) =

Rural locality in Aleysky District, Russia

Mamontovsky Мамонтовский
- Settlement
- Location within Altai Krai Location within Russia
- Coordinates: 52°19′N 82°42′E
- Country: Russia
- Region: Altai Krai
- District: Aleysky District
- Time zone: UTC+7:00

Mamontovsky (Russian: Мамонтовский) is a rural locality (a settlement) in Aleysky District of Altai Krai, Russia.
