= Iglino, Bashkortostan =

Iglino Иглино
- Selo

Other transcription(s)
  - Bashkir: Иглин
- Interactive map of Iglino
- Location of Iglino Iglino (Bashkortostan)
- Coordinates: 54°50′18″N 56°25′23″E
- Country: Russia
- Federal subject: Bashkortostan
- Administrative district: Iglinsky District
- SelsovietSelsoviet: Iglinsky
- Founded: 1786
- Elevation: 132 m (433 ft)

Population
  - Estimate (2021): 31,169 )

Administrative status
  - Capital of: Iglinsky District, Iglinsky Selsoviet

Municipal status
  - Municipal district: Iglinsky Municipal District
  - Rural settlement: Iglinsky Selsoviet Rural Settlement
  - Capital of: Iglinsky Municipal District, Iglinsky Selsoviet Rural Settlement
- Time zone: UTC+5 (MSK+2)
- Postal code: 452410
- OKTMO ID: 80628416101

Iglino (Russian: Иглино́, Bashkir: Иглин, İglin) is a rural locality (a selo) and the administrative center of Iglinsky District in Bashkortostan, Russia. Population: 16,811 (2010 census); 13,931 (2002 census); 12,879 (1989 Soviet census).
