= Iglinsky District =

Iglinsky District Иглинский район (Russian)
- District

Other transcription(s)
  - Bashkir: Иглин районы
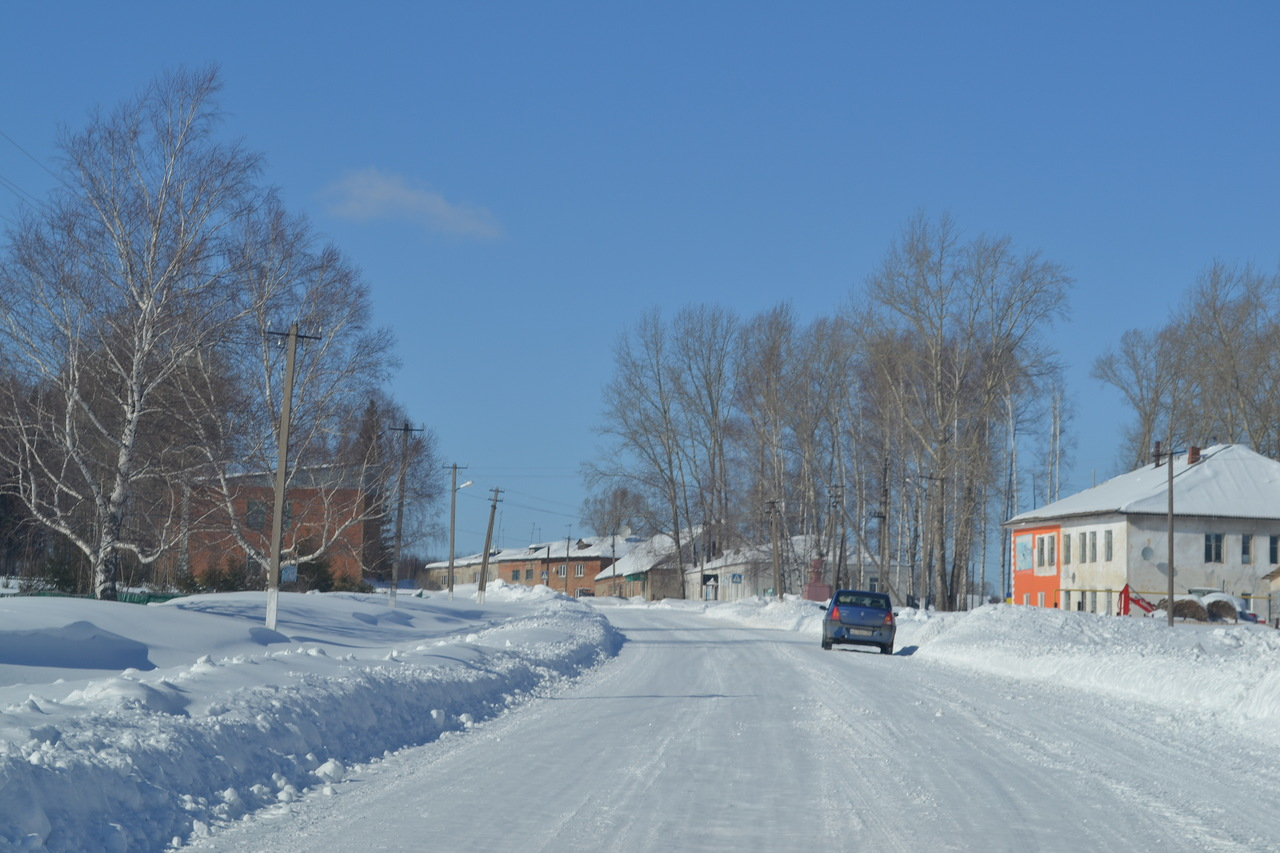
- Kaltova Village, Iglinsky District

- Flag Coat of arms
- Location of Iglinsky District in the Republic of Bashkortostan
- Coordinates: 54°50′N 56°25′E
- Country: Russia
- Federal subject: Republic of Bashkortostan
- Established: January 31, 1935
- Administrative center: Iglino

Area
  - Total: 2,450 km^{2} (950 sq mi)

Population (2010 Census)
  - Total: 49,675
  - Density: 20.3/km^{2} (52.5/sq mi)
  - Urban: 0%
  - Rural: 100%

Administrative structure
  - Administrative divisions: 19 Selsoviets
  - Inhabited localities: 128 rural localities

Municipal structure
  - Municipally incorporated as: Iglinsky Municipal District
  - Municipal divisions: 0 urban settlements, 19 rural settlements
- Time zone: UTC+5 (MSK+2)
- OKTMO ID: 80628000
- Website: https://iglino.bashkortostan.ru/

Iglinsky District (Russian: Игли́нский райо́н; Bashkir: Иглин районы, İglin rayonı) is an administrative and municipal district (raion), one of the fifty-four in the Republic of Bashkortostan, Russia. It is located in the east of the republic and borders with Nurimanovsky District in the north, Chelyabinsk Oblast in the east, Arkhangelsky District in the south, Karmaskalinsky District in the southwest, Ufimsky District in the west, and with Blagoveshchensky District in the northwest. The area of the district is 2,450 square kilometers (950 sq mi). Its administrative center is the rural locality (a selo) of Iglino. As of the 2010 Census, the total population of the district was 49,675, with the population of Iglino accounting for 33.8% of that number.

== History ==
The district was established on January 31, 1935, when it was split from Ufimsky District.

== Administrative and municipal status ==
Within the framework of administrative divisions, Iglinsky District is one of the fifty-four in the Republic of Bashkortostan. The district is divided into 19 selsoviets, comprising 128 rural localities. As a municipal division, the district is incorporated as Iglinsky Municipal District. Its nineteen selsoviets are incorporated as nineteen rural settlements within the municipal district. The selo of Iglino serves as the administrative center of both the administrative and municipal district.

== Demographics ==
Population of Iglinsky District
- 2010 Census: 49,675
- 2002 Census: 45,392
- 1989 Census: 43,576
- 1979 Census: 48,066

In terms of ethnic composition, 38.3% of the population are Russians, 32.0% are Bashkirs, and 12.4% are Tatars.
