= Savkino =

Savkino may refer to:

- Savkino (Bashkortostan)
- Savkino (Novosibirsk Oblast)
- Savkino, Sokolsky District, Vologda Oblast
- Savkino, Gryazovetsky District, Vologda Oblast
- Savkino, Sosnovskoye Rural Settlement, Vologodsky District, Vologda Oblast
