= Kuznetsovka =

Kuznetsovka may refer to:

- Kuznetsovka (Arkhangelsky District), Bashkortostan, Russia
- Kuznetsovka (Bagansky District), Novosibirsk Oblast, Russia
- Kuznetsovka (Iglinsky District), Bashkortostan, Russia
- Kuznetsovka, Vologda Oblast, Russia
