= Kochki =

Kochki (Russian: Кочки) is the name of several rural localities (selos, khutors, and villages) in Russia:

- Kochki, Altai Krai, a selo in Kochkinsky Selsoviet of Rodinsky District of Altai Krai
- Kochki, Belgorod Oblast, a khutor in Gubkinsky District of Belgorod Oblast
- Kochki, Ivanovo Oblast, a village in Kineshemsky District of Ivanovo Oblast
- Kochki, Novosibirsk Oblast, a selo in Kochkovsky District of Novosibirsk Oblast
- Kochki, Omsk Oblast, a village in Protopopovsky Rural Okrug of Lyubinsky District of Omsk Oblast
- Kochki, Tver Oblast, a village in Maksatikhinsky District of Tver Oblast
