= Alexandro-Nevsky (inhabited locality) =

Alexandro-Nevsky (Russian: Александро-Невский; masculine), Alexandro-Nevskaya (Александро-Невская; feminine), or Alexandro-Nevskoye (Александро-Невское; neuter) is the name of several inhabited localities in Russia.

Urban localities

- Alexandro-Nevsky, Ryazan Oblast, a work settlement in Alexandro-Nevsky District of Ryazan Oblast

Rural localities

- Alexandro-Nevsky, Chelyabinsk Oblast, a settlement in Balkansky Selsoviet of Nagaybaksky District of Chelyabinsk Oblast
- Alexandro-Nevsky, Novosibirsk Oblast, a settlement in Bagansky District of Novosibirsk Oblast
- Alexandro-Nevskoye, Republic of Dagestan, a selo in Tarumovsky District of the Republic of Dagestan
- Alexandro-Nevskoye, Novosibirsk Oblast, a selo in Ubinsky District of Novosibirsk Oblast

== See also ==
- Alexandro-Nevsky Zavod, a rural locality (a selo) in Kuytunsky District of Irkutsk Oblast
- Alexandro-Nevskaya Stanitsa, a rural locality (a village) in Kuytunsky District of Irkutsk Oblast
- Alexandronevskaya, a rural locality (a stanitsa) in Vyselkovsky District of Krasnodar Krai
