= Astrodym (village) =

Village in Novosibirsk Oblast, Russia

Astrodym Астродым
- Village
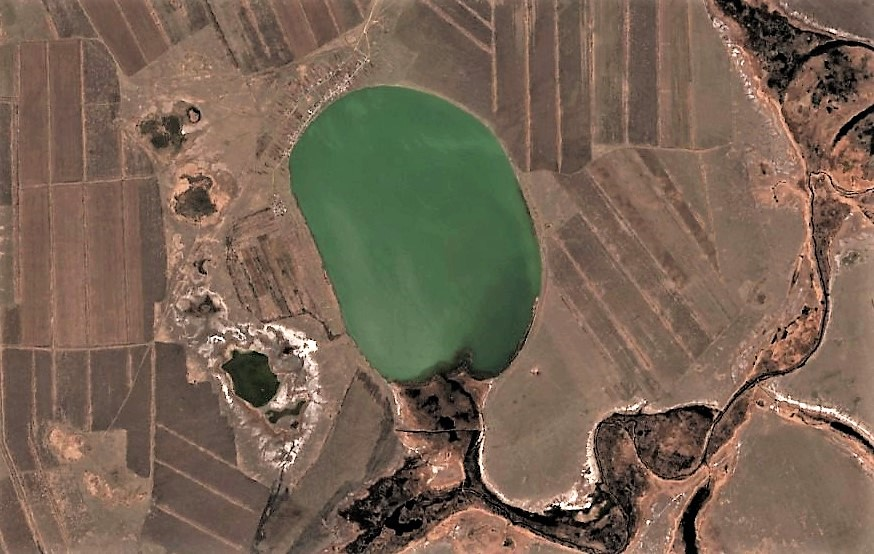
- Astrodym village in the upper left

- Location within Novosibirsk Oblast Location within Russia
- Coordinates: 53°38′28″N 77°45′59″E
- Country: Russia
- Region: Novosibirsk Oblast
- District: Karasuksky District
- Village Council: Troitsky Village Council
- Time zone: UTC+7:00
- Postcode: 632842

Astrodym (Russian: Астродым) is a rural locality (a selo) in Karasuksky District, Novosibirsk Oblast, Russia. It is part of the Troitsky Village Council.

Population: 350 (2010 census); 348 (2002 census);

== Geography ==
Astrodym lies in the Baraba Steppe on the shore of the lake of the same name. River Karasuk flows to the south. Studyonoye village is located 16 km (9.9 mi) to the west and Karasuk railway station 30 km (19 mi) to the northeast by road.
