= Karasuk =

Karasuk may refer to:

- Karasuk culture, a group of Bronze Age societies
- Karasuk languages, a hypothetical language family linking the Yeniseian languages and Burushaski
- Karasuk Urban Settlement, a municipal formation which the Town of Karasuk in Karasuksky District of Novosibirsk Oblast, Russia is incorporated as
- Karasuk (inhabited locality), several inhabited localities in Russia
- Karasuk (river), a river in Novosibirsk Oblast, Russia
