= Krasny Khutor (Krasnozyorsky District) =

Village in Novosibirsk Oblast, Russia

Krasny Khutor Красный Хутор
- Village
- Location within Novosibirsk Oblast Location within Russia
- Coordinates: 53°57′39″N 79°15′25″E
- Country: Russia
- Region: Novosibirsk Oblast
- District: Krasnozyorsky District
- Village Council: Kaigorodsky Village Council
- Time zone: UTC+7:00
- Postcode: 632901

Krasny Khutor (Russian: Красный Хутор) is a rural locality (village) in Krasnozyorsky District, Novosibirsk Oblast, Russia. It is part of the Kaigorodsky Village Council.

Population: 497 (2010 census); 466 (2002 census);

== Geography ==
Krasny Khutor lies in the southern part of the Baraba Plain, close to the left bank of the Karasuk. Krasnozyorskoye, the district capital, lies only 1.5 kilometers (0.93 mi) to the northwest.
