= Karasuk (inhabited locality) =

Karasuk (Russian: Карасук) is the name of several inhabited localities in Russia.

Urban localities

- Karasuk, Novosibirsk Oblast, a town in Karasuksky District, Novosibirsk Oblast

Rural localities

- Karasuk, Altai Krai, a selo in Kokshinsky Selsoviet of Sovetsky District of Altai Krai
- Karasuk, Altai Republic, a selo in Kyzyl-Ozekskoye Rural Settlement of Mayminsky District of the Altai Republic
- Karasuk, Republic of Khakassia, a village in Bolsheyerbinsky Selsoviet of Bogradsky District of the Republic of Khakassia
