= Khabarovsky =

Khabarovsky (masculine), Khabarovskaya (feminine), or Khabarovskoye (neuter) may refer to:

- Khabarovsk Krai (Khabarovsky Krai), a federal subject of Russia
- Khabarovsky District, a district of Khabarovsk Krai, Russia
- Khabarovsky (village), a rural locality in Novosibirsk Oblast, Russia
- Khabarovskaya, a rural locality in Irkutsk Oblast, Russia

== See also ==
- Khabarovsk (disambiguation)
- Khabarsky (disambiguation)
