= Yarok (rural locality) =

Yarok (Russian: Ярок) is the name of several rural localities in Russia:

- Yarok, Novosibirsk Oblast, a settlement under the administrative jurisdiction of the Town of Karasuk in Karasuksky District of Novosibirsk Oblast
- Yarok, Tambov Oblast, a selo in Starokazinsky Selsoviet of Michurinsky District in Tambov Oblast
