= Stretynka (Novosibirsk Oblast) =

Village in Novosibirsk Oblast, Russia

Stretynka Стретинка
- Village
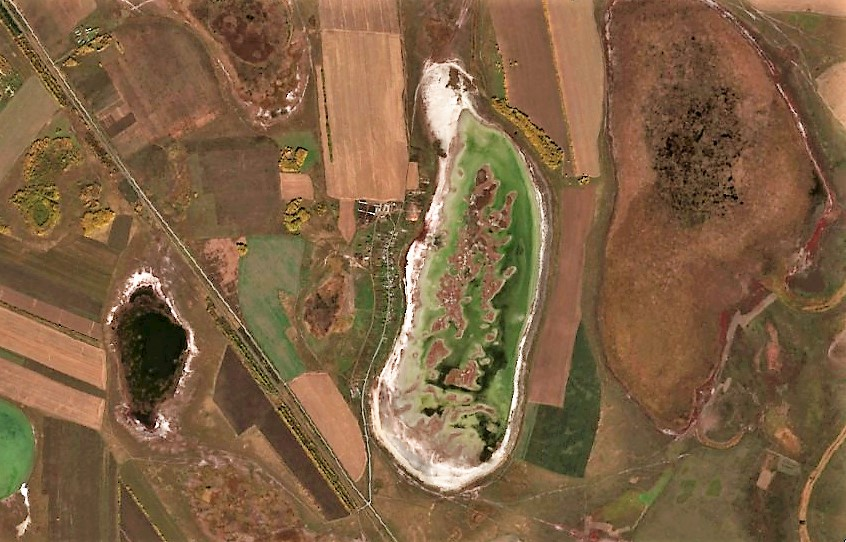
- Stretynka Sentinel-2 image

- Location within Novosibirsk Oblast Location within Russia
- Coordinates: 54°03′00″N 77°44′58″E
- Country: Russia
- Region: Novosibirsk Oblast
- District: Bagansky District
- Village Council: Bagansky Village Council
- Established: 1908
- Time zone: UTC+7:00
- Postcode: 632770

Stretynka (Russian: Стретинка) is a rural locality (a selo). It is part of the Bagansky Village Council of Bagansky District, Novosibirsk Oblast, Russia. Population: 181 (2010 census); 191 (2002 census);

== Geography ==
Stretynka lies by a shallow salt lake in the southern part of the Baraba Plain, 5 km (3.1 mi) to the southeast of Bagan, the district capital. Tychkino is located 5 km (3.1 mi) to the northeast and Savkino 18 km (11 mi) to the SSE. The Bagan river flows near the town. Lake Mochan lies 7 km (4.3 mi) to the southeast.
