= Krasnozyorsky =

Krasnozyorsky/Krasnozersky (masculine), Krasnozyorskaya/Krasnozerskaya (feminine), or Krasnozyorskoye/Krasnozerskoye (neuter) may refer to:

- Krasnozyorsky District, a district of Novosibirsk Oblast, Russia
- Krasnozyorskoye, an urban locality (a work settlement) in Krasnozyorsky District of Novosibirsk Oblast, Russia
