= Studyonoye (lake) =

Lake in Russia

- Студёное
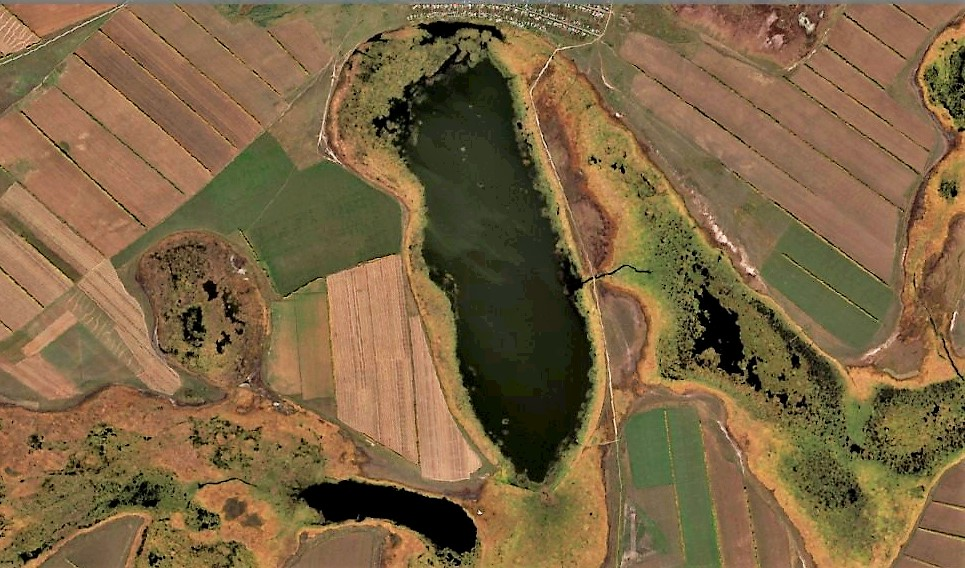
- Sentinel-2 picture of the lake

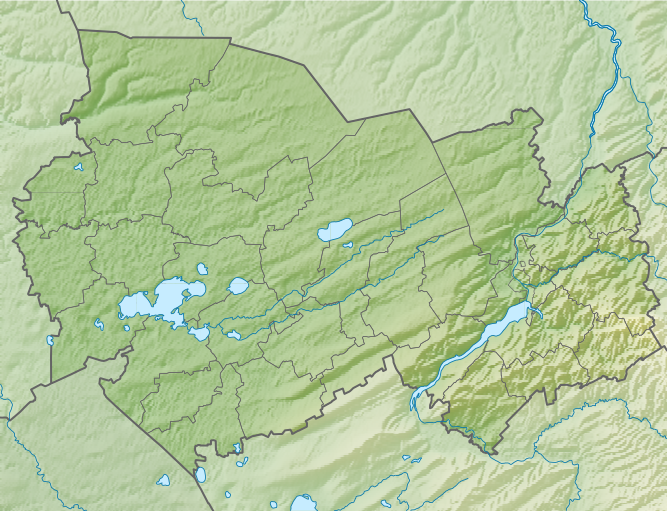
- Location within Novosibirsk Oblast Location within Russia
- Location: Baraba Lowland; West Siberian Plain
- Coordinates: 53°35′10″N 77°32′10″E
- Type: endorheic lake
- Primary inflows: Karasuk
- Catchment area: 8,590 square kilometers (3,320 sq mi)
- Basin countries: Russia
- Max. length: 5.6 kilometers (3.5 mi)
- Max. width: 1.7 kilometers (1.1 mi)
- Surface area: 8.6 square kilometers (3.3 sq mi)
- Residence time: UTC+7
- Surface elevation: 101 meters (331 ft)
- Islands: none
- Settlements: Studyonoye

Studyonoye (Russian: Студёное) is a lake in Karasuksky District, Novosibirsk Oblast, Russian Federation.

The lake is located at the southwestern end of the Oblast. The nearest inhabited place is Studyonoye, located by the northern lakeshore. Karasuk, the district capital, lies 42 kilometers (26 mi) to the northeast.

== Geography ==
Studyonoye lies in the transitional zone between the Baraba Lowland and the Kulunda Steppe, West Siberian Plain. It is part of the Karasuk river basin of the Ob-Irtysh interfluve. The lake has an elongated shape, stretching from north to south for almost 6 kilometers (3.7 mi). Smaller lake Zimneye is located close to the southwest of the southern end. The mouth of the Karasuk river lies in the middle of the eastern shore. The river reaches the lake in years of abundant water. Lake Chagan straddles the Kazakhstan–Russia border 10 kilometers (6.2 mi) to the south, Astrodym lies 13 kilometers (8.1 mi) to the east, Bolshoye Topolnoye 30 kilometers (19 mi) to the southeast, and Mochan 43 kilometers (27 mi) to the NNE.

== Flora and fauna ==
Lake Studyonoye is surrounded by steppe vegetation. Reeds grow in the shallow shoreline of the lake.

== See also ==
- List of lakes of Russia
