= Loktyonok =

Village in Novosibirsk Oblast, Russia

Loktyonok Локтёнок
- Village
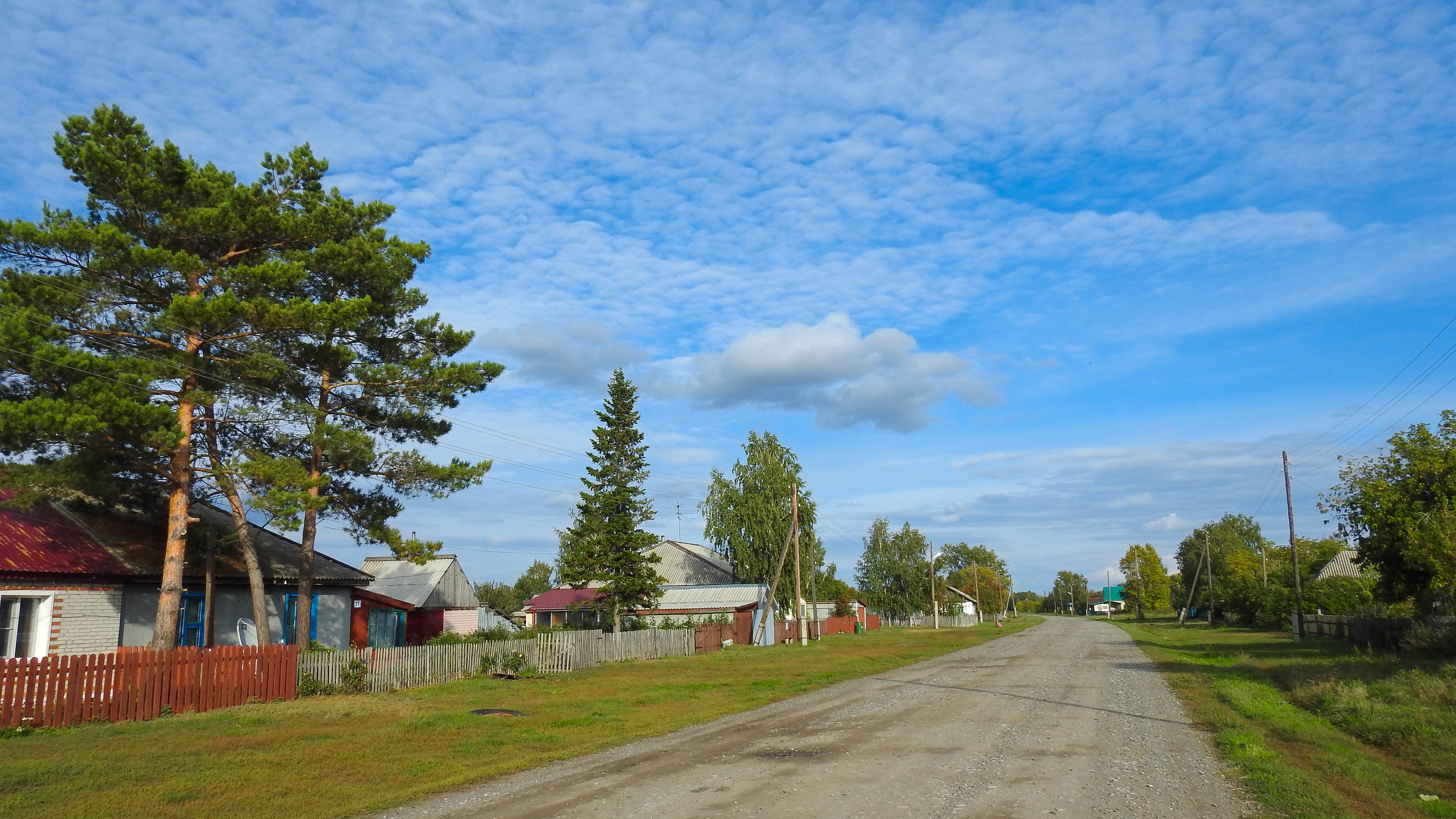
- View of a village street

- Location within Novosibirsk Oblast Location within Russia
- Coordinates: 53°57′28″N 79°01′14″E
- Country: Russia
- Region: Novosibirsk Oblast
- District: Krasnozyorsky District
- Village Council: Kolybelsky Village Council
- Established: 16th century
- Time zone: UTC+7:00
- Postcode: 632911

Loktyonok (Russian: Локтёнок) is a rural locality (village) in Krasnozyorsky District, Novosibirsk Oblast, Russia. It is part of the Kolybelsky Village Council.

Population: 481 (2010 census); 554 (2002 census);

== Geography ==
Loktyonok lies in the southern part of the Baraba Plain, straddling both banks of the Karasuk. There are a number of oxbow lakes in the vicinity, the largest of which is Kornoukhovo, to the southeast of the village. Krasnozyorskoye, the district capital, lies 14 kilometers (8.7 mi) to the ENE.
