= Astrodym (lake) =

Lake in Russia

- Астродым
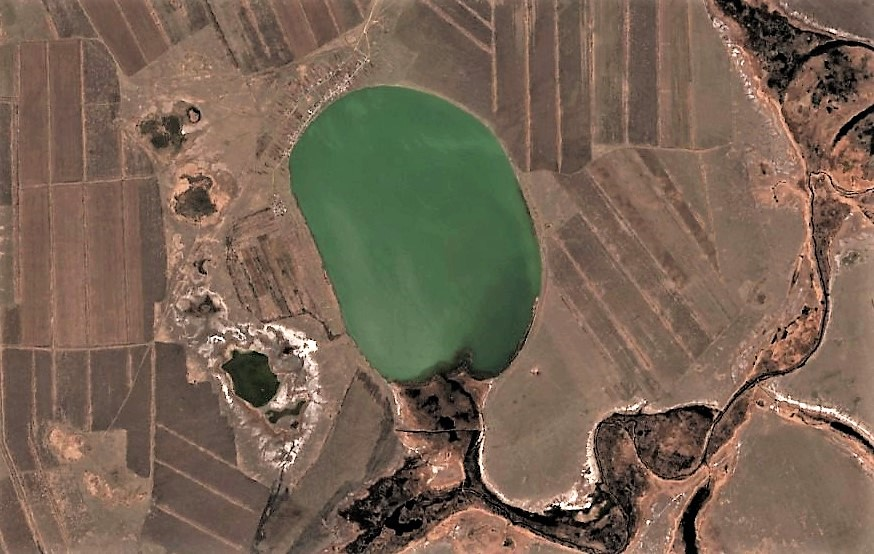
- Sentinel-2 picture of the lake

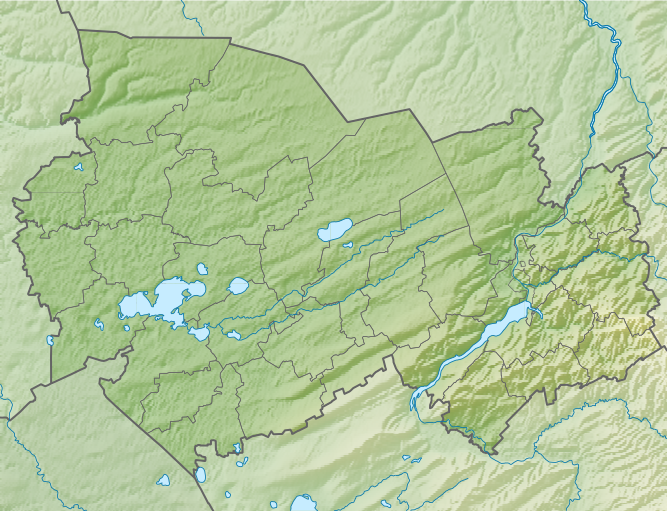
- Location within Novosibirsk Oblast Location within Russia
- Location: Baraba Lowland; West Siberian Plain
- Coordinates: 53°37′47″N 77°47′04″E
- Type: fluvial lake
- Catchment area: 8,590 square kilometers (3,320 sq mi)
- Basin countries: Russia
- Max. length: 3.9 kilometers (2.4 mi)
- Max. width: 2.6 kilometers (1.6 mi)
- Surface area: 7.1 square kilometers (2.7 sq mi)
- Residence time: UTC+7
- Surface elevation: 103 meters (338 ft)
- Settlements: Astrodym

Astrodym (Russian: Астродым) is a lake in Karasuksky District, Novosibirsk Oblast, Russian Federation.

The lake is located at the southwestern end of the Oblast. The nearest inhabited place is Astrodym, located by the northwestern lakeshore. Karasuk, the district capital, lies 18 kilometers (11 mi) to the northeast.

== Geography ==
Astrodym lies in the Baraba Lowland, West Siberian Plain. It is part of the Karasuk river basin of the Ob-Irtysh interfluve. The lake has an oval shape, stretching from north to south for almost 4 kilometers (2.5 mi). The southern shore is joined to the lower reaches of the Karasuk river to the south via a channel flanked by a broad swampy area. Lake Studyonoye lies 13 kilometers (8.1 mi) to the west, Bolshoye Topolnoye 27 kilometers (17 mi) to the SSE, and Mochan 35 kilometers (22 mi) to the north.

== Flora and fauna ==
Reeds grow in the shallow shoreline of the lake.

== See also ==
- List of lakes of Russia
