= Alexandro-Nevsky =

Alexandro-Nevsky (masculine), Alexandro-Nevskaya (feminine), or Alexandro-Nevskoye (neuter) may refer to:

- Alexandro-Nevsky District, a district of Ryazan Oblast, Russia
- Alexandro-Nevsky (inhabited locality) (Alexandro-Nevskaya, Alexandro-Nevskoye), name of several inhabited localities in Russia
