= Kaigorodsky =

Village in Novosibirsk Oblast, Russia

Kaigorodsky Кайгородский
- Village
- Location within Novosibirsk Oblast Location within Russia
- Coordinates: 53°58′50″N 79°11′33″E
- Country: Russia
- Region: Novosibirsk Oblast
- District: Krasnozyorsky District
- Village Council: Kaigorodsky Village Council
- Time zone: UTC+7:00
- Postcode: 632901

Kaigorodsky (Russian: Кайгородский) is a rural locality (village) in Krasnozyorsky District, Novosibirsk Oblast, Russia. It is the administrative center of the Kaigorodsky Village Council.

Population: 631 (2010 census); 674 (2002 census);

== Geography ==
Kaigorodsky lies in the southern part of the Baraba Plain, close to the banks of the Karasuk River. Krasnozyorskoye, the district capital, lies only 0.5 kilometers (0.31 mi) to the east.
