= Kuchugur =

Village in Novosibirsk Oblast, Russia

Kuchugur Кучугур
- Village
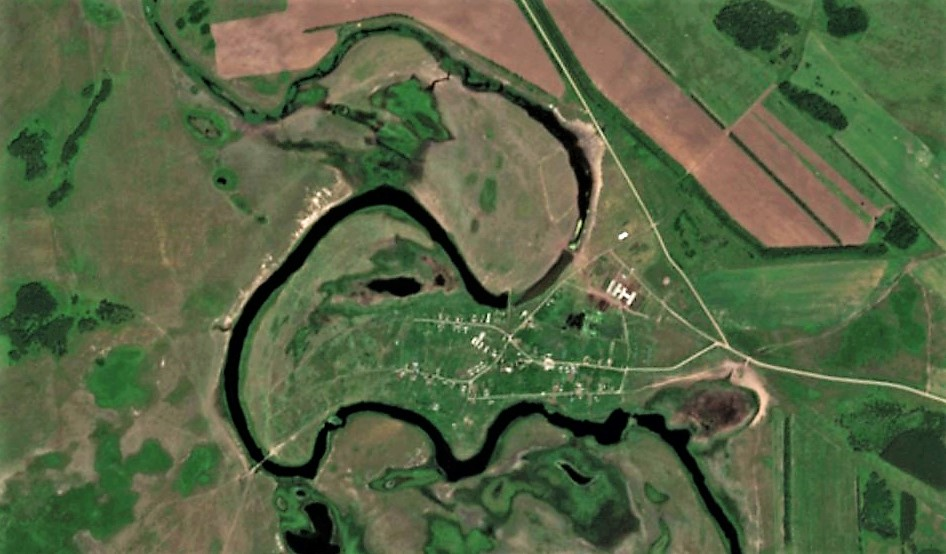
- Kuchugur Sentinel-2 image

- Location within Novosibirsk Oblast Location within Russia
- Coordinates: 53°59′43″N 78°12′54″E
- Country: Russia
- Region: Novosibirsk Oblast
- District: Karasuksky District
- Village Council: Chernokuryinsky Village Council
- Elevation: 109 m (358 ft)
- Time zone: UTC+7:00
- Postcode: 632858

Kuchugur (Russian: Кучугур) is a rural locality (village) in Karasuksky District, Novosibirsk Oblast, Russia. It is part of the Chernokuryinsky Village Council.

Population: 255 (2010 census); 432 (2002 census);

== Geography ==
Kuchugur lies in the southern part of the Baraba Plain, close to the eastern banks of the Baganyonok river and 4 km (2.5 mi) to the south of Bolshiye Luki, and 13 km (8.1 mi) to the north of Nizhnebayanovsky.
