= Tychkino (Bagansky District) =

Village in Novosibirsk Oblast, Russia

Tychkino Тычкино
- Village
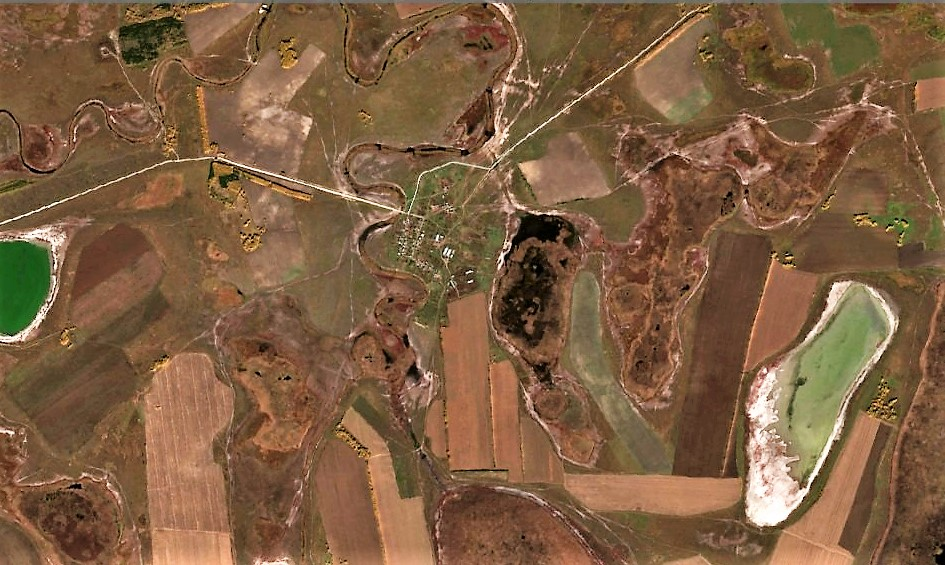
- Tychkino Sentinel-2 image

- Location within Novosibirsk Oblast Location within Russia
- Coordinates: 54°06′21″N 77°47′08″E
- Country: Russia
- Region: Novosibirsk Oblast
- District: Bagansky District
- Village Council: Bagansky Village Council
- Time zone: UTC+7:00
- Postcode: 632770

Tychkino (Russian: Тычкино) is a rural locality (a selo). It is part of the Bagansky Village Council of Bagansky District, Novosibirsk Oblast, Russia. Population: 295 (2010 census); 304 (2002 census);

== Geography ==
Tychkino lies in the southern part of Baraba Plain, 4 km (2.5 mi) to the east of Bagan, the district capital. Stretynka is located 5 km (3.1 mi) to the southwest and Vladimirovka 14 km (8.7 mi) to the northeast. The Bagan river flows near the town.
