= Khabarovsky (village) =

Village in Novosibirsk Oblast, Russia

Khabarovsky Хабаровский
- Village
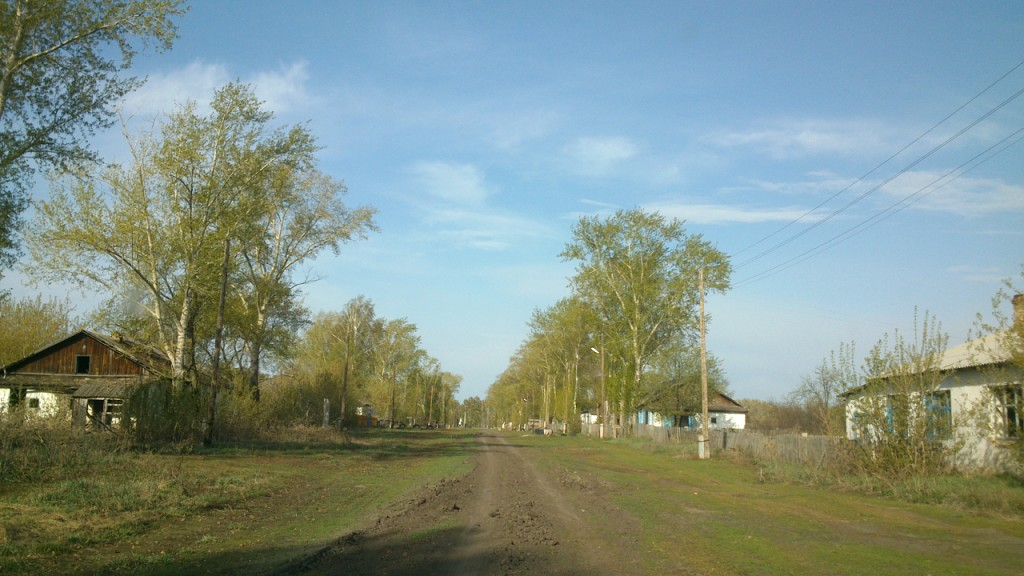
- View of a street

- Location within Novosibirsk Oblast Location within Russia
- Coordinates: 53°50′43″N 79°45′46″E
- Country: Russia
- Region: Novosibirsk Oblast
- District: Krasnozyorsky District
- Village Council: Oktyabrsky Village Council
- Time zone: UTC+7:00
- Postcode: 632921

Khabarovsky (Russian: Хабаровский) is a rural locality (village) in Krasnozyorsky District, Novosibirsk Oblast, Russia. It is part of the Oktyabrsky Village Council.

Population: 113 (2010 census); 195 (2002 census);

== Geography ==
Khabarovsky is located in the southern part of the Baraba Plain, close to the Altai Krai border. Krasnozyorskoye, the district capital, lies roughly 35 kilometers (22 mi) to the northwest.
