= Novy Baganyonok =

Village in Novosibirsk Oblast, Russia

Novy Baganyonok Новый Баганёнок
- Village
- Location within Novosibirsk Oblast Location within Russia
- Coordinates: 53°51′56″N 78°43′19″E
- Country: Russia
- Region: Novosibirsk Oblast
- District: Krasnozyorsky District
- Village Council: Veselovsky Village Council
- Time zone: UTC+7:00
- Postcode: 632945

Novy Baganyonok (Russian: Новый Баганёнок) is a rural locality (village) in Krasnozyorsky District, Novosibirsk Oblast, Russia. It is part of the Veselovsky Village Council.

Population: 398 (2010 census); 549 (2002 census);

== Geography ==
Novy Baganyonok lies in the southern part of the Baraba Plain, by the right bank of the Karasuk. Krasnozyorskoye, the district capital, lies approximately 35 kilometers (22 mi) to the northeast.
