= Baganyonok =

River in Siberia, Russia

Baganyonok Баганёнок
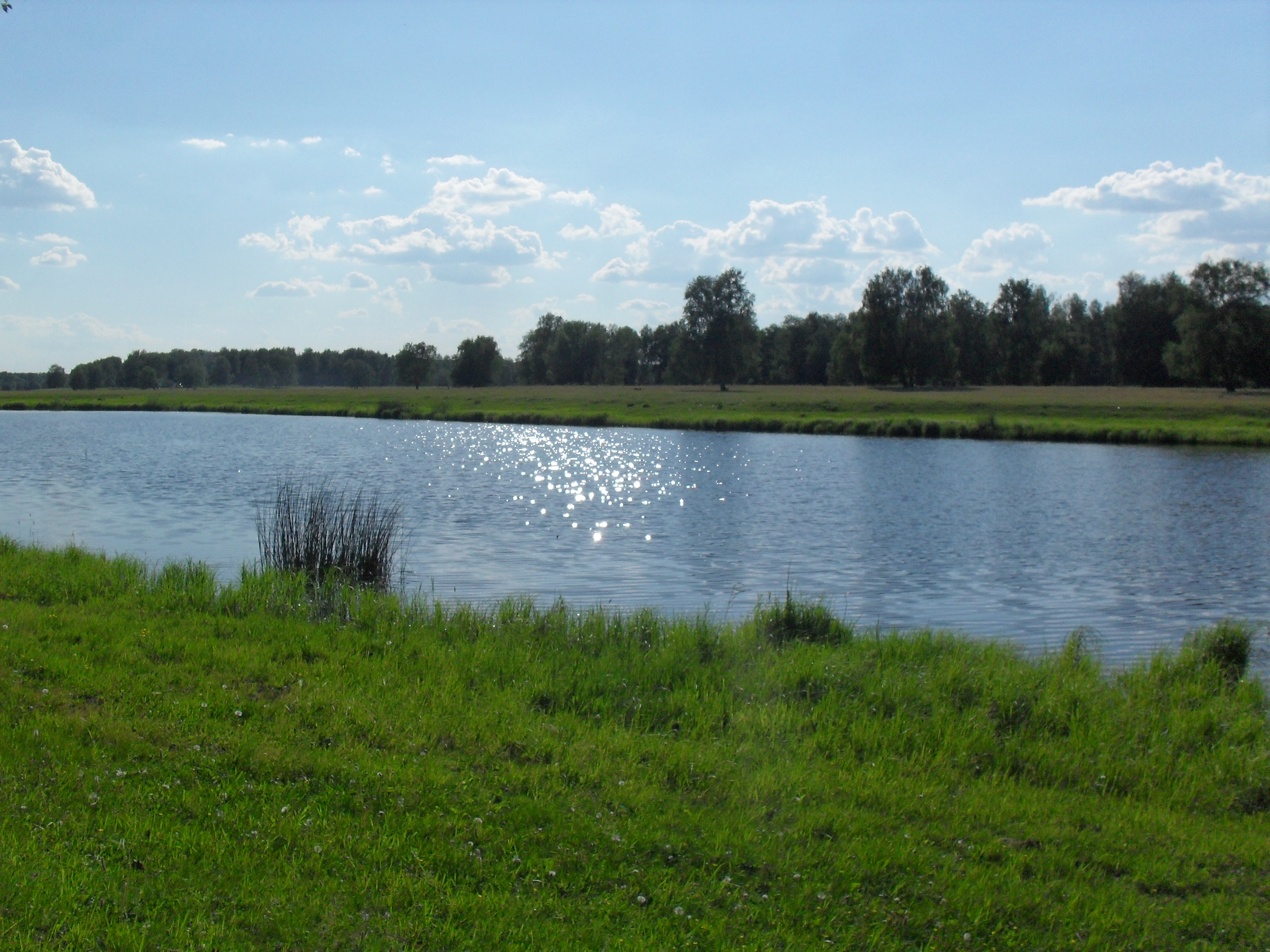
- View of the Baganyonok

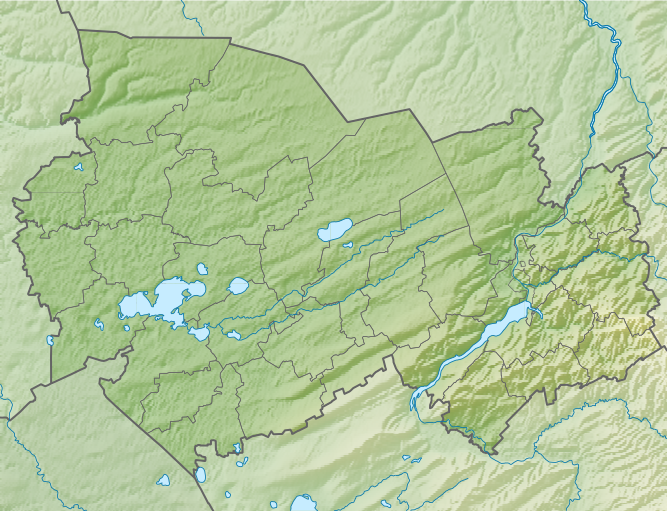
- Mouth location in Novosibirsk Oblast, Russia

Location
- Country: Russia

Physical characteristics
- Source: Nizhnecheremoshnoye
  - coordinates: 53°57′10″N 78°53′23″E
  - elevation: 122 m (400 ft)
- Mouth: Bagan (river)
  - coordinates: 54°04′34″N 78°06′57″E
  - elevation: 105 m (344 ft)
- Length: 180 km (110 mi)
- Basin size: 898 km^{2} (347 sq mi)

The Baganyonok (Russian: Баганёнок) is a river in Novosibirsk Oblast, Russia. The river is 189 kilometres (117 mi) long and has a catchment area of 898 square kilometres (347 sq mi).

The basin of the river is located in the Krasnozyorsky, Bagansky, and Karasuksky districts. Since 1994 there is a 26,880 ha (66,400 acres) Ramsar site in the lower course of the river. Natural monument Stepnaya Catena is located by the right bank of the Baganyonok, 9 km (5.6 mi) northwest of the village of Novy Baganyonok.

== Course ==
The Baganyonok belongs to the endorheic Bagan river basin of the southern Baraba Plain, between the Ob and the Irtysh rivers. The sources are in a swamp in Nizhnecheremoshnoye village, to the north of the winding channel of the Karasuk. The river meanders across a flat area dotted with lakes. It flows first in a roughly western direction and about midway along its course it turns and flows northwards. Finally it joins the left bank of the Bagan 129 km (80 mi) from its mouth.

There are a number of villages near the banks of the Baganyonok, such as Nizhnebayanovsky, Kuchugur and Bolshiye Luki, as well as the now disappeared settlement of Novonikolayevka at 53°52′30″N 78°29′22″E.

== See also ==
- List of rivers of Russia
