= Bolshiye Luki (Novosibirsk Oblast) =

Village in Novosibirsk Oblast, Russia

Bolshiye Luki Большие Луки
- Village
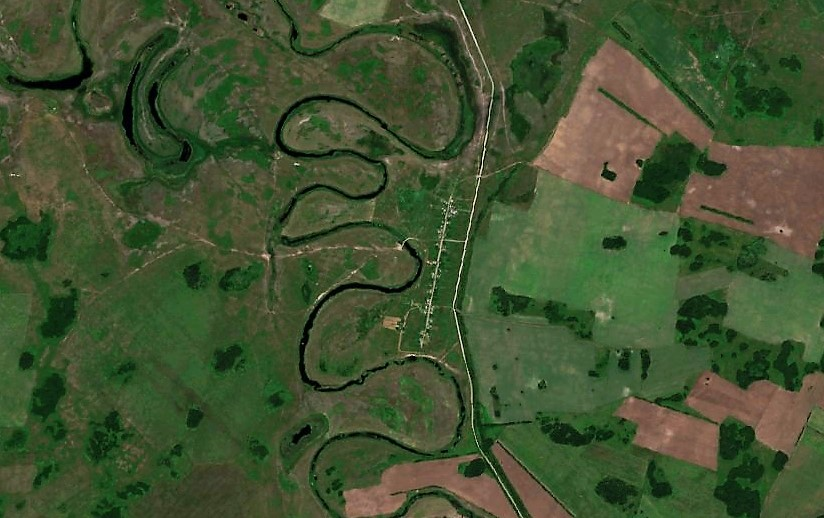
- Bolshiye Luki Sentinel-2 image

- Location within Novosibirsk Oblast Location within Russia
- Coordinates: 54°02′03″N 78°12′05″E
- Country: Russia
- Region: Novosibirsk Oblast
- District: Bagansky District
- Village Council: Paletsky Village Council
- Established: 1908
- Time zone: UTC+7:00
- Postcode: 632776

Bolshiye Luki (Russian: Большие Луки) is a rural locality (village) in Bagansky District, Novosibirsk Oblast, Russia. It is part of the Paletsky Village Council.

Population: 206 (2010 census); 269 (2002 census);

== Geography ==
Bolshiye Luki lies in the southern part of the Baraba Plain, close to the banks of the Baganyonok river and 4 km (2.5 mi) to the north of Kuchugur.
