= Osinniki (Novosibirsk Oblast) =

Village in Novosibirsk Oblast, Russia

Osinniki Осинники
- Village
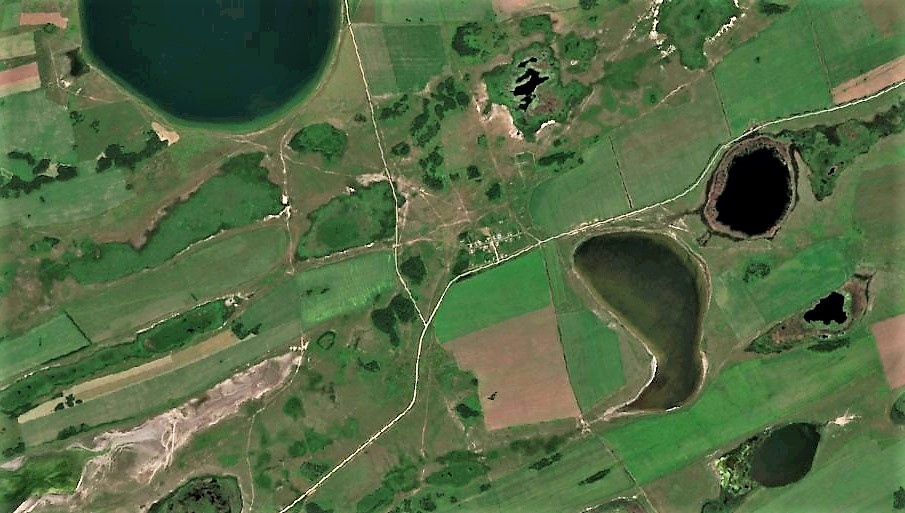
- Osinniki between the two lakes named Gorkoye Sentinel-2 image

- Location within Novosibirsk Oblast Location within Russia
- Coordinates: 54°12′07″N 78°01′26″E
- Country: Russia
- Region: Novosibirsk Oblast
- District: Bagansky District
- Village Council: Paletsky Village Council
- Time zone: UTC+7:00
- Postcode: 632775

Osinniki (Russian: Осинники) is a rural locality (village) in Bagansky District, Novosibirsk Oblast, Russia . It is part of the Paletsky Village Council. Population: 146 (2010 census); 219 (2002 census);

== Geography ==
Osinniki lies in the southern part of the Baraba Plain 2.5 km (1.6 mi) to the southeast of lake Gorkoye and close to the northwest of a smaller lake also named Gorkoye. The nearest inhabited places are Novoklyuchi, located 4 km (2.5 mi) to the north, and Vladimirovka 8 km (5.0 mi) to the southwest.
