= Nizhnebayanovsky =

Village in Novosibirsk Oblast, Russia

Nizhnebayanovsky Нижнебаяновский
- Village
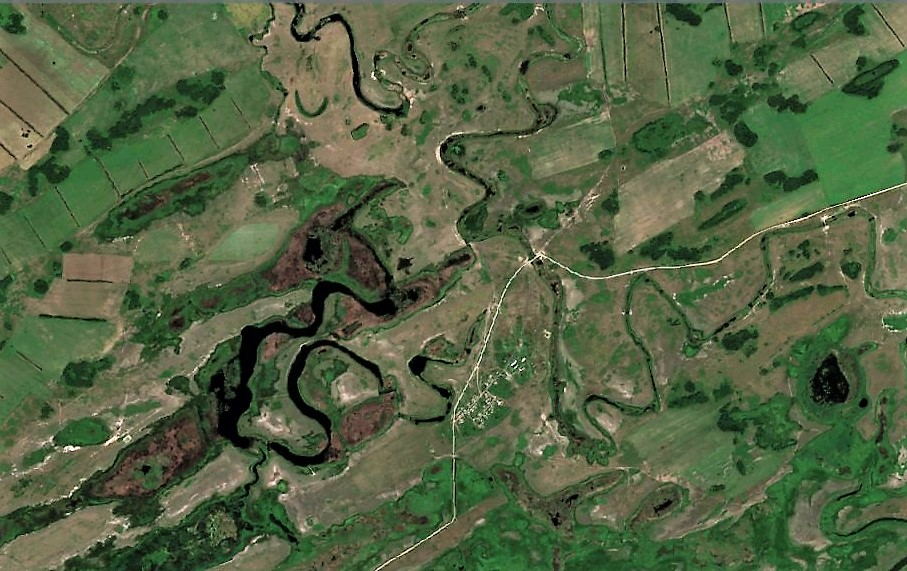
- Nizhnebayanovsky Sentinel-2 image

- Location within Novosibirsk Oblast Location within Russia
- Coordinates: 53°51′40″N 78°14′25″E
- Country: Russia
- Region: Novosibirsk Oblast
- District: Karasuksky District
- Village Council: Chernokuryinsky Village Council
- Time zone: UTC+7:00
- Postcode: 632857

Nizhnebayanovsky (Russian: Нижнебаяновский) "Lower Bayanovsky" is a rural locality (village) in Karasuksky District, Novosibirsk Oblast, Russia. It is part of the Chernokuryinsky Village Council.

Population: 165 (2010 census); 234 (2002 census);

== Geography ==
Nizhnebayanovsky lies in the southern part of the Baraba Plain, close to the bend in the Baganyonok river where it turns from westwards to northwards. It is located 8 km (5.0 mi) to the west of Chernokurya, and 13 km (8.1 mi) to the south of Kuchugur.
