= Nizhnecheremoshnoye =

Village in Novosibirsk Oblast, Russia

Nizhnecheremoshnoye Нижнечеремошное
- Village
- Location within Novosibirsk Oblast Location within Russia
- Coordinates: 53°57′09″N 78°53′44″E
- Country: Russia
- Region: Novosibirsk Oblast
- District: Krasnozyorsky District
- Village Council: Nizhnecheremoshynsky Village Council
- Established: 1892
- Time zone: UTC+7:00
- Postcode: 632946

Nizhnecheremoshnoye (Russian: Нижнечеремошное), "Lower Cheremoshnoye", is a rural locality (village) in Krasnozyorsky District, Novosibirsk Oblast, Russia. It is the administrative center of the Nizhnecheremoshynsky Village Council.

Population: 850 (2010 census); 1,021 (2002 census);

== Geography ==
Nizhnecheremoshnoye lies in the southern part of the Baraba Plain, close to the northern banks of the Karasuk. The sources of the Baganyonok river are located in the village area.
