= Voskresenka (Bagansky District) =

Village in Novosibirsk Oblast, Russia

Voskresenka Воскресенка
- Village
- Location within Novosibirsk Oblast Location within Russia
- Coordinates: 53°54′29″N 77°45′52″E
- Country: Russia
- Region: Novosibirsk Oblast
- District: Bagansky District
- Village Council: Mironovsky Village Council
- Time zone: UTC+7:00
- Postcode: 632783

Voskresenka (Russian: Воскресенка) is a rural locality (a selo). It is part of the Mironovsky Village Council of Bagansky District, Novosibirsk Oblast, Russia. Population: 270 (2010 census); 291 (2002 census);

== Geography ==
Voskresenka lies in the southern part of Baraba Plain. Savkino is located 8 km (5.0 mi) to the east and Kuznetsovka 15 km (9.3 mi) to the west. Lake Mochan lies 8 km (5.0 mi) to the northeast.
