= Studyonoye (Novosibirsk Oblast) =

Village in Novosibirsk Oblast, Russia

Studyonoye Студёное
- Village
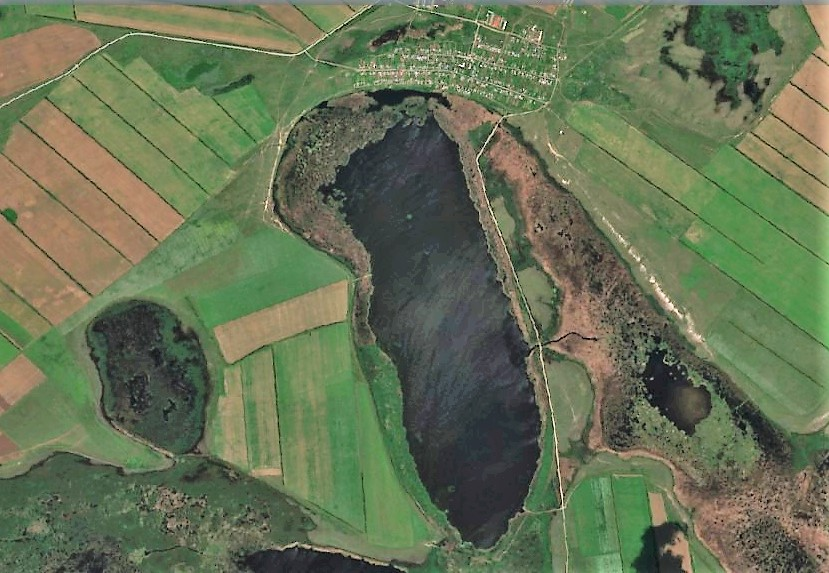
- Studyonoye village by the northern end of the lake Sentinel-2 image

- Location within Novosibirsk Oblast Location within Russia
- Coordinates: 53°36′48″N 77°32′01″E
- Country: Russia
- Region: Novosibirsk Oblast
- District: Karasuksky District
- Village Council: Studyonovsky Village Council
- Time zone: UTC+7:00
- Postcode: 632844

Studyonoye (Russian: Студёное) is a rural locality (village) in Karasuksky District, Novosibirsk Oblast, Russia. It is the administrative center of the Studyonovsky Village Council. Formerly it was known as Spasovka.

Population: 988 (2010 census); 1,113 (2002 census);

== Geography ==
Studyonoye lies in the southern part of the Baraba Plain, by the lake of the same name and a little to the north of the mouth of the Karasuk. The Russia-Kazakhstan border lies 10 kilometers (6.2 mi) to the southwest, and Karasuk, the district capital, approximately 45 kilometers (28 mi) to the northeast.
