= Kuznetsovka (Bagansky District) =

Village in Novosibirsk Oblast, Russia

Kuznetsovka Кузнецовка
- Village
- Location within Novosibirsk Oblast Location within Russia
- Coordinates: 53°54′49″N 77°33′16″E
- Country: Russia
- Region: Novosibirsk Oblast
- District: Bagansky District
- Village Council: Kuznetsovsky Village Council
- Time zone: UTC+7:00
- Postcode: 632790

Kuznetsovka (Russian: Кузнецовка) is a rural locality (a selo). It is the administrative center of the Kuznetsovsky Village Council of Bagansky District, Novosibirsk Oblast, Russia. Population: 521 (2021 census); 559 (2010 census);

== Geography ==
Kuznetsovka lies in the southern part of Baraba Plain. Voskresenka is located 12 km (7.5 mi) to the east and Savkino 22 km (14 mi) in the same direction.
