= Gorkoye (Novosibirsk Oblast) =

- Горькое
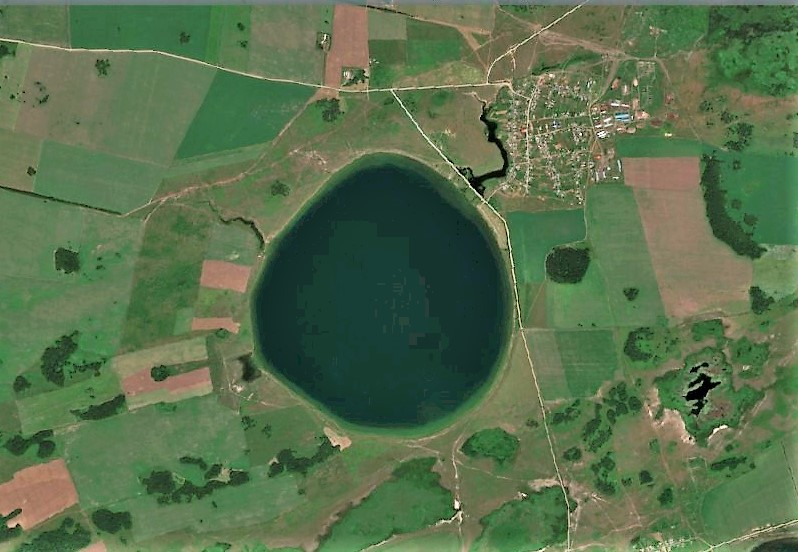
- Lake and Novoklyuchi village Sentinel-2 image

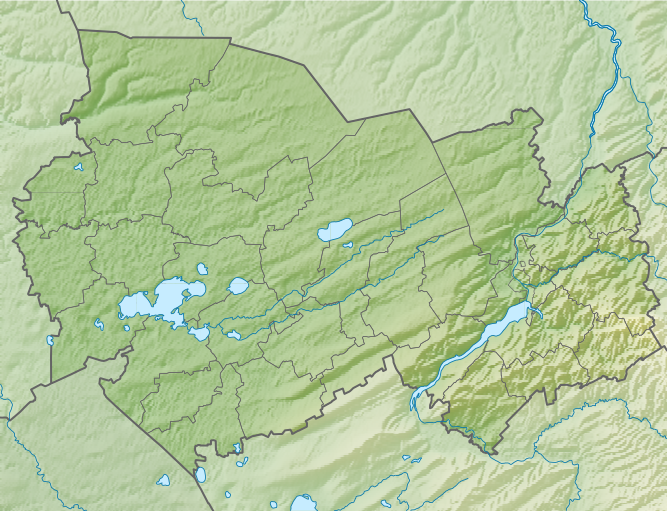
- Location of Lake Gorkoye in Novosibirsk Oblast
- Location: Novosibirsk Oblast, Russia
- Coordinates: 54°13′38″N 77°58′40″E
- Type: Salt lake
- Catchment area: 126 square kilometers (49 sq mi)
- Max. length: 3.1 kilometers (1.9 mi)
- Max. width: 2.7 kilometers (1.7 mi)
- Surface area: 7.417 square kilometers (2.864 sq mi)
- Islands: none
- Settlements: Novoklyuchi

Gorkoye (Russian: Горькое) is a salt lake on the border between Bagansky and Kupinsky districts of Novosibirsk Oblast, Russia.

== Description ==
Gorkoye is almost round in shape. Its area is 741.7 741.7 hectares (1,833 acres). The lake is located 47 kilometers from Kupino near the village of Novoklyuchi, about 416 kilometers (258 mi) from Novosibirsk. 2.5 km (1.6 mi) to the southeast there is a smaller lake also named Gorkoye, close to Osinniki village.

The lake contains a high concentration of salt.

In winter the lake does not freeze, and in autumn it forms a large amount of saltpeter.

== Fauna ==
The lake is inhabited by orange-coloured crustaceans from the genus Artemia with a length of about 7 mm.

== Tourism ==
Along the coast of the lake, about 60 small wooden houses have been built for tourists. The curative mud from the lake is popular among visitors.

== See also ==
- List of lakes of Russia
