= Alexandro-Nevsky, Novosibirsk Oblast =

Village in Russia

Alexandro-Nevsky Александро-Невский
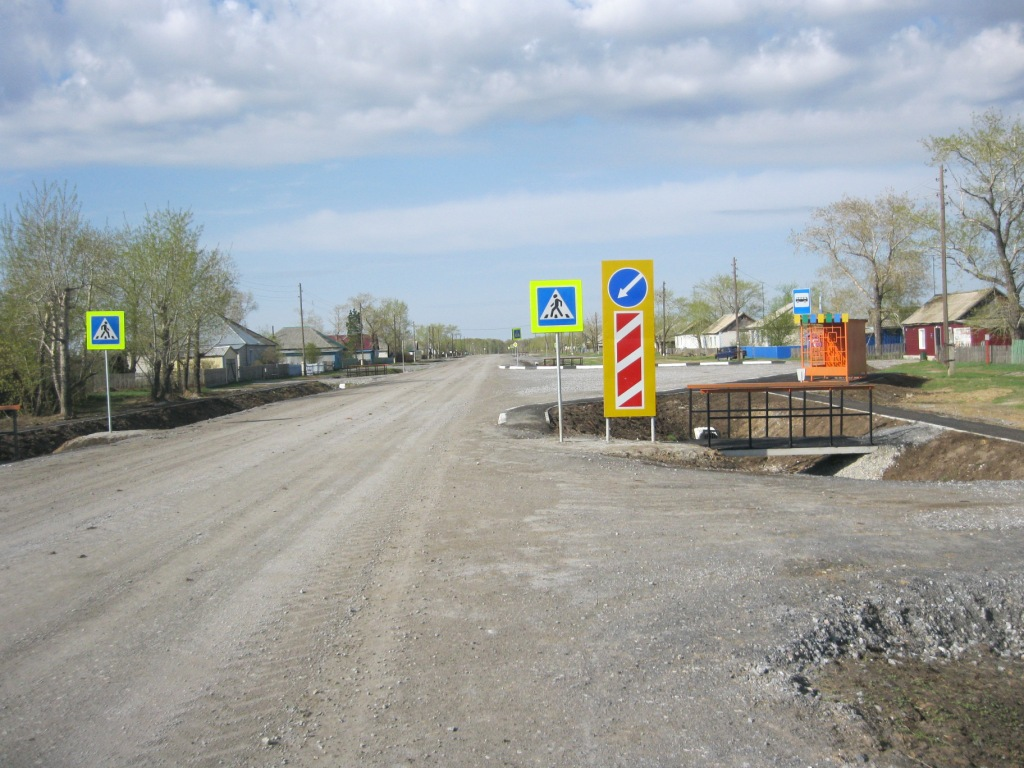

- Location within Novosibirsk Oblast Location within Russia
- Coordinates: 54°01′18″N 77°23′40″E
- Country: Russia
- Region: Novosibirsk Oblast
- District: Bagansky District
- Village Council: Kazansky Village Council
- Time zone: UTC+7:00
- Postcode: 632700

Alexandro-Nevsky (Russian: Александро-Невский) is a rural locality (a selo). It is part of the Kazansky Village Council of Bagansky District, Novosibirsk Oblast, Russia. Population: 217 (2010 census); 296 (2002 census);
