= Sergey Bizyukin =

Russian activist, journalist and historian

- Born: January 13, 1982 (age 44); Alexandro-Nevsky, Ryazan Oblast
- Education: Ph.D.
- Alma mater: Ryazan State University
- Occupations: activist, journalist, writer, historian

Sergey Sergeyevich Bizyukin (Russian: Сергей Сергеевич Бизюкин; born 13 January 1982) is a Russian activist, journalist and historian.

== Biography ==
In November 2016 he started a petition to rename "Godless Street" in the Russian city Ryazan to "Donald Trump Street". The reason this was tried was to 'try and make Russia-US relations better'. According to Al Jazeera: "The petition generated some media buzz amid nascent Trumpomania, an unprecedented trend in Russia where anti-Americanism has for decades been part of the political DNA."

In 2010 Bizyukin was a Russian Orthodox cooperator of Opus Dei.

In 2013 Bizyukin was awarded with a Medal of the Order of St. Anna by Maria Vladimirovna, Grand Duchess of Russia.

On 14 December 2016, Bizyukin was announced as the independent candidate for the Russian presidential election in 2018.

In January 2018, mass media published information that a criminal case was being prepared against Bizyukin under article 280 of the Criminal Code of the Russian Federation ("Public calls for actions aimed at violating the territorial integrity of the Russian Federation"). According to media reports, the threat is associated with public calls for the return of Crimea to Ukraine, as well as an appeal to the military and law enforcement officers of the Russian Federation with an appeal to disobey commanders.

== Books ==
- Far East in the defensive strategy of the United Kingdom (1932 - 1939) (2011, ISBN 978-3-8433-1072-7)
- The birth of the leader. Start before it is too late (2013, ISBN 978-5-91940-689-1)
- Keys to Leadership (2016, ISBN 978-5-4474-4655-0)
- Flesh and Blood of Putin's Russia (2020, ASIN B08NJQJ4VV)
