= Piotr Nazarov =

Russian painter

Piotr Fedorovich Nazarov
- Born: 25 December 1921; Kochki, Novosibirsk Oblast, Soviet Russia
- Died: 19 April 1988 (aged 66); Leningrad, USSR
- Education: Repin Institute of Arts
- Known for: Painting
- Movement: Realism

Piotr Fedorovich Nazarov (Russian: Пё́тр Фё́дорович Наза́ров; 25 December 1921 – 19 April 1988) was a Soviet and Russian painter and art teacher, who lived and worked in Leningrad city, and who is regarded as one of representatives of the Leningrad school of painting.

== Biography ==
Piotr Fedorovich Nazarov was born on 25 December 1921 in the village of Kochki, Novosibirsk Oblast, Soviet Russia.

In 1931 Nazarov's family moved to Krasnoyarsk city, Eastern Siberia, where he spent his childhood and teenage years. This time impressions influenced in the future on the formation of the young artist and choose the theme for some his paintings.

In autumn 1940, Nazarov was drafted into the Red Army. He was a veteran of World War II, participated in the Great Patriotic War, he fought in the infantry in units of the 5th Army.

After demobilization in 1946, Nazarov came to Leningrad and entered at Tavricheskaya Art School, from which he graduated in 1950.

That same year, Nazarov joined the painting department of the Leningrad Institute of Painting, Sculpture and Architecture named after Ilya Repin, where he studied Piotr Belousov, Mikhail Platunov, Valery Pimenov.

In 1956 Nazarov graduated from Leningrad Institute of Painting, Sculpture and Architecture namen after Ilya Repin in Rudolf Frentz personal Art Studio. His graduation work was a historical painting named "Lenin at the opening of the first power plant in rural Kashino", dedicated to the start of industrialization in Soviet Russia (GOELRO plan).

During the years 1957–1970, Nazarov worked as an artist in various organizations in Leningrad, and he also painted commissions. Starting in 1957, Nazarov participated in art exhibitions. He painted genre and historical paintings, portraits, landscapes, still lifes, sketches from the life. His personal exhibition was in Leningrad in 1981.

Nazarov's characteristic variety of techniques, including decorative and plein air painting. The coloring of his work is saturated with a focus on the relationship of warm and cold tones and the contrast between light and shadow.

Nazarov was a member of the Leningrad Union of Artists since 1970. In years 1970–1988, Nazarov worked as Art Teacher in the Vera Mukhina Art Institute in Leningrad.

Piotr Fedorovich Nazarov died on 19 April 1988 in Leningrad aged 66. His paintings reside in art museums and private collections in Russia, England, in the U.S., Japan, and other countries.

== See also ==
- Leningrad School of Painting
- List of Russian artists
- List of 20th-century Russian painters
- List of painters of Saint Petersburg Union of Artists
- Saint Petersburg Union of Artists

== Bibliography ==
- Exhibition of works by Leningrad artists of 1960. Exhibition catalogue. - Leningrad: Khudozhnik RSFSR, 1963. -p. 13.
- Autumn Exhibition of works by Leningrad artists of 1962. Exhibition Catalogue. - Leningrad: : Khudozhnik RSFSR, 1962. - p. 19.
- The Leningrad Fine Arts Exhibition. - Leningrad: Khudozhnik RSFSR, 1964. - p. 35.
- Directory of members of the Leningrad branch of Union of Artists of Russian Federation. - Leningrad: Khudozhnik RSFSR, 1987. - p. 89.
- Sergei V. Ivanov. Unknown Socialist Realism. The Leningrad School. - Saint Petersburg: NP-Print Edition, 2007. – pp. 365, 390, 393, 394, 396–398, 402, 403, 405. ISBN 5-901724-21-6, ISBN 978-5-901724-21-7.
- Anniversary Directory graduates of Saint Petersburg State Academic Institute of Painting, Sculpture, and Architecture named after Ilya Repin, Russian Academy of Arts. 1915 - 2005. - Saint Petersburg: Pervotsvet Publishing House, 2007. P.76.
