= Khabarovsk (disambiguation) =

Khabarovsk is a city in Russia.

Khabarovsk may also refer to:

- Khabarovsk Bridge, a bridge across the Amur River in Russia
- Khabarovsk-class submarine, a class of nuclear-powered ballistic missile submarines employed by the Russian Navy
- Khabarovsk Krai, a federal subject of Russia
- Khabarovsk Urban Okrug, a municipal formation which the city of krai significance of Khabarovsk in Khabarovsk Krai, Russia is incorporated as
- Khabarovsk war crimes trials, Soviet trials of Japanese Army officers accused of war crimes

== See also ==
- Khabarovsk Novy Airport, an airport in Khabarovsk, Khabarovsk Krai, Russia
- Khabarovsky (disambiguation)
