= Bagan, Russia =

Bagan (Russian: Баган) is the name of several rural localities in Novosibirsk Oblast, Russia:

- Bagan, Bagansky District, the capital of the district
- Bagan, Dovolensky District, Novosibirsk Oblast, a settlement in Dovolensky District
