= Novoklyuchi =

Village in Novosibirsk Oblast, Russia

Novoklyuchi Новоключи
- Village
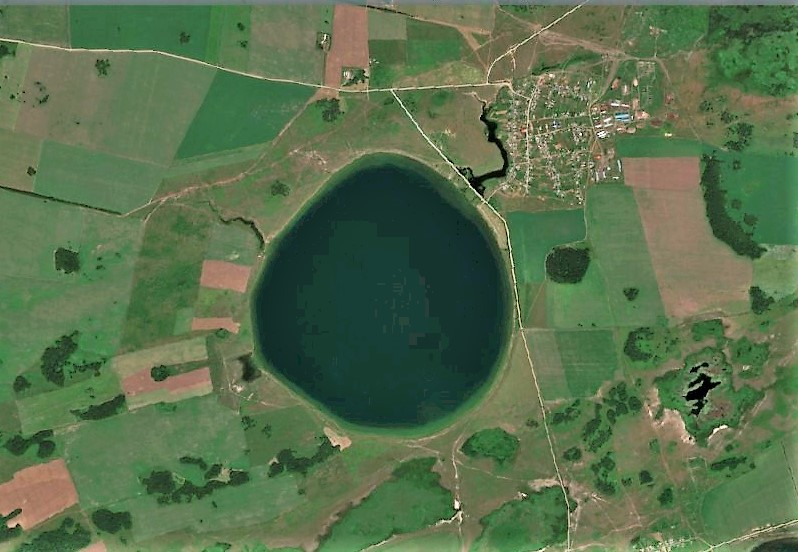
- Sentinel-2 image of lake Gorkoye with Novoklyuchi in the upper right

- Location within Novosibirsk Oblast Location within Russia
- Coordinates: 54°14′35″N 78°00′15″E
- Country: Russia
- Region: Novosibirsk Oblast
- District: Kupinsky District
- Village Council: Novoklyuchi Village Council
- Established: 1862
- Time zone: UTC+7:00
- Postcode: 632763

Novoklyuchi (Russian: Новоключи) is a rural locality (village) in Kupinsky District, Novosibirsk Oblast, Russia . It is the administrative center of the Novoklyuchi Village Council. Population: 799 (2010 census); 901 (2002 census);

== Geography ==
Novoklyuchi lies by lake Gorkoye in the southern part of the Baraba Plain. The nearest inhabited place is Osinniki, located 4 km (2.5 mi) to the south.
