= Khabarsky =

Khabarsky (masculine), Khabarskaya (feminine), or Khabarskoye (neuter) may refer to:

- Khabarsky District, a district in Altai Krai, Russia
- Khabarskoye, a rural locality (a village) in Nizhny Novgorod Oblast, Russia
