= Kuznetsovka (Arkhangelsky District) =

Kuznetsovka Кузнецовка
- Village
- Location within Bashkortostan Location within Russia
- Coordinates: 54°21′N 56°36′E
- Country: Russia
- Region: Bashkortostan
- District: Arkhangelsky District
- Time zone: UTC+5:00

Kuznetsovka (Russian: Кузнецовка) is a rural locality (a village) in Krasnozilimsky Selsoviet, Arkhangelsky District, Bashkortostan, Russia. The population was 13 as of 2010. There are 3 streets.

== Geography ==
Kuznetsovka is located 19 km southwest of Arkhangelskoye (the district's administrative centre) by road. Malyshovka is the nearest rural locality.
