= Kochkovsky District =

Kochkovsky District Кочковский район (Russian)
- District
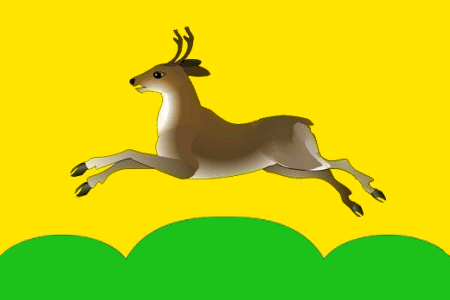
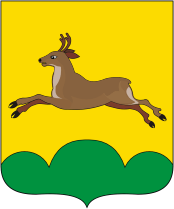
- Flag Coat of arms
- Location of Kochkovsky District in Novosibirsk Oblast
- Coordinates: 54°20′N 80°29′E
- Country: Russia
- Federal subject: Novosibirsk Oblast
- Established: 12 September 1924
- Administrative center: Kochki

Area
  - Total: 2,518 km^{2} (972 sq mi)

Population (2010 Census)
  - Total: 14,863
  - Density: 5.903/km^{2} (15.29/sq mi)
  - Urban: 0%
  - Rural: 100%

Administrative structure
  - Inhabited localities: 19 rural localities

Municipal structure
  - Municipally incorporated as: Kochkovsky Municipal District
  - Municipal divisions: 0 urban settlements, 10 rural settlements
- Time zone: UTC+7 (MSK+4)
- OKTMO ID: 50625000
- Website: http://www.kochki.nso.ru/

Kochkovsky District (Russian: Кочковский райо́н) is an administrative and municipal district (raion), one of the thirty in Novosibirsk Oblast, Russia. It is located in the south of the oblast. The area of the district is 2,518 square kilometers (972 sq mi). Its administrative center is the rural locality (a selo) of Kochki. Population: 14,863 (2010 Census); 16,301 (2002 census); 16,745 (1989 Soviet census). The population of Kochki accounts for 27.3% of the district's total population.

== Notable residents ==
- Piotr Nazarov (1921–1988), painter and art teacher,

== Geography ==
River Karasuk is located in the district.
