= Kuznetsovka (Iglinsky District) =

Kuznetsovka Кузнецовка
- Village
- Location within Bashkortostan Location within Russia
- Coordinates: 54°38′N 56°37′E
- Country: Russia
- Region: Bashkortostan
- District: Iglinsky District
- Time zone: UTC+5:00

Kuznetsovka (Russian: Кузнецовка) is a rural locality (a village) in Kaltovsky Selsoviet, Iglinsky District, Bashkortostan, Russia. The population was 58 as of 2010.

== Geography ==
Kuznetsovka is located 36 km southeast of Iglino (the district's administrative centre) where transportation is by road. Mamayevka is the nearest rural locality.
