= Bagan, Bagansky District, Novosibirsk Oblast =

Village in Novosibirsk Oblast, Russia

Bagan Баган
- Village
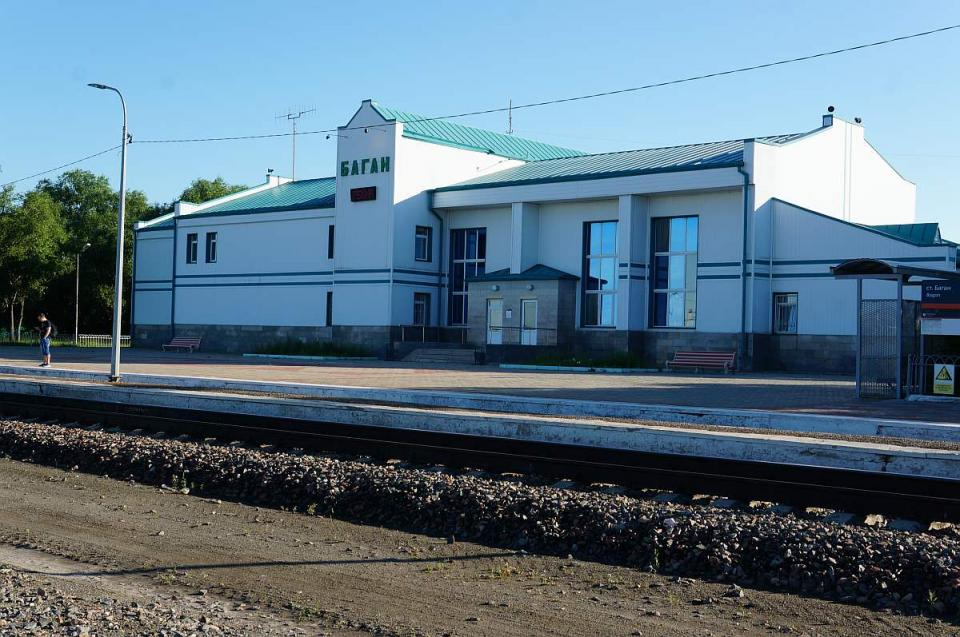
- Bagan railway station

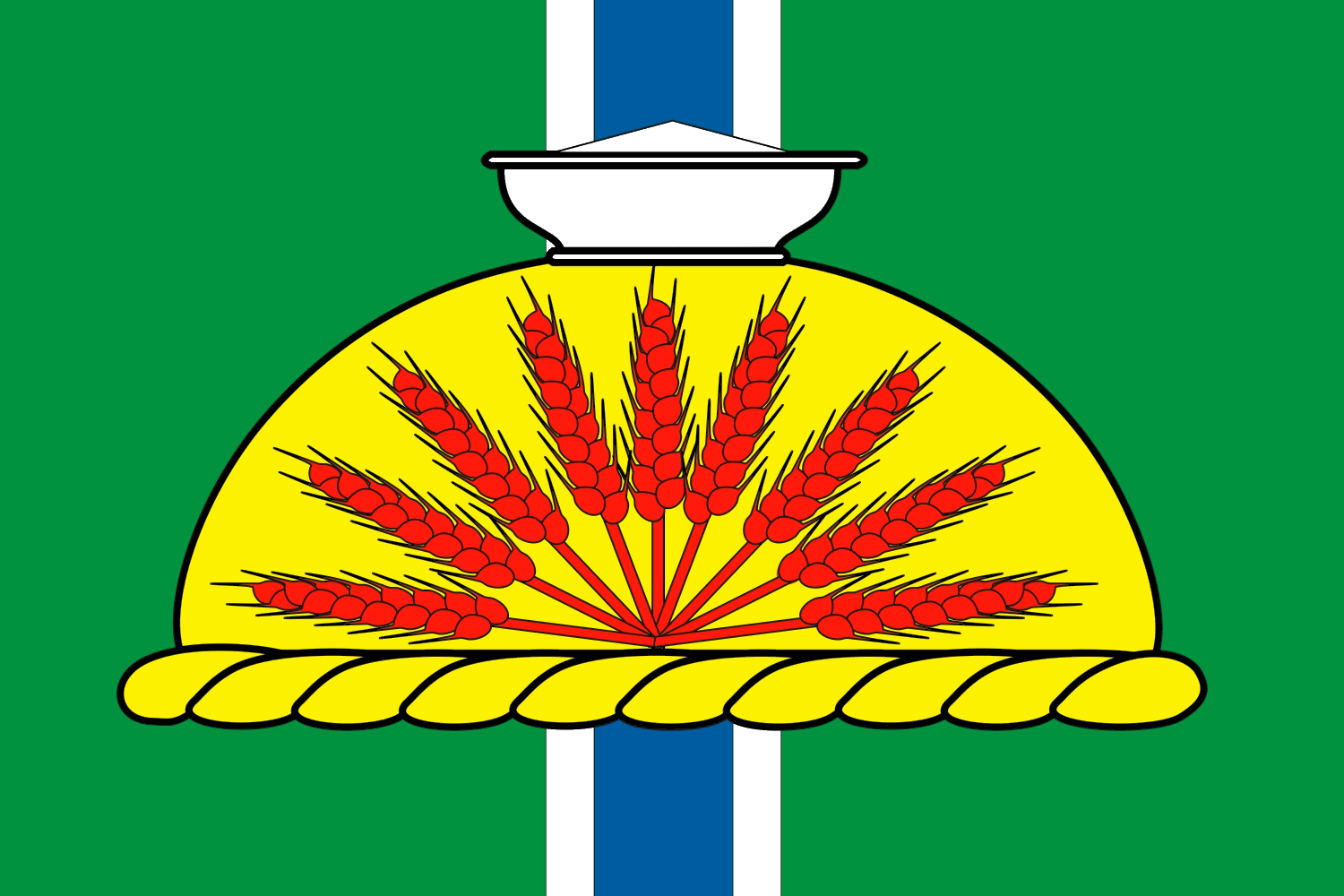
- Flag
- Interactive map of Bagan
- Coordinates: 54°05′52″N 77°40′19″E
- Country: Russia
- Region: Novosibirsk Oblast
- District: Bagansky District
- Village Council: Bagansky Village Council
- Established: 1914
- Postcode: 632770

Bagan (Russian: Баган) is a Village (selo) in Bagansky District, Novosibirsk Oblast, Russia. It is the administrative center of Bagansky District and Bagansky Village Council.

== History ==
Bagan was established in 1914 as a station of the railway running between Tatarsk and Slavgorod. It was the capital of the district from 1946 to 1963, and later again from 1965 onwards.

== Geography ==
Bagan lies in the Southern part of Baraba Plain, on the bank of the river with the same name. It is located 450 km (280 mi) southwest from Novosibirsk. Stretynka lies 5 km (3.1 mi) to the southeast and Tychkino 4 km (2.5 mi) to the east.
