= Kochki, Altai Krai =

Kochki Кочки
- Village
- Location within Altai Krai Location within Russia
- Coordinates: 52°23′N 80°39′E
- Country: Russia
- Region: Altai Krai
- District: Rodinsky District
- Time zone: UTC+7:00

Kochki (Russian: Кочки) is a rural locality (a selo) and the administrative center of Kochkinsky Selsoviet of Rodinsky District, Altai Krai, Russia. The population was 885 in 2016. There are 12 streets.

== Geography ==
Kochki is located 37 km southeast of Rodino (the district's administrative centre) by road. Zelyonaya Dubrava is the nearest rural locality.
