= Mochan (lake) =

Salt lake in Russia

- Мочан
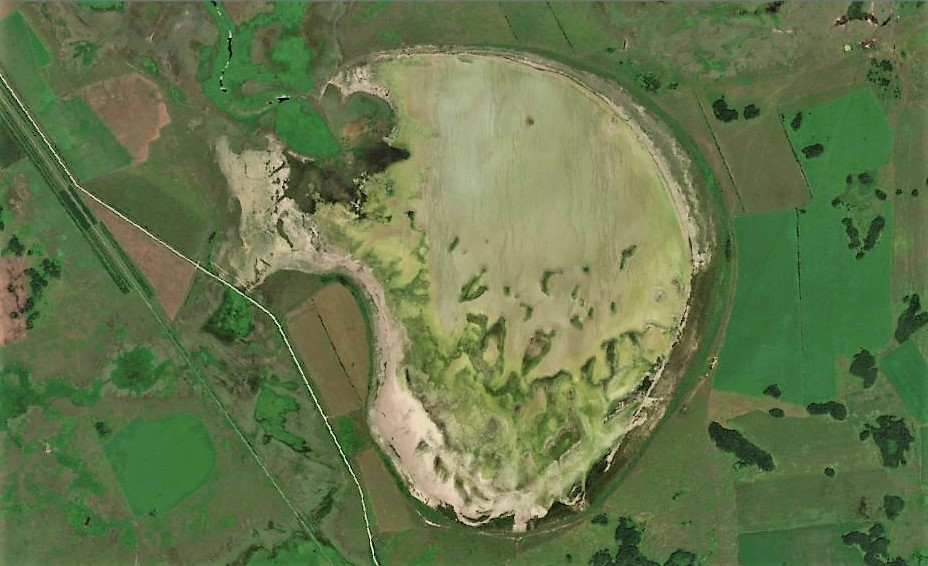
- Sentinel-2 picture of the lake after the spring floods

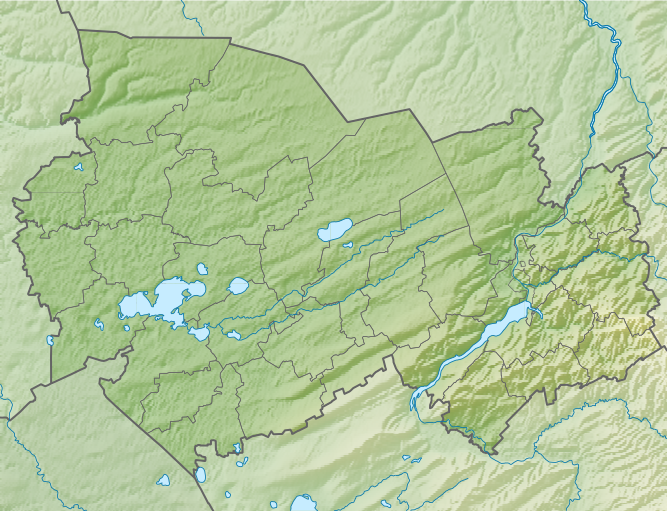
- Location within Novosibirsk Oblast Location within Russia
- Location: Baraba Lowland; West Siberian Plain
- Coordinates: 53°59′02″N 77°51′54″E
- Type: fluvial lake
- Basin countries: Russia
- Max. length: 5.6 kilometers (3.5 mi)
- Max. width: 3.8 kilometers (2.4 mi)
- Surface area: 17.1 square kilometers (6.6 sq mi)
- Residence time: UTC+7
- Surface elevation: 103 meters (338 ft)

Mochan (Russian: Мочан) is a salt lake in Bagansky District, Novosibirsk Oblast, Russian Federation.

The lake is located at the southwestern end of the Oblast. The nearest inhabited places are Savkino 6 kilometers (3.7 mi) to the southeast, Stretynka 7 kilometers (4.3 mi) to the northwest and Voskresenka 8 kilometers (5.0 mi) to the southwest. Bagan, the district capital, lies 15 kilometers (9.3 mi) to the northwest of the northern lakeshore.

== Geography ==
Mochan lies in the Baraba Lowland, West Siberian Plain. It is part of the Bagan river basin. The lake is very shallow and has an angelfish shape, stretching from north to south for over 5 kilometers (3.1 mi). At the northern end there is a 3 kilometers (1.9 mi) long channel connecting the lake with the Bagan to the north. During spring floods Mochan fills with river water, but it is so shallow that it dries out before the summer, becoming a salt marsh.

== Flora and fauna ==
By mid summer the surface of the lake bottom hardens and in the southern part there are islets where thickets of halophyte plants grow, some of which display a striking purple coloration.

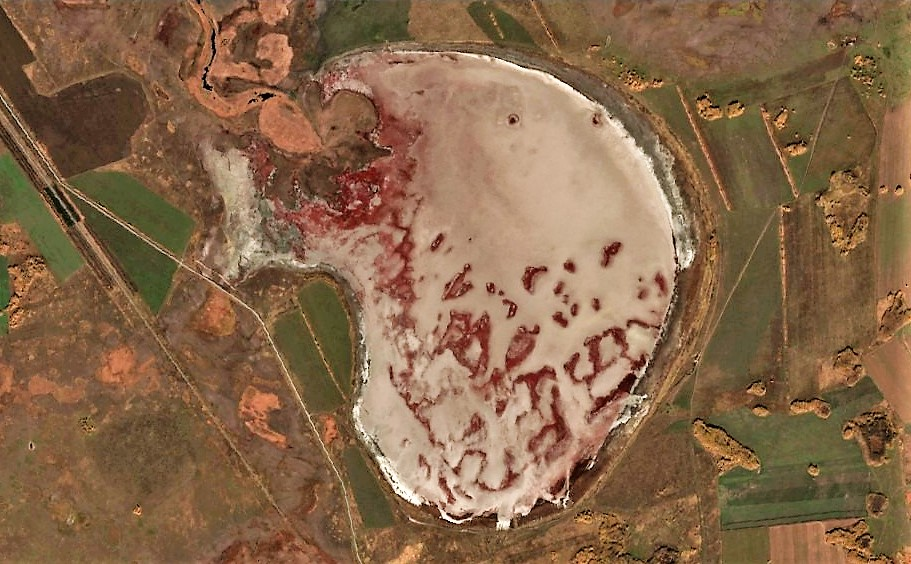
Mochan in the late dry season with purple vegetation.

== See also ==
- List of lakes of Russia
