= Alexandro-Nevsky, Ryazan Oblast =

Alexandro-Nevsky Александро-Невский
- Work settlement
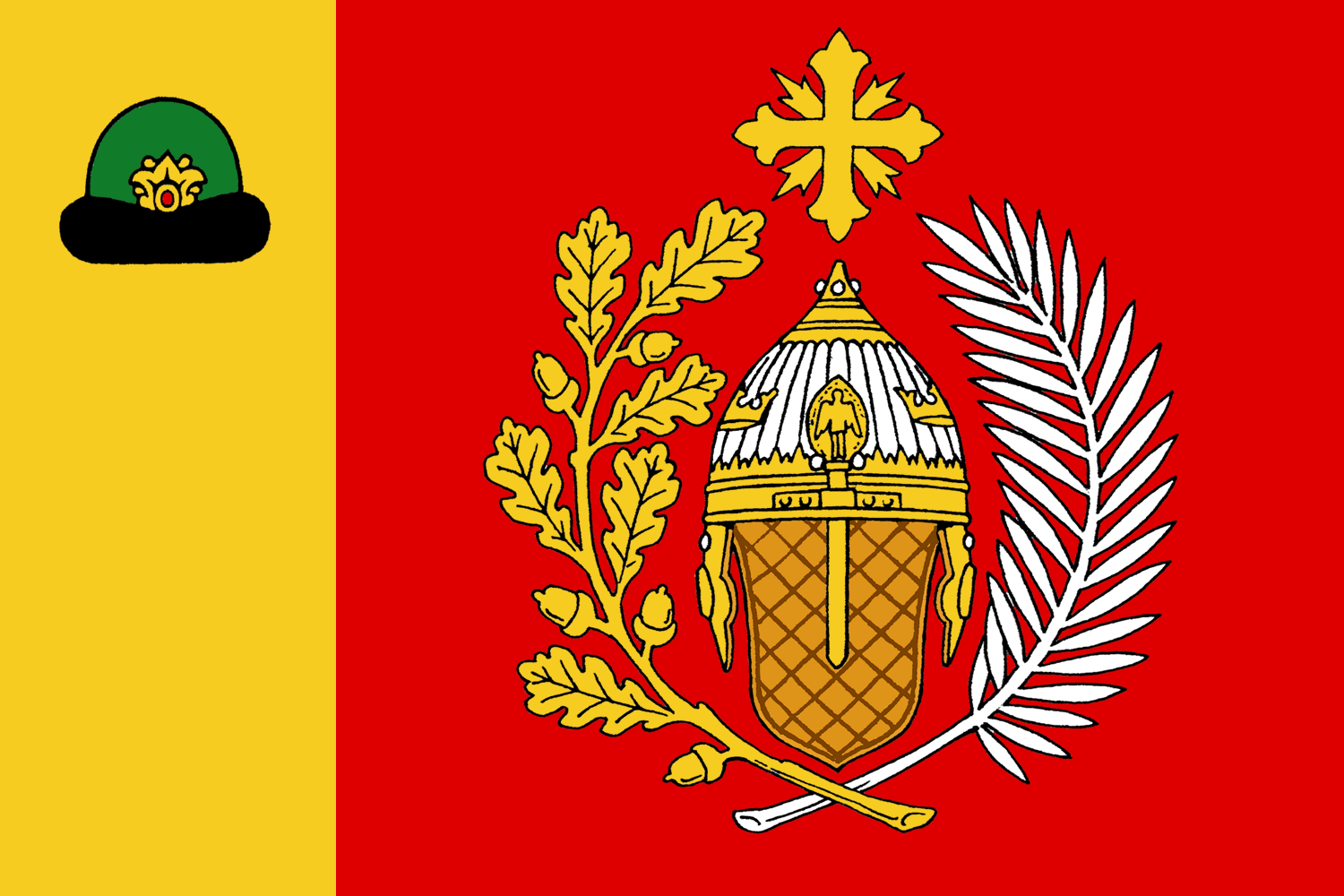
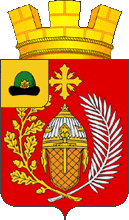
- Flag Coat of arms
- Interactive map of Alexandro-Nevsky
- Location of Alexandro-Nevsky Alexandro-Nevsky (Ryazan Oblast)
- Coordinates: 53°28′43″N 40°12′43″E
- Country: Russia
- Federal subject: Ryazan Oblast
- Administrative district: Alexandro-Nevsky District
- Elevation: 147 m (482 ft)

Population (2010 Census)
  - Total: 4,013
  - Estimate (2023): 3,605 (−10.2%)

Administrative status
  - Capital of: Alexandro-Nevsky District

Municipal status
  - Municipal district: Alexandro-Nevsky Municipal District
  - Urban settlement: Alexandro-Nevskoye Urban Settlement
  - Capital of: Alexandro-Nevsky Municipal District, Alexandro-Nevskoye Urban Settlement
- Time zone: UTC+3 (MSK)
- Postal code: 391240
- OKTMO ID: 61620151051

Alexandro-Nevsky (Russian: Алекса́ндро-Не́вский) is an urban locality (work settlement) and the administrative center of Alexandro-Nevsky District of Ryazan Oblast, Russia. Population: 4,013 (2010 census); 4,133 (2002 census); 4,447 (1989 Soviet census).
