= Savkino (Novosibirsk Oblast) =

Village in Novosibirsk Oblast, Russia

Savkino Савкино
- Village
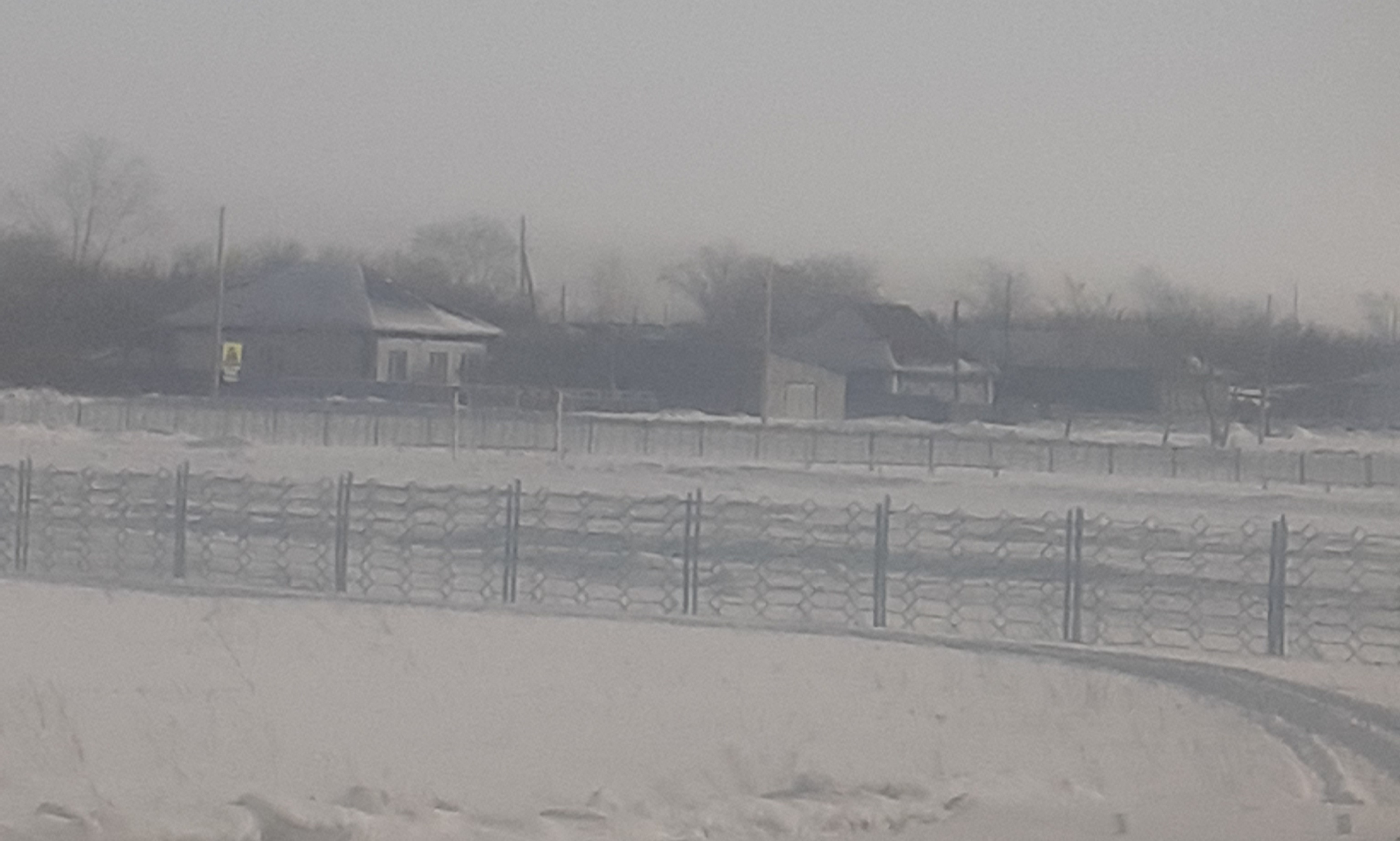
- Savkino in February

- Location within Novosibirsk Oblast Location within Russia
- Coordinates: 53°54′04″N 77°54′24″E
- Country: Russia
- Region: Novosibirsk Oblast
- District: Bagansky District
- Village Council: Savkinsky Village Council
- Time zone: UTC+7:00
- Postcode: 632780

Savkino (Russian: Савкино) is a rural locality (a selo). It is the administrative center of the Savkinsky Village Council of Bagansky District, Novosibirsk Oblast, Russia. Population: 919 (2010 census); 959 (2002 census);

== Geography ==
Savkino lies in the southern part of Baraba Plain. Voskresenka is located 9 km (5.6 mi) to the west and Kuznetsovka 22 km (14 mi) in the same direction. Lake Mochan lies 6 km (3.7 mi) to the northwest.
