= Savkino, Gryazovetsky District, Vologda Oblast =

Savkino Савкино
- Village
- Location within Vologda Oblast Location within Russia
- Coordinates: 58°58′N 40°00′E
- Country: Russia
- Region: Vologda Oblast
- District: Gryazovetsky District
- Time zone: UTC+3:00

Savkino (Russian: Савкино) is a rural locality (a village) in Yurovskoye Rural Settlement, Gryazovetsky District, Vologda Oblast, Russia. The population was 16 as of 2002.

== Geography ==
Savkino is located 21 km northwest of Gryazovets (the district's administrative centre) by road. Mokeyevo is the nearest rural locality.
