= Savkino (Bashkortostan) =

Savkino Савкино
- Village
- Location within Bashkortostan Location within Russia
- Coordinates: 54°13′N 53°57′E
- Country: Russia
- Region: Bashkortostan
- District: Belebeyevsky District
- Time zone: UTC+5:00

Savkino (Russian: Савкино) is a rural locality (a village) in Yermolkinsky Selsoviet, Belebeyevsky District, Bashkortostan, Russia. The population was 57 as of 2010. There are 4 streets.

== Geography ==
Savkino is located 28 km northwest of Belebey (the district's administrative centre) by road. Verkhneyermolgi is the nearest rural locality.
