= Kochki, Belgorod Oblast =

Kochki Кочки
- Khutor
- Location within Belgorod Oblast Location within Russia
- Coordinates: 51°00′N 37°13′E
- Country: Russia
- Region: Belgorod Oblast
- District: Gubkinsky District
- Time zone: UTC+3:00

Kochki (Russian: Кочки) is a rural locality (a khutor) in Gubkinsky District, Belgorod Oblast, Russia. The population was 90 as of 2010. There are 2 streets.

== Geography ==
Kochki is located 47 km southwest of Gubkin (the district's administrative centre) by road. Tolstoye is the nearest rural locality.
