= Alexandro-Nevskoye, Republic of Dagestan =

Alexandro-Nevskoye Александро-Невское Сасаплы
- Selo
- Location within Republic of Dagestan Location within Russia
- Coordinates: 43°55′N 46°33′E
- Country: Russia
- Region: Republic of Dagestan
- District: Tarumovsky District
- Time zone: UTC+3:00

Alexandro-Nevskoye (Russian: Александро-Невское; Nogai: Сасаплы, Sasaplı) is a rural locality (a selo) in Tarumovsky District, Republic of Dagestan, Russia. Population: 1,626 (2021 census); 1,311 (2002 census); 1,091 (1989 Soviet census). There are 28 streets.

== Geography ==
Alexandro-Nevskoye is located 25 km south of Tarumovka (the district's administrative centre) by road. Novokrestyanovskoye is the nearest rural locality.
