= Kochki, Novosibirsk Oblast =

Rural locality in Novosibirsk Oblast, Russia

Kochki Кочки
- Village
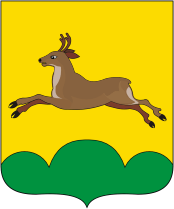
- Seal

- Location within Novosibirsk Oblast Location within Russia
- Coordinates: 54°19′53″N 80°29′16″E
- Country: Russia
- Region: Novosibirsk Oblast
- District: Kochkovsky District
- Time zone: UTC+7:00
- Postcode: 632901

Kochki (Russian: Кочки) is a rural locality (a selo) and the administrative center of Kochkovsky District, Novosibirsk Oblast, Russia. Population: 4,055 (2010 census); 4,154 (2002 census); 4,363 (1989 Soviet census).

== Geography ==
Kochki lies in the southern part of the Baraba Plain, close to the banks of the Karasuk. On the other side of the river is the village of Krasnaya Sibir. Novosibirsk, the regional capital, lies roughly 212 kilometers (132 mi) to the northeast.
