= Karasuk, Altai Republic =

Karasuk Карасук
- Village
- Location within Altai Republic Location within Russia
- Coordinates: 51°51′N 86°08′E
- Country: Russia
- Region: Altai Republic
- District: Mayminsky District
- Time zone: UTC+7:00

Karasuk (Russian: Карасук; Altay: Кара-Суу, Kara-Suu) is a rural locality (a selo) in Kyzyl-Ozyokskoye Rural Settlement of Mayminsky District, the Altai Republic, Russia. The population was 331 as of 2016. There are 4 streets.

== Geography ==
Karasuk is located on the Katun River, 33 km southeast of Mayma (the district's administrative centre) by road. Kyzyl-Ozyok is the nearest rural locality.
