= Alexandro-Nevsky District =

Alexandro-Nevsky District Александро-Невский район (Russian)
- District
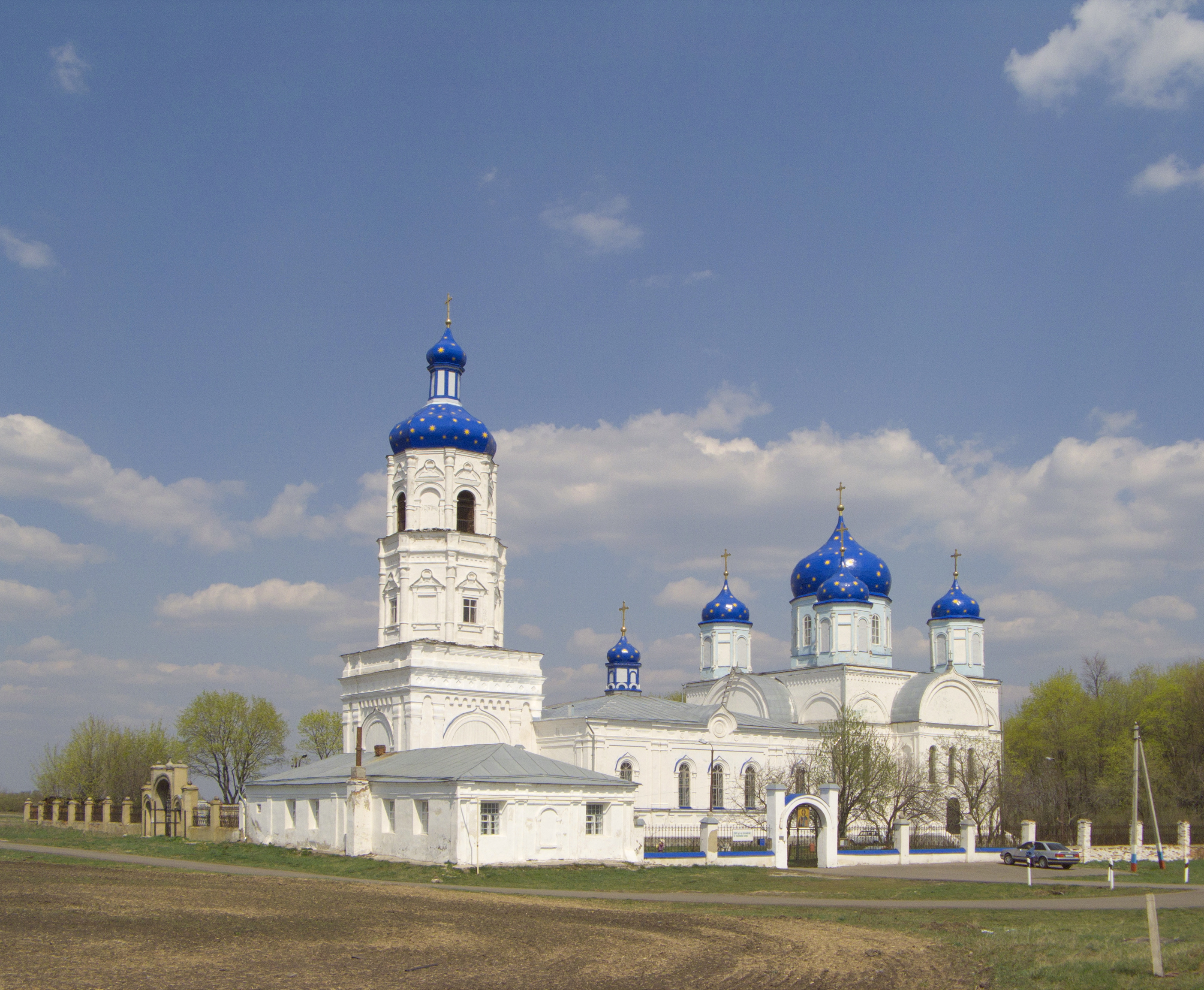
- Church of the Theotokos of Bogolyubovo (Zimarovo), Alexandro-Nevsky District

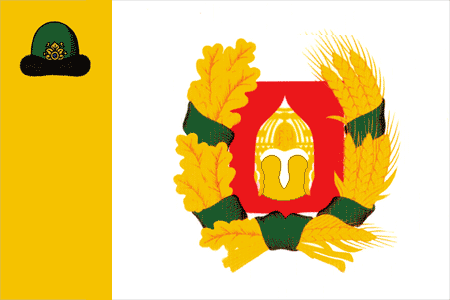
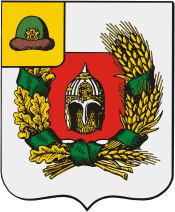
- Flag Coat of arms
- Location of Alexandro-Nevsky District in Ryazan Oblast
- Coordinates: 53°28′N 40°12′E
- Country: Russia
- Federal subject: Ryazan Oblast
- Administrative center: Alexandro-Nevsky

Area
  - Total: 833 km^{2} (322 sq mi)

Population (2010 Census)
  - Total: 11,818
  - Density: 14.2/km^{2} (36.7/sq mi)
  - Urban: 34.0%
  - Rural: 66.0%

Administrative structure
  - Administrative divisions: 1 Work settlements, 14 Rural okrugs
  - Inhabited localities: 1 urban-type settlements, 75 rural localities

Municipal structure
  - Municipally incorporated as: Alexandro-Nevsky Municipal District
  - Municipal divisions: 1 urban settlements, 7 rural settlements
- Time zone: UTC+3 (MSK)
- OKTMO ID: 61620000
- Website: http://al-nevsk.ru/

Alexandro-Nevsky District (Russian: Алекса́ндро-Не́вский райо́н) is an administrative and municipal district (raion), one of the 25 in Ryazan Oblast, Russia. It is located in the south of the oblast. The area of the district is 833 square kilometers (322 sq mi). Its administrative center is the urban locality (a work settlement) of Alexandro-Nevsky. Population: 11,818 (2010 Census); 13,071 (2002 census); 13,547 (1989 Soviet census). The population of the administrative center accounts for 34.0% of the district's total population.

== History ==
Until June 18, 2012, the district was called Novoderevensky (Новодеревенский).

== Notable residents ==
- Sergey Bizyukin (born 1982), activist, journalist and historian
- Fyodor Shebanov (1921–1951), Soviet flying ace during the Korean War, born in the village of Studenki
