= Karasuk (river) =

River in Siberia, Russia

Karasuk Карасук
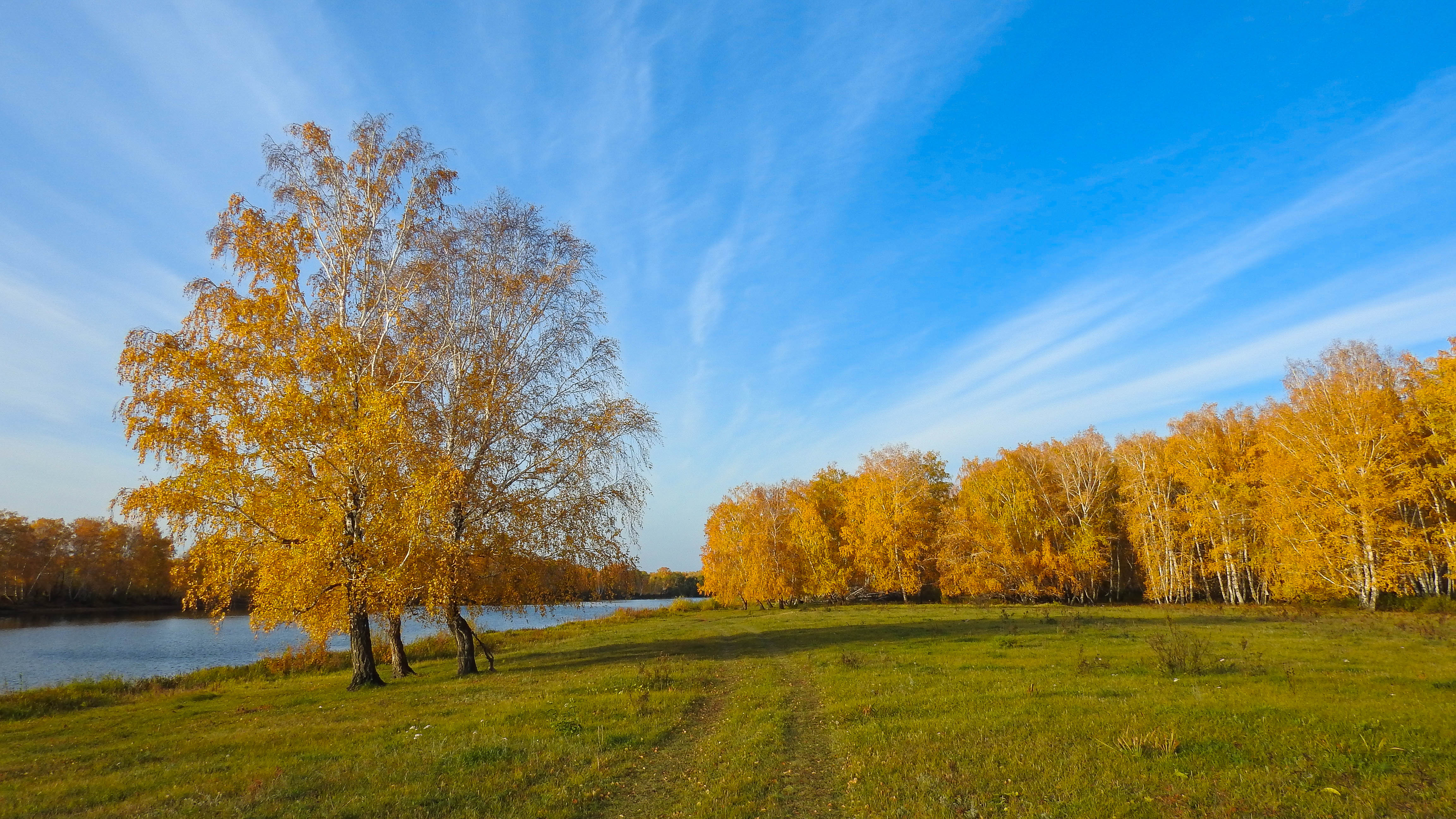
- Lake Kornoukhovo, an oxbow lake of the Karasuk basin near Loktyonok

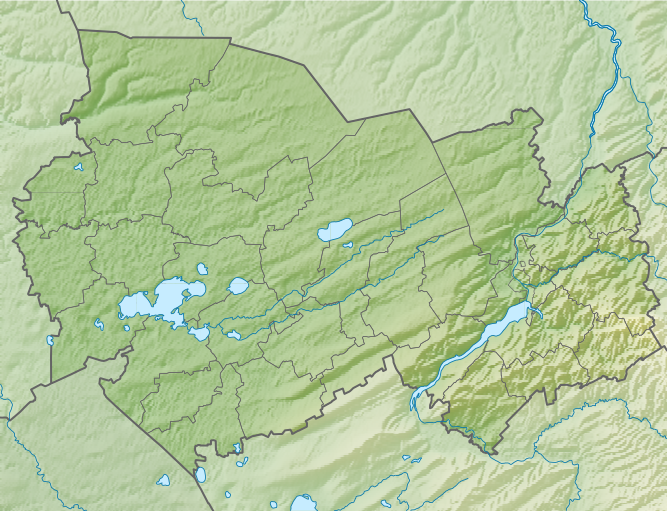
- Mouth location in Novosibirsk Oblast, Russia

Location
- Countries: Russia

Physical characteristics
- Source: Ob Plateau
  - coordinates: 54°40′26″N 81°47′11″E
  - elevation: 190 metres (620 ft)
- Mouth
  - coordinates: 53°35′09″N 77°32′30″E
  - elevation: 105 metres (344 ft)
- Length: 531 km (330 mi)
- Basin size: 11,300 km^{2} (4,400 sq mi)

The Karasuk (Russian: Карасук) is a river in the Karasuksky, Krasnozyorsky, Kochkovsky and Chulymsky districts, Novosibirsk Oblast, Russia. It is 531 kilometres (330 mi) long, with a drainage basin of 11,300 square kilometres (4,400 mi^{2}).

The source region of the Karasuk River was declared a special protected area on 26 March 2007.

== Course ==
The Karasuk begins some 100 kilometres (62 mi) southwest of Novosibirsk, at 190 metres (620 ft) above sea level. It flows in a southwesterly direction through a wide valley in the southern part of the Baraba Steppe ending in the eastern shore of lake Studyonoye at 105 metres (344 ft). The lake is part of an endorheic basin of small lakes and swamps near the Russia-Kazakhstan border. At high water levels some water will flow through the Chuman (Чуман) River to the Burla (Бурла), which branches from the main river towards the south, east of the town of Karasuk. Some water may also branch off towards the north at Nizhnecheremoshnoye, via the Baganyonok (Russian: Баганёнок) tributary, to the Bagan River. There are riverine lakes in its basin, such as Astrodym.

At the river's lower reaches lies the town and railway hub of Karasuk, named after the river. Other inhabited places near the banks of the Karasuk include Kochki, Krasnaya Sibir, Chernovka, Reshety, Bukreyevo Pleso, Chernaki, Mayskoye, Mokhnaty Log, Gerbayevo, Krasnozyorskoye, Novy Baganyonok, Kaigorodsky and Studyonoye.

== See also ==
- List of rivers of Russia
