= Krasnozyorskoye =

Krasnozyorskoye Краснозёрское
- Urban-type settlement
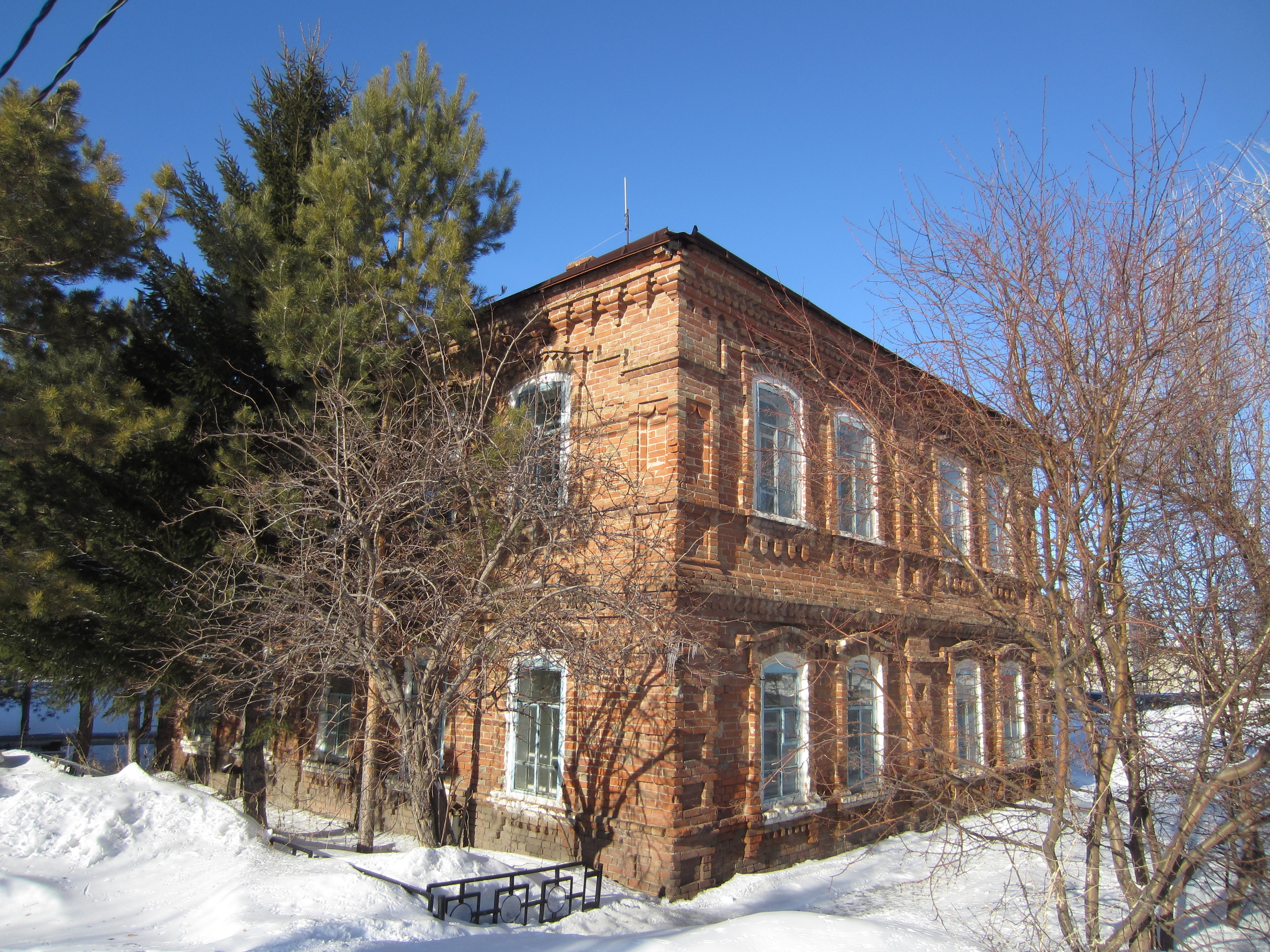
- Singer Company building
- Interactive map of Krasnozyorskoye
- Location of Krasnozyorskoye Krasnozyorskoye (Novosibirsk Oblast)
- Coordinates: 53.9833°N 79.2323°E
- Country: Russia
- Federal subject: Novosibirsk Oblast
- Administrative district: Krasnozyorsky District
- Founded: 1773
- Elevation: 151 m (495 ft)

Population (2010 Census)
  - Total: 9,524
  - Estimate (2025): 8,838 (−7.2%)
- Time zone: UTC+7 (MSK+4)
- Postal code: 632902
- OKTMO ID: 50627151051

Krasnozyorskoye (Russian: Краснозёрское) is an urban locality (an urban-type settlement) in Krasnozyorsky District of Novosibirsk Oblast, Russia. Population: 9,524 (2010 census); 10,473 (2002 census); 9,954 (1989 Soviet census).

== Geography ==
Krasnozyorskoye lies in the southern part of the Baraba Plain by the banks of the Karasuk River. Kaigorodsky village lies close to its western side and Krasny Khutor 1.5 kilometers (0.93 mi) to the southeast.

== Notable residents ==
- Aleksandr Laktionov (born 28 May 1986), football player and coach
