= Karasuksky District =

Karasuksky District Карасукский район (Russian)
- District
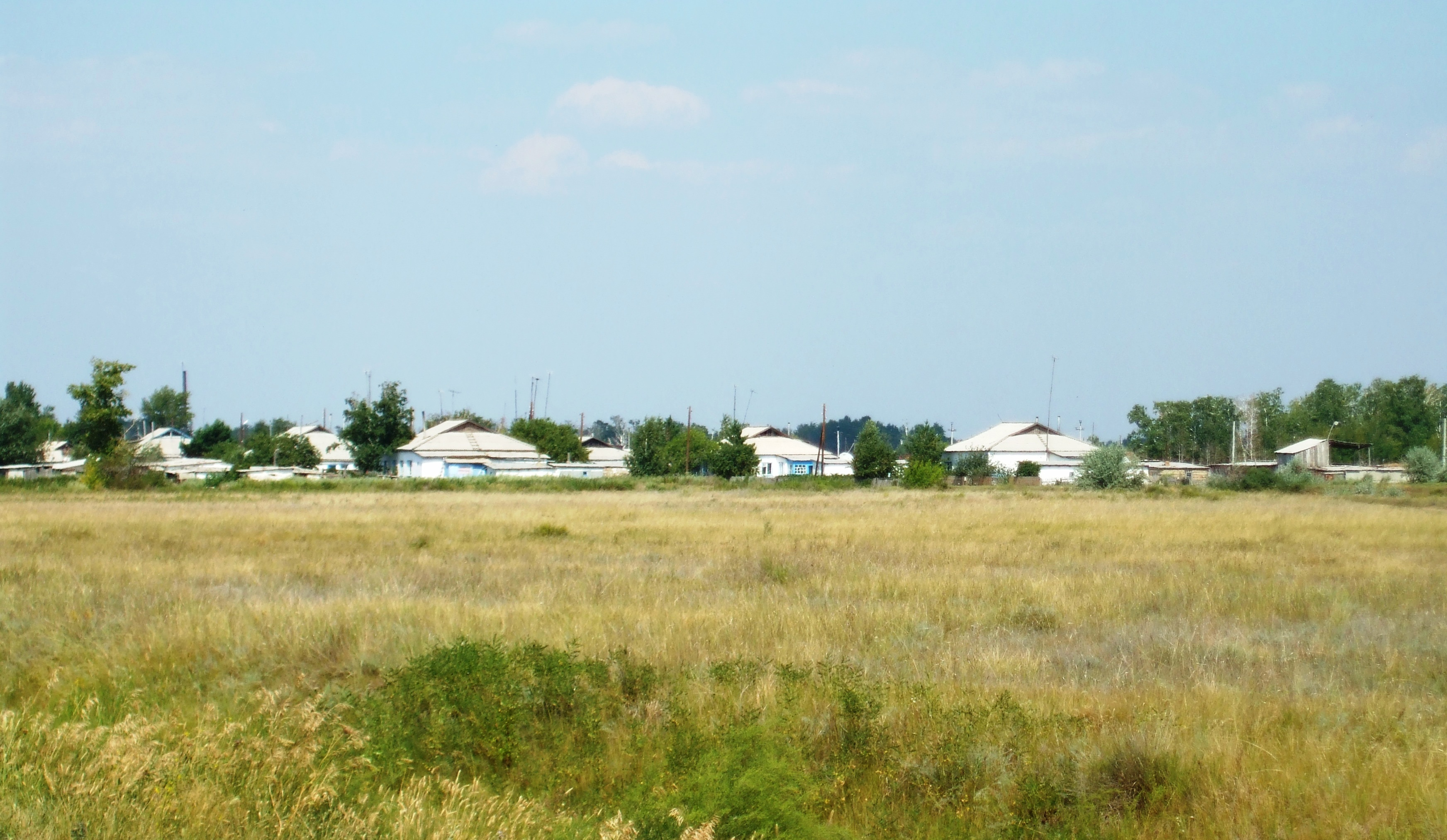
- Novoivanovka, Karasuksky District

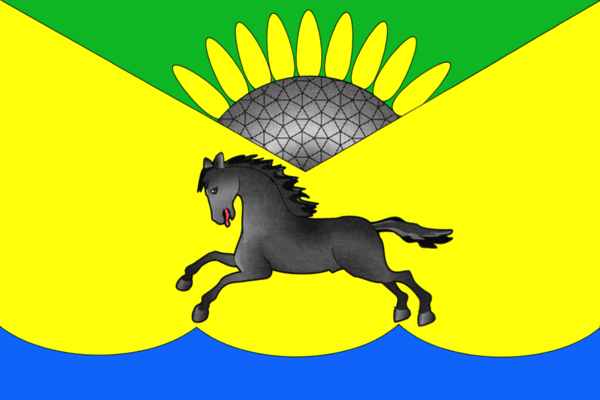
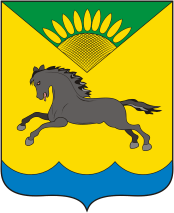
- Flag Coat of arms
- Location of Karasuksky District in Novosibirsk Oblast
- Coordinates: 53°44′N 78°02′E
- Country: Russia
- Federal subject: Novosibirsk Oblast
- Established: 1925
- Administrative center: Karasuk

Area
  - Total: 4,321 km^{2} (1,668 sq mi)

Population (2010 Census)
  - Total: 46,262
  - Density: 10.71/km^{2} (27.73/sq mi)
  - Urban: 61.8%
  - Rural: 38.2%

Administrative structure
  - Inhabited localities: 1 cities/towns, 57 rural localities

Municipal structure
  - Municipally incorporated as: Karasuksky Municipal District
  - Municipal divisions: 1 urban settlements, 11 rural settlements
- Time zone: UTC+7 (MSK+4)
- OKTMO ID: 50617000
- Website: http://www.adm-karasuk.ru/

Karasuksky District (Russian: Карасу́кский райо́н; Kazakh: Қарасуық ауданы, Qarasuyq audany) is an administrative and municipal district (raion), one of the thirty in Novosibirsk Oblast, Russia. It is located in the southwest of the oblast. The area of the district is 4,321 square kilometers (1,668 sq mi). Its administrative center is the town of Karasuk. Population: 46,262 (2010 Census); 48,548 (2002 census); 50,374 (1989 Soviet census). The population of Karasuk accounts for 61.8% of the district's total population.

== Geography ==
Rivers Baganyonok and Karasuk, as well as lakes Astrodym and Studyonoye, are located in the district. Lake Chagan straddles the Kazakhstan–Russia border.
