= Krasnozyorsky District =

Krasnozyorsky District Краснозёрский район (Russian)
- District
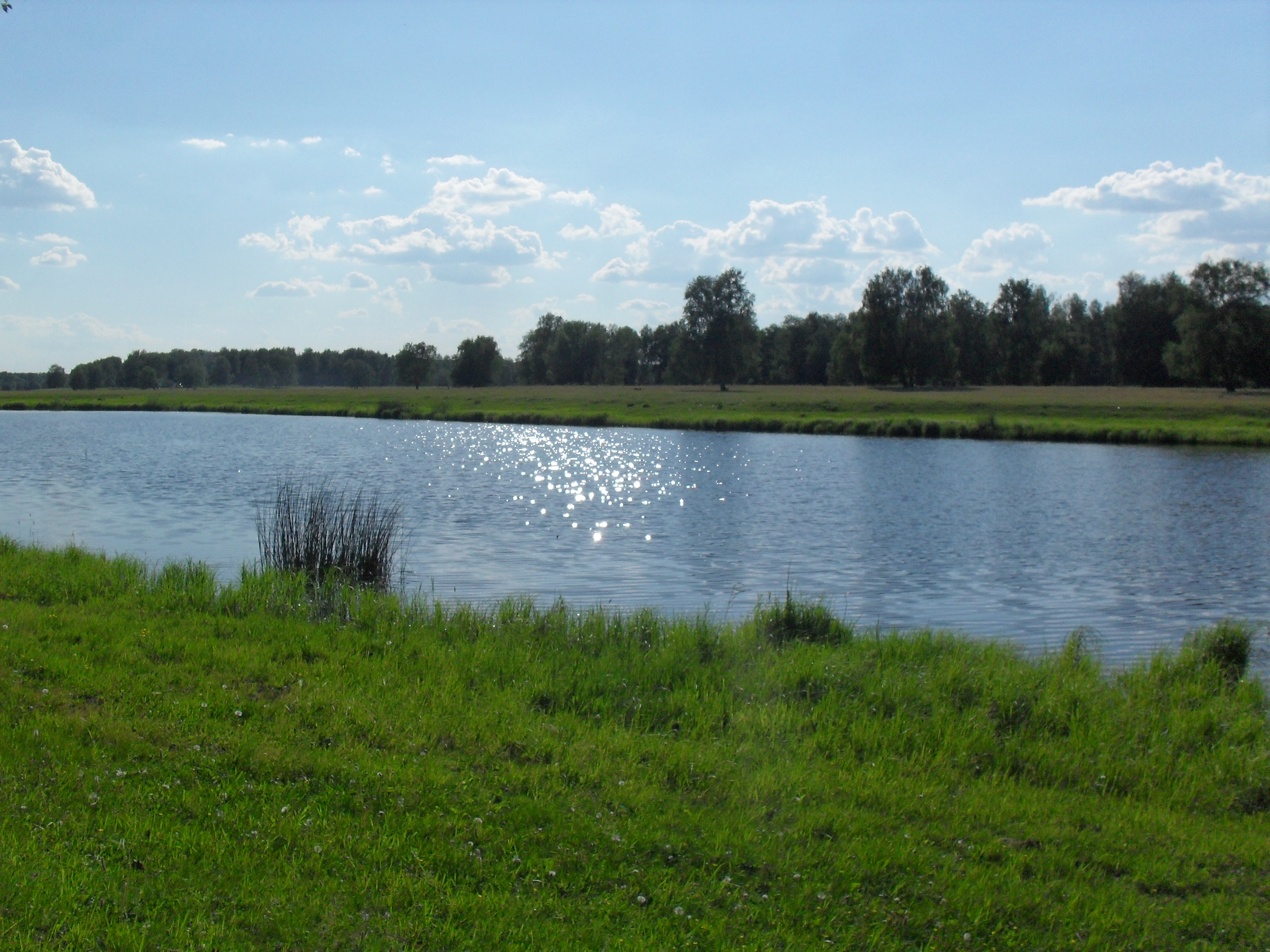
- Baganyonok River, Krasnozyorsky District

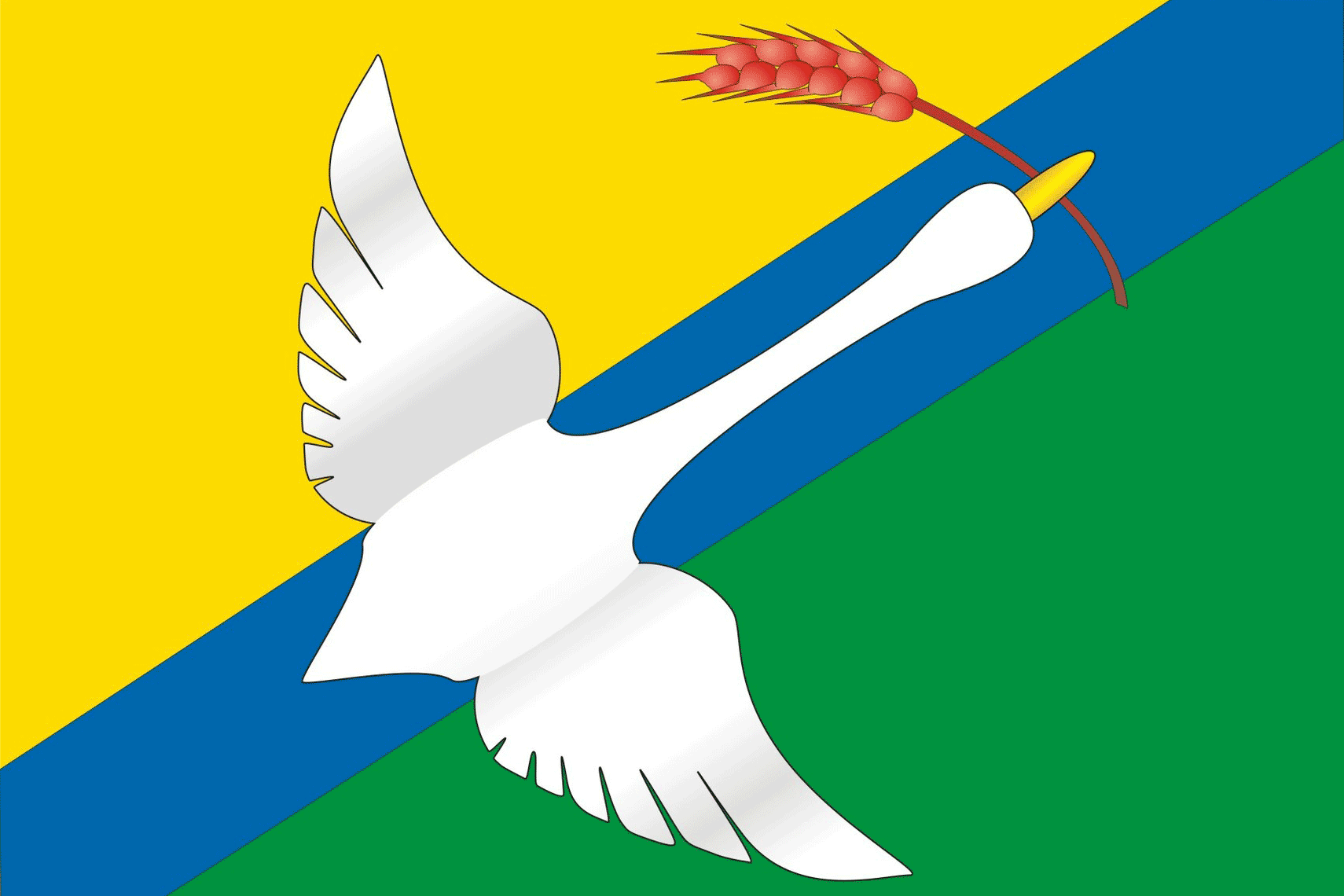
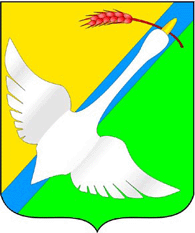
- Flag Coat of arms
- Location of Krasnozyorsky District in Novosibirsk Oblast
- Coordinates: 53°59′N 79°15′E
- Country: Russia
- Federal subject: Novosibirsk Oblast
- Established: 1925
- Administrative center: Krasnozyorskoye

Area
  - Total: 5,330 km^{2} (2,060 sq mi)

Population (2010 Census)
  - Total: 32,491
  - Density: 6.10/km^{2} (15.8/sq mi)
  - Urban: 29.3%
  - Rural: 70.7%

Administrative structure
  - Inhabited localities: 1 urban-type settlements, 48 rural localities

Municipal structure
  - Municipally incorporated as: Krasnozyorsky Municipal District
  - Municipal divisions: 1 urban settlements, 18 rural settlements
- Time zone: UTC+7 (MSK+4)
- OKTMO ID: 50627000
- Website: http://www.krasnozerskoe.nso.ru/

Krasnozyorsky District (Russian: Краснозёрский райо́н) is an administrative and municipal district (raion), one of the thirty in Novosibirsk Oblast, Russia. It is located in the south of the oblast. The area of the district is 5,330 square kilometers (2,060 sq mi). Its administrative center is the urban locality (a work settlement) of Krasnozyorskoye. Population: 32,491 (2010 Census); 38,836 (2002 census); 40,312 (1989 Soviet census). The population of Krasnozyorskoye accounts for 29.3% of the district's total population.

== Geography ==
Rivers Baganyonok and Karasuk are located in the district.
