= Karasuk, Novosibirsk Oblast =

Town in Novosibirsk Oblast, Russia

Karasuk Карасук
- Town
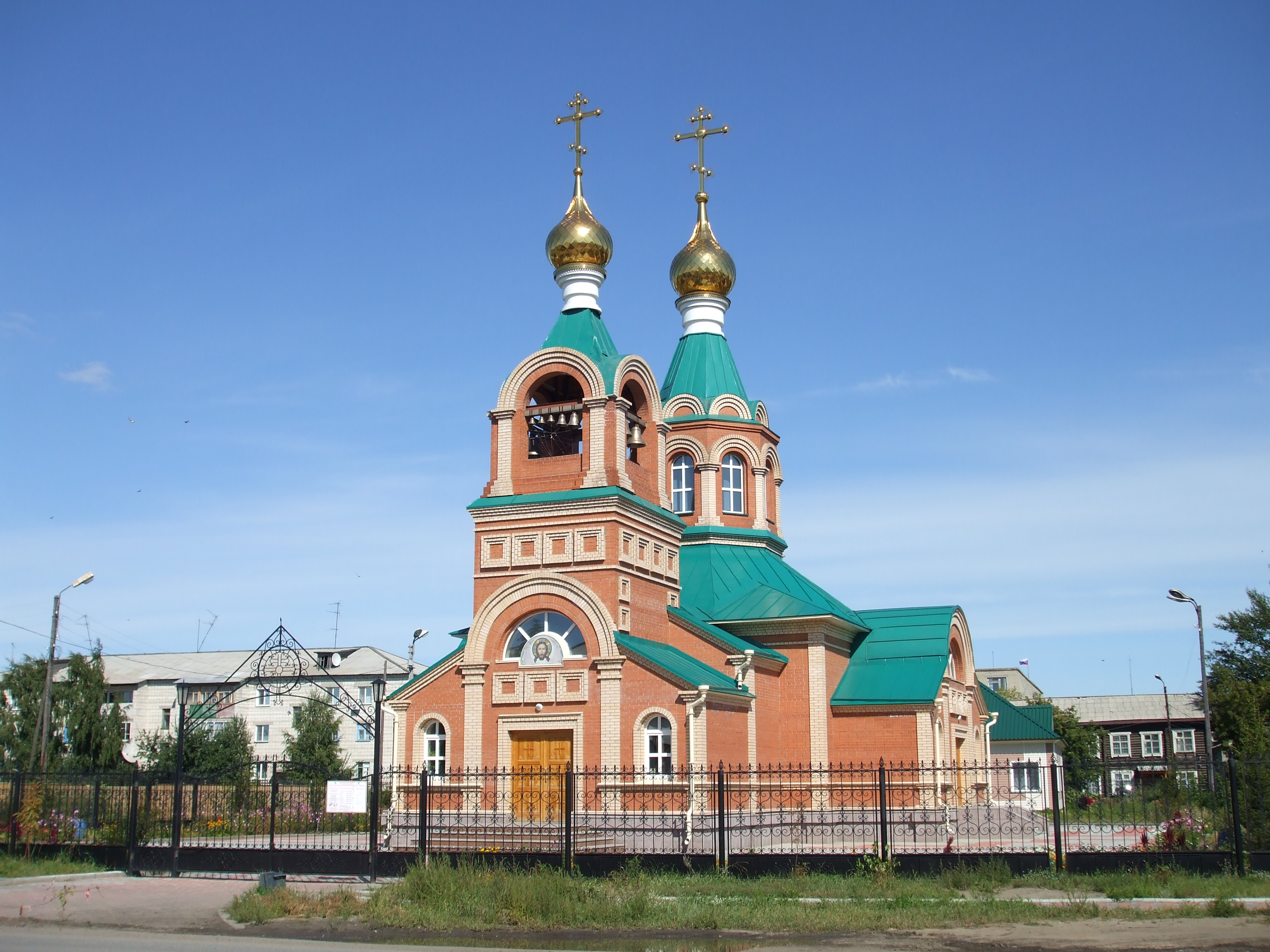

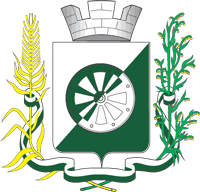
- Flag Coat of arms
- Interactive map of Karasuk
- Location of Karasuk Karasuk (Novosibirsk Oblast)
- Coordinates: 53°43′N 78°03′E
- Country: Russia
- Federal subject: Novosibirsk Oblast
- Administrative district: Karasuksky District
- TownSelsoviet: Karasuk
- Founded: late 18th century
- Town status since: 1954
- Elevation: 110 m (360 ft)

Population (2010 Census)
  - Total: 28,586
  - Estimate (2021): 24,890 (−12.9%)

Administrative status
  - Capital of: Karasuksky District, Town of Karasuk

Municipal status
  - Municipal district: Karasuksky Municipal District
  - Urban settlement: Karasuk Urban Settlement
  - Capital of: Karasuksky Municipal District, Karasuk Urban Settlement
- Time zone: UTC+7 (MSK+4)
- Postal code: 632860–632868
- OKTMO ID: 50617101001

Karasuk (Russian: Карасу́к; Kazakh: Қарасуық, Qarasuyq) is a town and the administrative center of Karasuksky District in Novosibirsk Oblast, Russia, located on the Karasuk River 678 kilometers (421 mi) west of Novosibirsk, the administrative center of the oblast. Population: 28,586 (2010 census); 28,734 (2002 census); 29,401 (1989 Soviet census).

== History ==
It was founded in the late 18th century and was granted town status in 1954.

== Administrative and municipal status ==
Within the framework of administrative divisions, Karasuk serves as the administrative center of Karasuksky District. As an administrative division, it is, together with the settlement of Yarok, incorporated within Karasuksky District as the Town of Karasuk. As a municipal division, the Town of Karasuk is incorporated within Karasuksky Municipal District as Karasuk Urban Settlement.

== Notable people ==
- Sergey Zhunenko (born 1970 in Karasuk), former Kazakhstani footballer
