= Bagansky District =

Bagansky District Баганский район (Russian)
- District
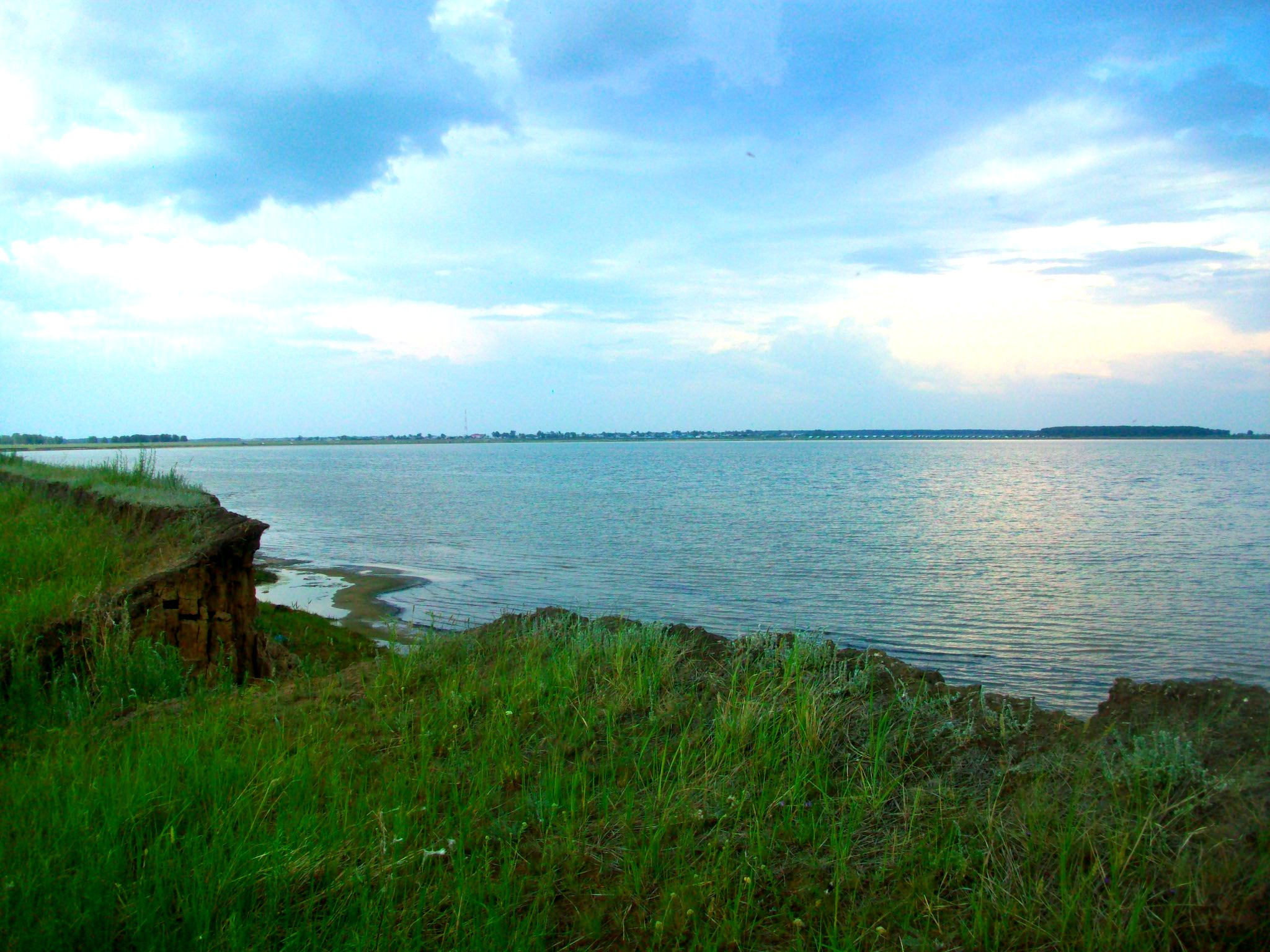
- Bitter Lake, Bagansky District

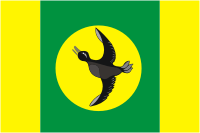
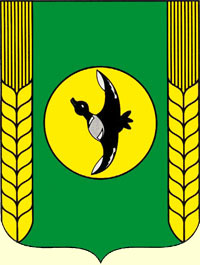
- Flag Coat of arms
- Location of Bagansky District in Novosibirsk Oblast
- Coordinates: 54°06′N 77°40′E
- Country: Russia
- Federal subject: Novosibirsk Oblast
- Established: 1965
- Administrative center: Bagan

Area
  - Total: 3,367.73 km^{2} (1,300.29 sq mi)

Population (2010 Census)
  - Total: 16,627
  - Density: 4.9372/km^{2} (12.787/sq mi)
  - Urban: 0%
  - Rural: 100%

Administrative structure
  - Inhabited localities: 41 rural localities

Municipal structure
  - Municipally incorporated as: Bagansky Municipal District
  - Municipal divisions: 0 urban settlements, 9 rural settlements
- Time zone: UTC+7 (MSK+4)
- OKTMO ID: 50603000
- Website: http://bagan.nso.ru/

Bagansky District (Russian: Бага́нский райо́н) is an administrative and municipal district (raion), one of the thirty in Novosibirsk Oblast, Russia. It is located in the southwest of the oblast. The area of the district is 3,367.73 square kilometers (1,300.29 sq mi). Its administrative center is the rural locality (a selo) of Bagan. Population: 16,627 (2010 Census); 18,457 (2002 census); 18,922 (1989 Soviet census). The population of Bagan accounts for 33.1% of the district's total population.

== Geography ==
River Baganyonok and lakes Gorkoye and Mochan are located in the district.
