= Yudino =

Yudino or Yudinsky may refer to:

- Yudino, Gryazovetsky District, Vologda Oblast
- Yudino (Novosibirsk Oblast)
- Yudino, Ozyorsky District
- Yudino (Velikoustyugsky District)
- Yudino, Voronezh Oblast
- Yudinsky District, Novosibirsk Oblast, former name of Chistoozyorny District
- Yudinsky District, Republic of Tatarstan, former name of Zelenodolsky District
- Yudinsky Reach, name of the western part of Lake Chany

== See also ==
- Yudin
