= Kopkul =

Village in Novosibirsk Oblast, Russia

Kopkul Копкуль
- Village
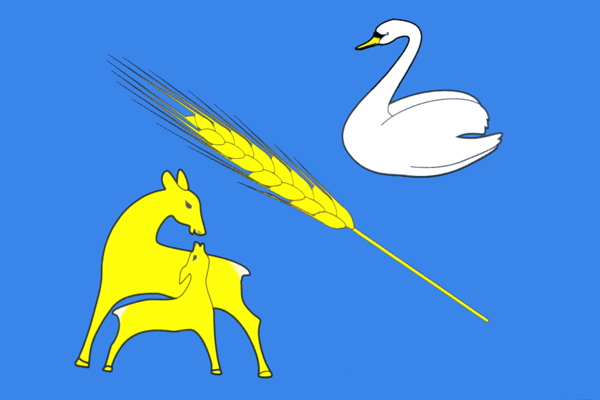
- Flag

- Location within Novosibirsk Oblast Location within Russia
- Coordinates: 54°23′27″N 77°38′08″E
- Country: Russia
- Region: Novosibirsk Oblast
- District: Kupinsky District
- Village Council: Kopkulsky Village Council
- Time zone: UTC+7:00
- Postcode: 632760

Kopkul (Russian: Копкуль) is a rural locality (a selo). It is the administrative center of the Kopkulsky Village Council, Kupinsky District, Novosibirsk Oblast, Russia.

Population: 675 (2010 census); 777 (2002 census);

== Geography ==
Kopkul lies between three small lakes, Kopkul, Mokhovoye and Gorkoye, in the Baraba Steppe to the southwest of lake Malye Chany. The nearest inhabited places are Baskovo, 8 km (5.0 mi) to the north, Chumashki, 10 km (6.2 mi) to the northeast, and Novonikolayevka 12 km (7.5 mi) to the WNW.
