= Novorozino =

Village in Novosibirsk Oblast, Russia

Novorozino Новорозино
- Village
- Location within Novosibirsk Oblast Location within Russia
- Coordinates: 54°39′07″N 77°47′38″E
- Country: Russia
- Region: Novosibirsk Oblast
- District: Kupinsky District
- Village Council: Novonikolaevsky Village Council
- Time zone: UTC+7:00
- Postcode: 632742

Novorozino (Russian: Новорозино) is a rural locality (a selo). It is part of the Novonikolaevsky Village Council of Kupinsky District, Novosibirsk Oblast, Russia.

Population: 290 (2010 census); 333 (2002 census);

== Geography ==
Novorozino lies close to the Kozhurla Sound (Протока Кожурла), the channel connecting Lake Chany and Malye Chany. The nearest inhabited place is Bogatikha, Barabinsky District, 5 km (3.1 mi) to the NNE.
