= Blagoveshchenka (Novosibirsk Oblast) =

Village in Novosibirsk Oblast, Russia

Blagoveshchenka Благовещенка
- Location within Novosibirsk Oblast Location within Russia
- Coordinates: 53°55′36″N 76°56′31″E
- Country: Russia
- Region: Novosibirsk Oblast
- District: Kupinsky District
- Village Council: Blagoveshchensky Village Council
- Time zone: UTC+7:00
- Postcode: 632757

Blagoveshchenka (Russian: Благовещенка) is a rural locality (a selo). It is the administrative center of the Blagoveshchensky Village Council of Kupinsky District, Novosibirsk Oblast, Russia. Population: 467 (2010 census); 567 (2002 census);

== Geography ==
Blagoveshchenka lies in the Baraba Steppe close to lakes Krasnovishnevoye to the south and Bolshoy Bagan to the east. The nearest town is Petropavlovka 7 km (4.3 mi) to the ESE.
