= Baskovo =

Village in Novosibirsk Oblast, Russia

Baskovo Басково
- Village
- Location within Novosibirsk Oblast Location within Russia
- Coordinates: 54°27′48″N 77°39′35″E
- Country: Russia
- Region: Novosibirsk Oblast
- District: Kupinsky District
- Village Council: Novonikolaevsky Village Council
- Time zone: UTC+7:00
- Postcode: 632748

Baskovo (Russian: Басково) is a rural locality (selo). It is part of the Novonikolaevsky Village Council, Kupinsky District, Novosibirsk Oblast, Russia.

Population: 125 (2010 census); 239 (2002 census);

== Geography ==
Baskovo lies in the Baraba Steppe to the west of lake Malye Chany. The nearest inhabited places are Chumashki, 7 km (4.3 mi) to the east, Kopkul 8 km (5.0 mi) to the south, and Novonikolayevka 15 km (9.3 mi) to the west.
