= Petropavlovka (Kupinsky District) =

Village in Novosibirsk Oblast, Russia

Petropavlovka Петропавловка
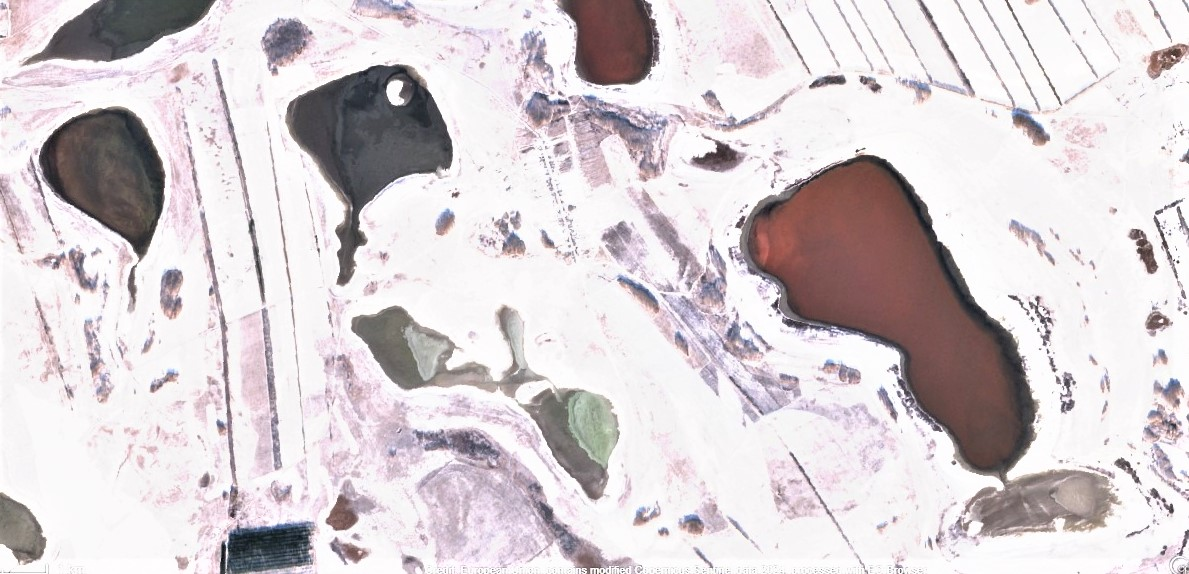
- Petropavlovka in the center above

- Location within Novosibirsk Oblast Location within Russia
- Coordinates: 53°54′40″N 77°03′46″E
- Country: Russia
- Region: Novosibirsk Oblast
- District: Kupinsky District
- Village Council: Blagoveshchensky Village Council
- Time zone: UTC+7:00
- Postcode: 632757

Petropavlovka (Russian: Петропавловка) is a rural locality (a selo). It is part of the Blagoveshchensky Village Council of Kupinsky District, Novosibirsk Oblast, Russia. Population: 112 (2010 census); 196 (2002 census);

== Geography ==
Petropavlovka lies in the Baraba Steppe close to lake Bolshoy Bagan to the east. The nearest towns are Blagoveshchenka, located 7 km (4.3 mi) to the WNW and Grushevka 6.5 km (4.0 mi) to the east beyond the lake.
