= Chistoozyorny =

Chistoozyorny/Chistoozerny (masculine), Chistoozyornaya/Chistoozernaya (feminine), or Chistoozyornoye/Chistoozernoye (neuter) may refer to:

- Chistoozyorny District, a district of Novosibirsk Oblast, Russia
- Chistoozyornoye, an urban locality (a work settlement) in Chistoozyorny District of Novosibirsk Oblast, Russia
