= Chumashki =

Village in Novosibirsk Oblast, Russia

Chumashki Чумашки
- Village
- Location within Novosibirsk Oblast Location within Russia
- Coordinates: 54°28′19″N 77°48′05″E
- Country: Russia
- Region: Novosibirsk Oblast
- District: Kupinsky District
- Village Council: Kopkulsky Village Council
- Time zone: UTC+7:00
- Postcode: 632747

Chumashki (Russian: Чумашки) is a rural locality (a selo). It is part of the Kopkulsky Village Council of Kupinsky District, Novosibirsk Oblast, Russia.

Population: 515 (2010 census); 586 (2002 census);

== Geography ==
Chumashki lies between two small lakes in the Baraba Steppe, 7.5 kilometers (4.7 mi) to the southwest of lake Malye Chany. The nearest inhabited places are Baskovo, 6.5 km (4.0 mi) to the west, and Kopkul, 10 km (6.2 mi) to the southwest.
