= Mayly =

Mayly Майлы
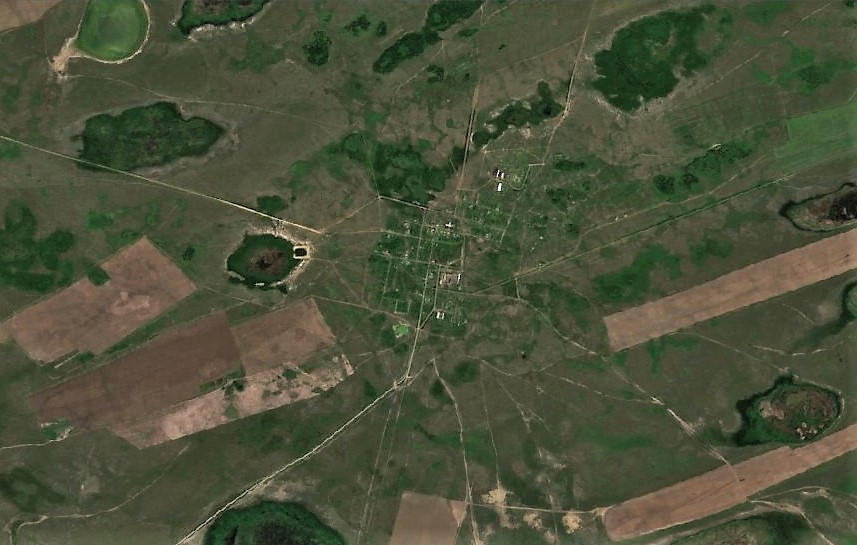
- Sentinel-2 image

- Location in Kazakhstan
- Coordinates: 54°14′59″N 76°35′45″E
- Country: Kazakhstan
- Region: Pavlodar Region
- District: Zhelezin District
- Rural District: Mayly Rural District

Population (2021)
  - Total: 237
- Time zone: UTC+6

Mayly (Kazakh: Майлы), Ozyornoye until 2023, is a settlement in Zhelezin District, Pavlodar Region, Kazakhstan. It is the administrative center of the Mayly Rural District (KATO code — 55425710). Population: 448 (2009 census results); 648 (1999 census results).

== Geography ==
Mayly is located 114 kilometers (71 mi) to the northeast of Zhelezinka, the district capital. It lies 11 kilometers (6.8 mi) to the west of lake Zharagash, very close to the Kazakhstan-Russia border.
