= Podolsk (Novosibirsk Oblast) =

Village in Russia

Podolsk Подольск
- Location within Novosibirsk Oblast Location within Russia
- Coordinates: 53°57′27″N 77°13′42″E
- Country: Russia
- Region: Novosibirsk Oblast
- District: Bagansky District
- Village Council: Ivanovsky Village Council
- Time zone: UTC+7:00
- Postcode: 632787

Podolsk (Russian: Подольск) is a rural locality (a selo). It is part of the Ivanovsky Village Council of Bagansky District, Novosibirsk Oblast, Russia. Population: 110 (2010 census); 140 (2002 census);

== Geography ==
Podolsk lies in the Baraba Steppe 5 km (3.1 mi) to the northeast of lake Bolshoy Bagan. The nearest town is Grushevka, located 5 km (3.1 mi) to the southwest.
