= Romanovka (Bagansky District) =

Village in Russia

Romanovka Романовка
- Location within Novosibirsk Oblast Location within Russia
- Coordinates: 53°51′32″N 77°16′48″E
- Country: Russia
- Region: Novosibirsk Oblast
- District: Bagansky District
- Village Council: Andreyevsky Village Council
- Time zone: UTC+7:00
- Postcode: 632791

Romanovka (Russian: Романовка) is a rural locality (a selo). It is part of the Andreyevsky Village Council of Bagansky District, Novosibirsk Oblast, Russia. Population: 120 (2010 census); 145 (2002 census);

== Geography ==
Romanovka lies in the Baraba Steppe 9 km (5.6 mi) to the southeast of lake Bolshoy Bagan. The nearest town is Terengul, located 8 km (5.0 mi) to the WSW.
