= Medyakovo =

Village in Novosibirsk Oblast, Russia

Medyakovo Медяково
- Village
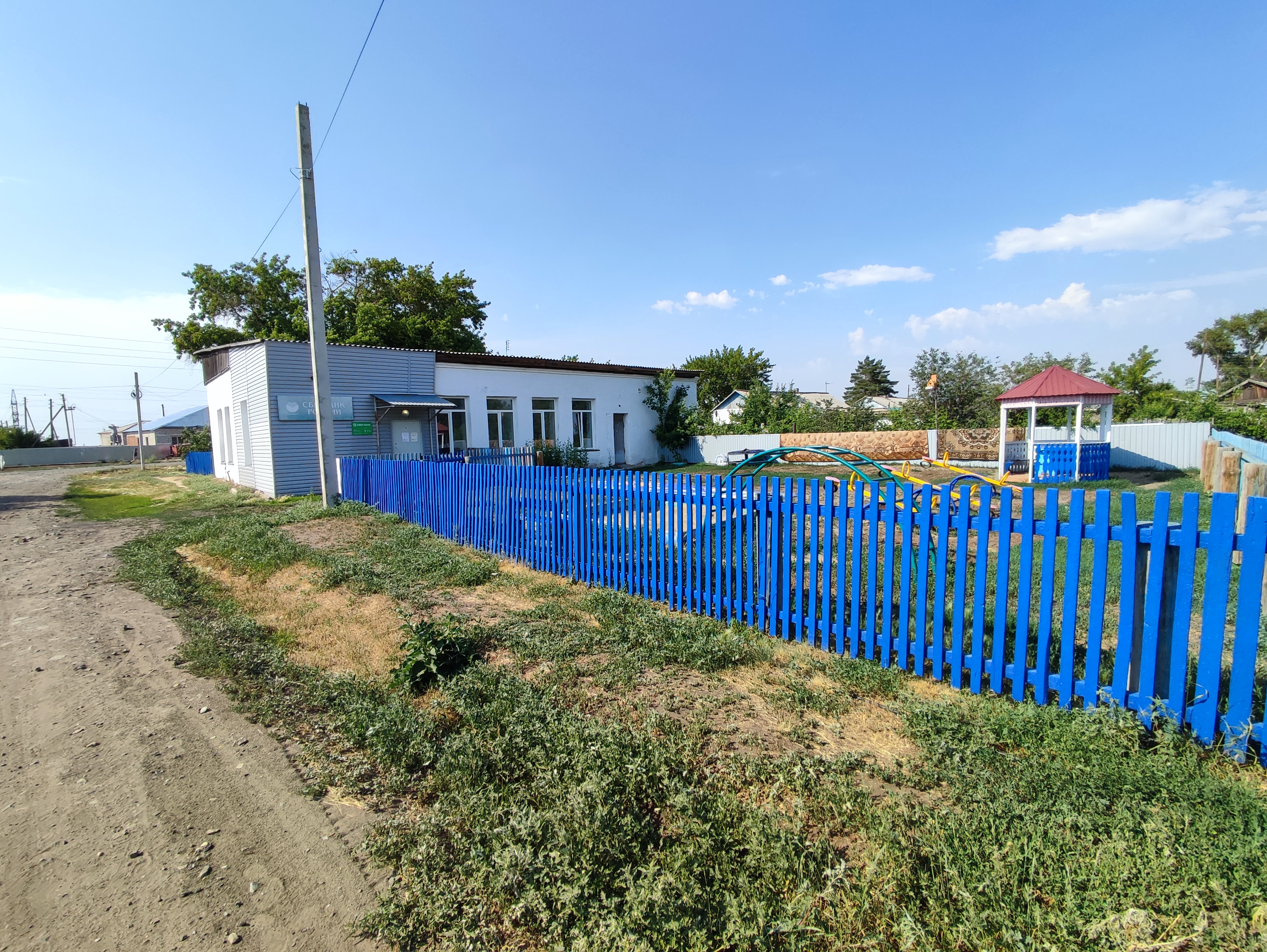
- Picket fence in Medyakovo

- Location within Novosibirsk Oblast Location within Russia
- Coordinates: 54°07′36″N 77°05′20″E
- Country: Russia
- Region: Novosibirsk Oblast
- District: Kupinsky District
- Village Council: Medyakovskoye Village Council
- Time zone: UTC+7:00
- Postcode: 632754

Medyakovo (Russian: Медяково) is a rural locality (a selo) in Kupinsky District, Novosibirsk Oblast, Russia. It is the administrative center of the Medyakovskoye Village Council.

Population: 576 (2010 census); 782 (2002 census);

== Geography ==
Medyakovo lies in the Baraba Steppe 17 km (11 mi) to the southeast of the Kazakhstan-Russia border. Ivanovka is located 16 km (9.9 mi) to the southeast.
