= Kyzyltuz =

Kyzyltuz (Kazakh: Қызылтұз; "red salt") may refer to:

- Kyzyltuz (Akkuly District), a lake in the Kulunda Plain, Pavlodar Region, Kazakhstan
- Kyzyltuz (Zhelezin District), a lake group in the Baraba Plain, Pavlodar Region, Kazakhstan
