= Zharagash =

- Жарағаш
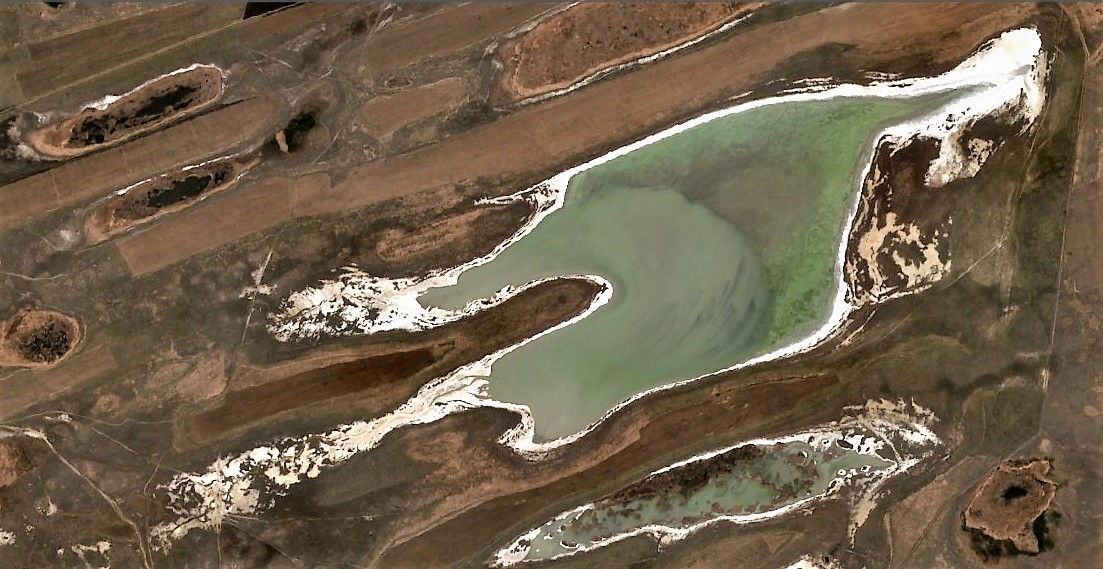
- Sentinel-2 picture of the lake in May

- Location within Kazakhstan
- Location: Baraba Plain
- Coordinates: 54°14′39″N 76°46′27″E
- Type: Salt lake
- Basin countries: Kazakhstan
- Max. length: 5 kilometers (3.1 mi)
- Max. width: 3.5 kilometers (2.2 mi)
- Surface area: 11.4 square kilometers (4.4 sq mi)
- Islands: none
- Settlements: Pavlodar

Zharagash (Kazakh: Жарағаш; Russian: Жарагаш) is a salt lake in Zhelezin District, Pavlodar Region, Kazakhstan.

The lake lies 11 kilometers (6.8 mi) to the east of Mayly village, about 0.3 kilometers (0.19 mi) west of the Kazakhstan-Russia border, and 31 kilometers (19 mi) to the WSW of Kupino, Novosibirsk Oblast, Russian Federation.

== Geography ==
Zharagash is part of the Irtysh basin. It is a steppe lake of the Baraba Plain, located about 60 kilometers (37 mi) to the southwest of Lake Chany, the largest lake of the area, on the other side of the border. The Kyzyltuz lake group, with pink lake Krasnovishnevoye on the Russian side, lies 43 kilometers (27 mi) to the south.

The shores of the lake are flat, with two big indentations on the western side and a long projection in the east. The water is salty and its salinity increases in the summer, when it often dries up, becoming a salt marsh.

== Flora and fauna ==
The environment of Zharagash is too strongly saline to support any fauna in its waters. Reeds and grasses grow in some stretches of the salt marshes surrounding the lake.

== See also ==
- List of lakes of Kazakhstan
