= Yudino (Novosibirsk Oblast) =

Village in Novosibirsk Oblast, Russia

Yudino Юдино
- Village
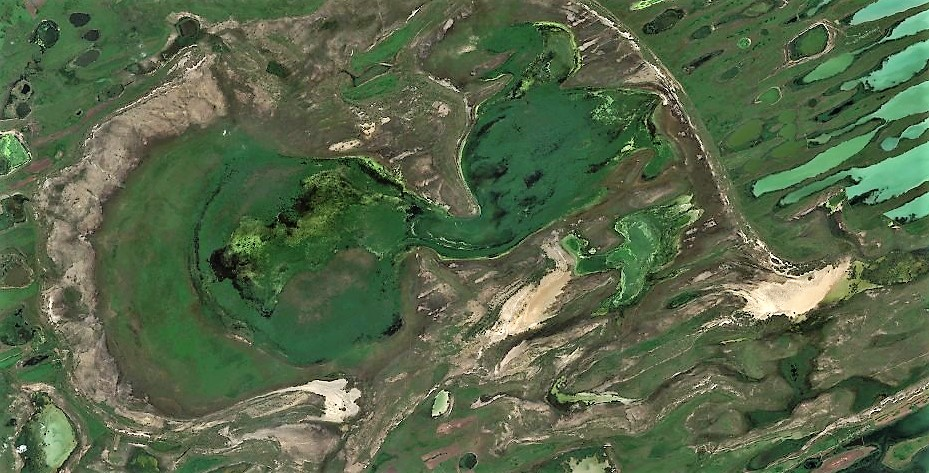
- Yudino near the left edge of the image

- Location within Novosibirsk Oblast Location within Russia
- Coordinates: 54°45′25″N 76°44′38″E
- Country: Russia
- Region: Novosibirsk Oblast
- District: Chistoozyorny District
- Municipal formation: Chistoozyornoye workers' settlement
- Time zone: UTC+7:00
- Postcode: 632720

Yudino (Russian: Юдино) is a village (selo). It is part of the urban settlement of the Chistoozyornoye workers' settlement, Chistoozyorny District, Novosibirsk Oblast, Russia. Population: 43 (2010 census); 104 (2002 census);

== Geography ==
Yudino lies in the Baraba Steppe close to the western end of lake Chany, on the shore of the now dry Yudinsky Reach.
