= Grushevka, Novosibirsk Oblast =

Village in Russia

Grushevka Грушевка
- Village
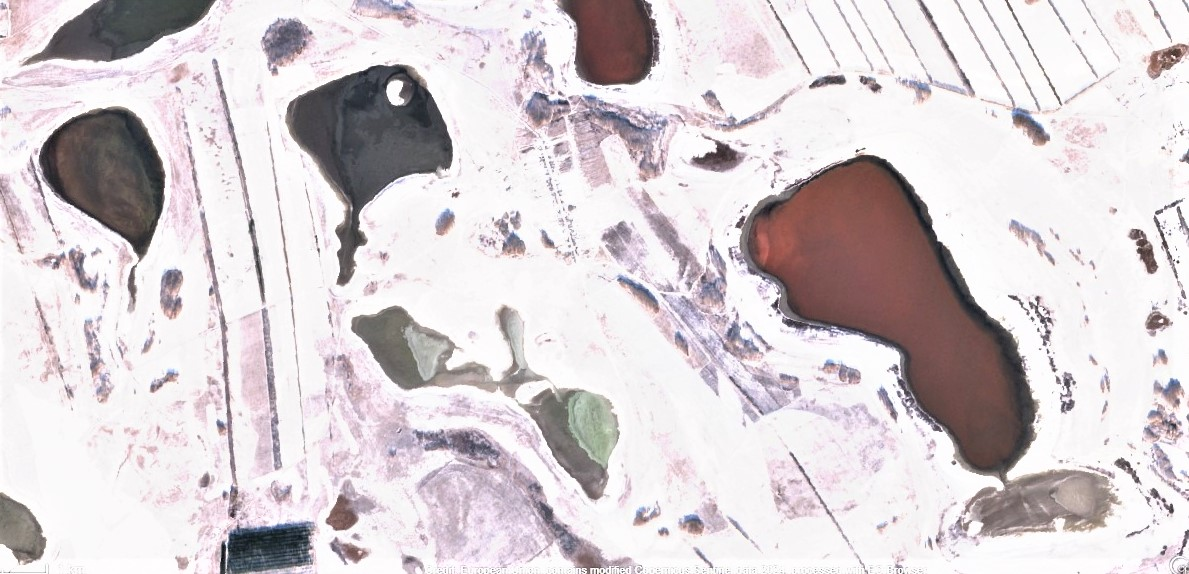
- Grushevka in the upper right

- Location within Novosibirsk Oblast Location within Russia
- Coordinates: 53°55′06″N 77°10′37″E
- Country: Russia
- Region: Novosibirsk Oblast
- District: Bagansky District
- Village Council: Ivanovsky Village Council
- Time zone: UTC+7:00
- Postcode: 632787

Grushevka (Russian: Грушевка) is a rural locality (a selo). It is part of the Ivanovsky Village Council of Bagansky District, Novosibirsk Oblast, Russia. Population: 126 (2010 census); 158 (2002 census);

== Geography ==
Grushevka lies in the Baraba Steppe close to lake Bolshoy Bagan to the west. The nearest towns are Petropavlovka, located 6.5 km (4.0 mi) to the west beyond the lake, and Podolsk to the northeast.
