= Kyzyltuz (Zhelezin District) =

Lake in Kazakhstan

- Қызылтұз
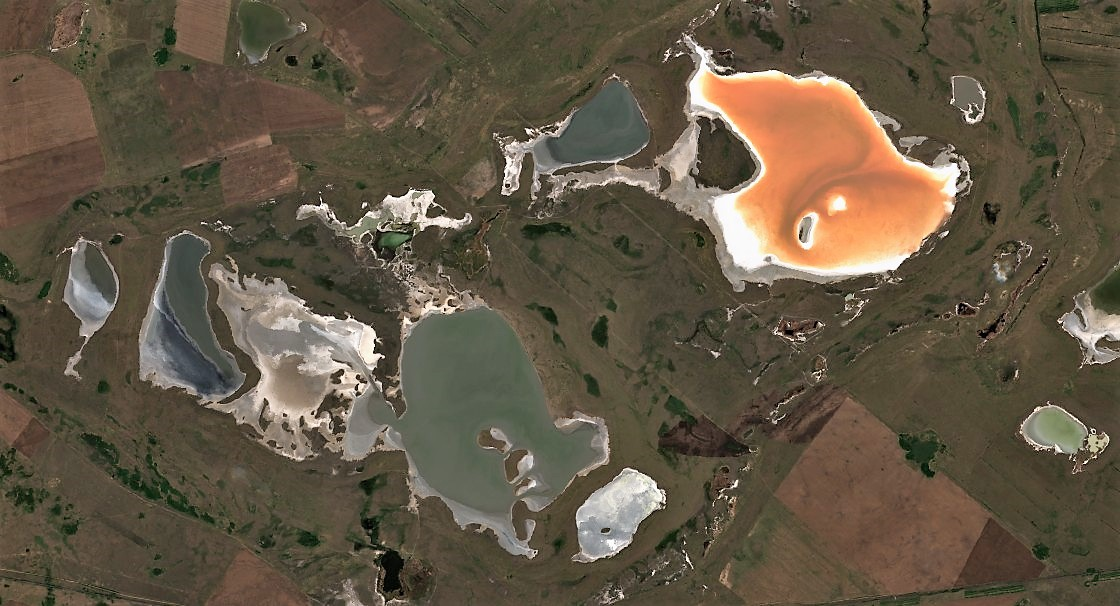
- Sentinel-2 picture of the lake group with pink lake Krasnovishnevoye in the upper right

- Location within Kazakhstan
- Location: Baraba Plain; West Siberian Plain
- Coordinates: 53°47′08″N 76°48′50″E
- Type: Salt lake
- Basin countries: Kazakhstan
- Max. length: 10.8 kilometers (6.7 mi)
- Max. width: 5.8 kilometers (3.6 mi)
- Surface area: 22.8 square kilometers (8.8 sq mi)
- Average depth: 0.3 meters (1 ft 0 in)
- Max. depth: 2 meters (6 ft 7 in)
- Residence time: UTC+6
- Shore length^{1}: 41.6 kilometers (25.8 mi)
- Surface elevation: 93 meters (305 ft)
- Islands: yes
- ^{1} Shore length is not a well-defined measure.

Kyzyltuz (Kazakh: Қызылтұз Russian: Кызылтуз) is a salt lake group in Zhelezin District, Pavlodar Region, Kazakhstan.

The lakes lie 6 kilometers (3.7 mi) to the northwest of Krasnovka village, in the area of the Kazakhstan-Russia border, and 90 kilometers (56 mi) to the ENE of Zhelezinka, the district capital.

== Geography ==
Kyzyltuz is part of the Irtysh basin. It is a steppe lake cluster at the southern limit of the Baraba Plain; it includes lake Krasnovishnevoye that lies on the other side of the border. The Sheldauk hot springs are located 1 kilometer (0.62 mi) to the south of the southern shore.

The shores of the main lake are flat, with a few irregular-shaped islands in the central area and a deeply indented northern shoreline with a southward projecting headland. There is a separate small lake in the west and another in the east which are aligned with the central lake in a roughly NW - SE direction. The water is salty and the lakes are surrounded by solonetz soil. The bottom is muddy and the mud is reputed to have medicinal properties. In the summer parts of the lake usually dry up and become a salt marsh, the shallow central section drying earlier. In some years all lakes of the group dry up. Other lakes in the area are Zharagash, 43 kilometers (27 mi) to the north and Ulken Azhbolat 60 kilometers (37 mi) to the southeast.

== Flora and fauna ==
The Kyzyltuz lakes are surrounded by steppe vegetation. The waters of the lake cluster are too strongly saline for fish, but Artemia salina thrive in the summer. 35 metric tons (34 long tons; 39 short tons) of the small crustaceans were harvested in 2002.

== See also ==
- List of lakes of Kazakhstan
