= Terengul (village) =

Village in Novosibirsk Oblast, Russia

Terengul Теренгуль
- Location within Novosibirsk Oblast Location within Russia
- Coordinates: 53°49′39″N 77°09′40″E
- Country: Russia
- Region: Novosibirsk Oblast
- District: Bagansky District
- Village Council: Andreyevsky Village Council
- Time zone: UTC+7:00
- Postcode: 632793

Terengul (Russian: Теренгуль) is a rural locality (a selo). It is part of the Andreyevsky Village Council of Bagansky District, Novosibirsk Oblast, Russia. Population: 445 (2010 census); 453 (2002 census);

== Geography ==
Terengul lies in the Baraba Steppe 6 km (3.7 mi) to the south of lake Bolshoy Bagan and 11 km (6.8 mi) to the east of lake Krasnovishnevoye. The nearest town is Romanovka, located 8 km (5.0 mi) to the ENE.
