= Kurumbel Steppe =

Steppe in Novosibirsk Oblast, Russia

- Steppe
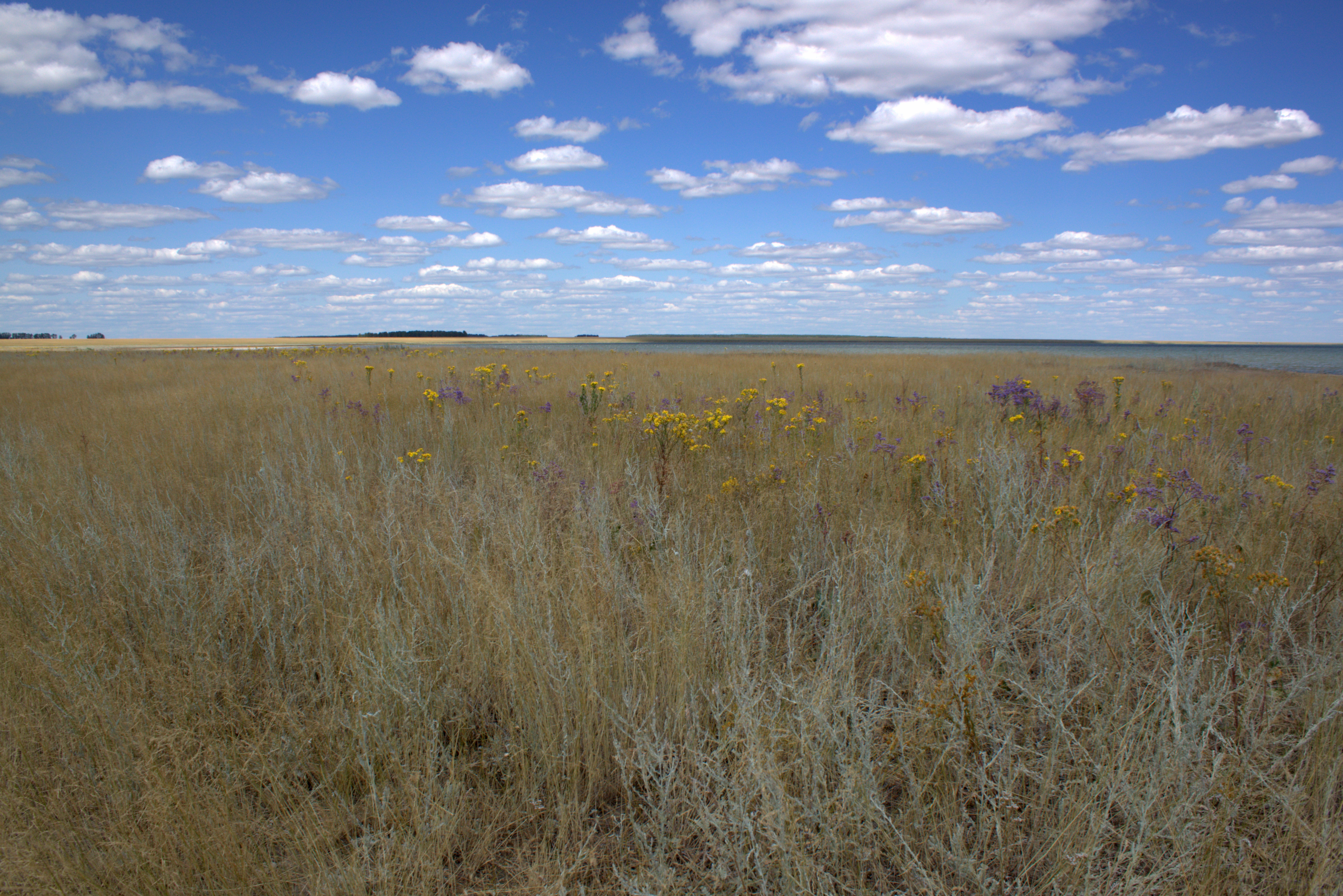
- Kurumbel Steppe in 2010

- Kurumbel Steppe
- Coordinates: 54.4167°N 75.4167°E

Kurumbel Steppe (Russian: Курумбельская степь) is a steppe in Omsk and Novosibirsk oblasts, Western Siberia, Russia. It is located between the Irtysh River and Lake Chany. The name comes from the former village of Kurumbel.

== Birds ==
At least 126 species of birds nest here: demoiselle crane, little bustard, pallid harrier, red-footed falcon, black-winged pratincole, common crane etc.

In spring and autumn, numerous Arctic and sub-Arctic migrant birds stop here for rest and feeding.

Kurumbel steppe is of great international significance, for at least 5 bird species.

== Lakes ==
The Kurumbel Steppe contains numerous small lakes west of Lake Chany, such as Ulzhai and Chebakly.

== Gallery ==
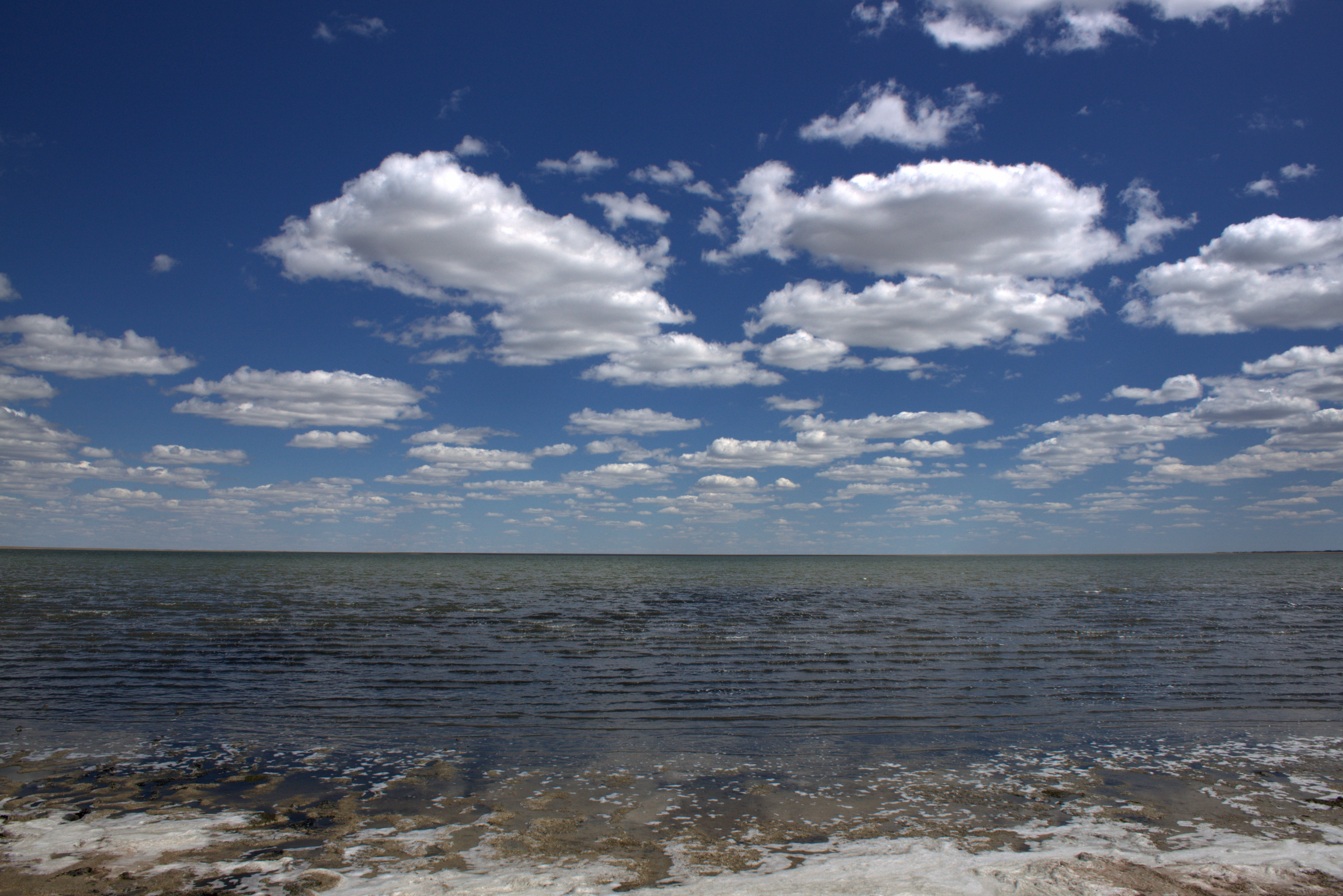

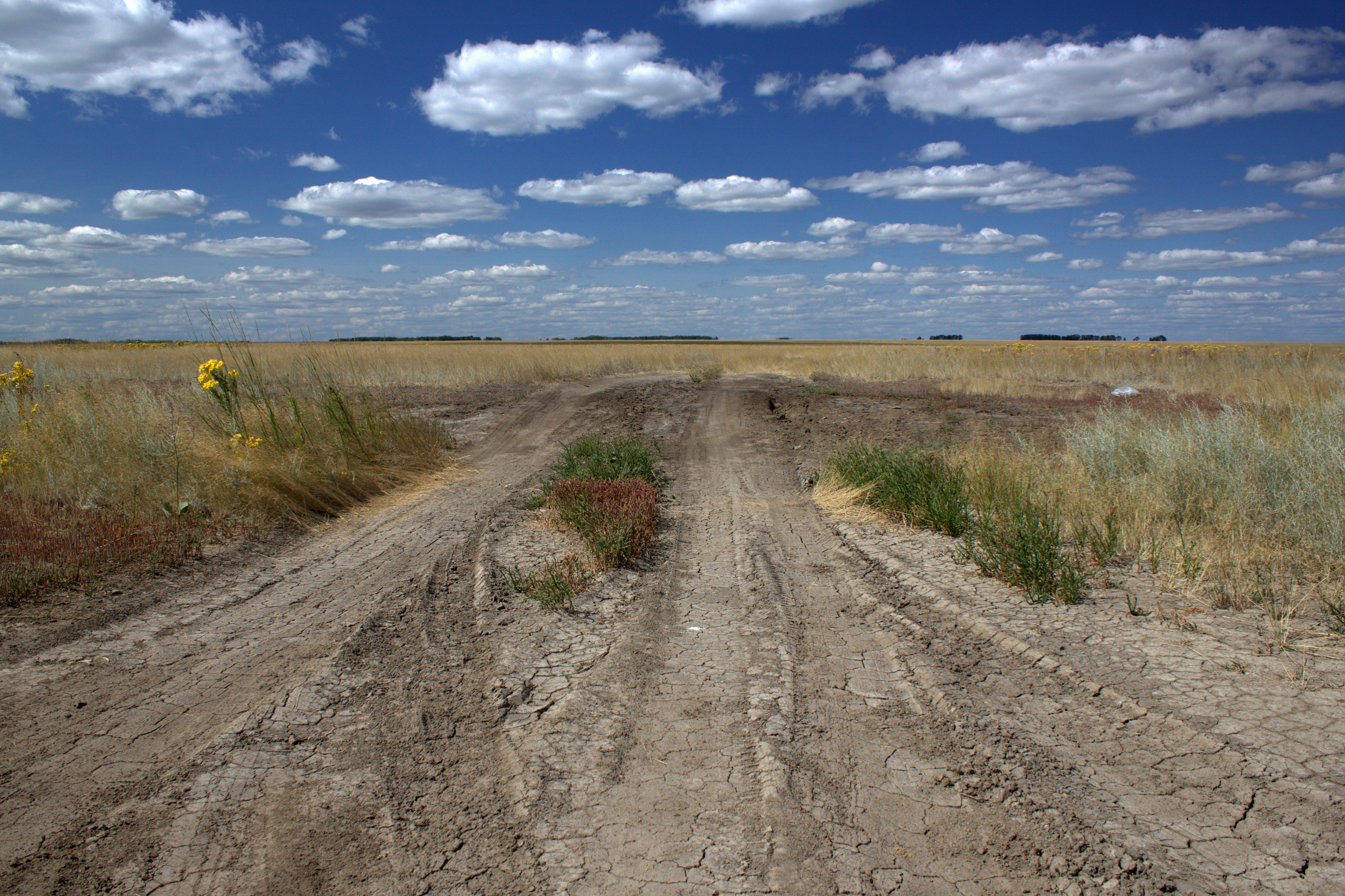

== See also ==
- Baraba steppe
