= Novonikolayevka (Kupinsky District) =

Village in Novosibirsk Oblast, Russia

Novonikolayevka Новониколаевка
- Village
- Location within Novosibirsk Oblast Location within Russia
- Coordinates: 54°26′24″N 77°25′44″E
- Country: Russia
- Region: Novosibirsk Oblast
- District: Kupinsky District
- Village Council: Novonikolaevsky Village Council
- Time zone: UTC+7:00
- Postcode: 632748

Novonikolayevka (Russian: Новониколаевка) is a rural locality (a selo). It is the administrative head of the Novonikolaevsky Village Council, Kupinsky District, Novosibirsk Oblast, Russia.

Population: 446 (2010 census); 533 (2002 census);

== Geography ==
Novonikolayevka lies in the Baraba Steppe to the south of lake Yarkul. The nearest inhabited places are Kupino 9 km (5.6 mi) to the southwest, and Baskovo 15 km (9.3 mi) to the east.
