= Tandovo =

Lake in Novosibirsk Oblast, Russia

- Тандово
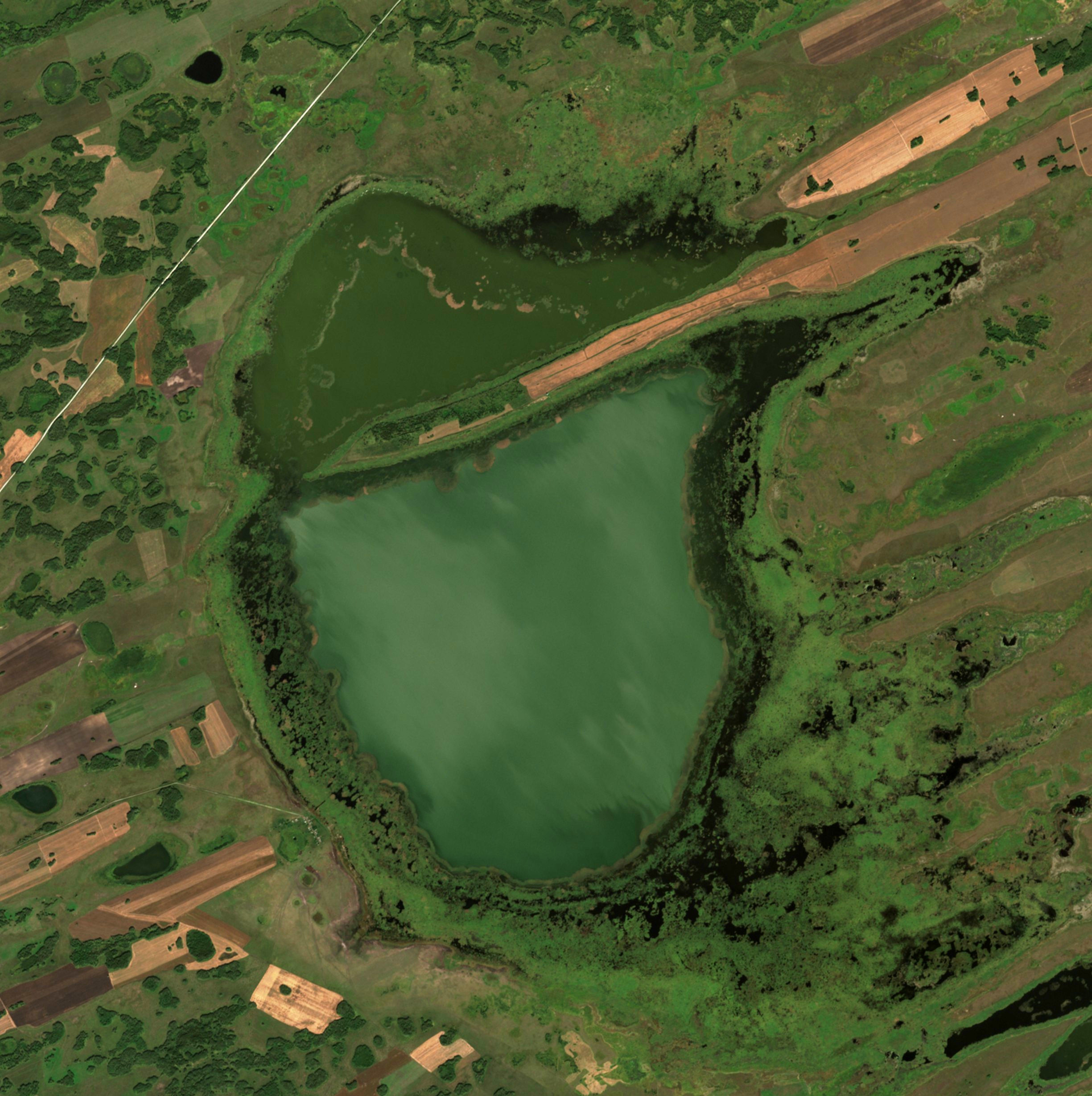
- Sentinel-2 picture of the lake in 2021

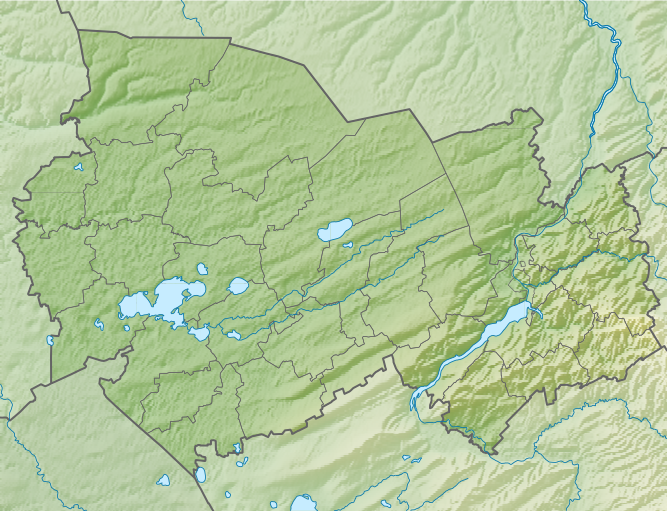
- Location within Novosibirsk Oblast Location within Russia
- Location: West Siberian Plain
- Coordinates: 55°07′N 78°0′E
- Primary inflows: Tandovka
- Catchment area: 1,180 square kilometers (460 sq mi)
- Basin countries: Russia
- Max. length: 9 kilometers (5.6 mi)
- Max. width: 7 kilometers (4.3 mi)
- Surface area: 87.8 square kilometers (33.9 sq mi)
- Max. depth: 2 meters (6 ft 7 in)
- Surface elevation: 110 meters (360 ft)
- Islands: None

Tandovo (Russian: Тандово) is a lake in Barabinsky District, Novosibirsk Oblast, south-central Russia.

Its waters are brackish. The Sugun Peninsula is a tongue of land projecting into the northern end of the lake from the northeastern shore. It is a protected area where rare plants grow.

== Geography ==
With an area of 87.8 square kilometers (33.9 sq mi) Tandovo is one of the largest lakes in Novosibirsk Oblast. It is located in the Baraba Lowland, the southern sector of the West Siberian Plain, 33 kilometers (21 mi) SW of Barabinsk. The lake lies 8 kilometers (5.0 mi) to the north of the northeastern end of Lake Chany, in the endorheic basin between the Ob and Irtysh rivers. In the northern half of the lake, the 7 kilometers (4.3 mi) long and 0.5 kilometers (0.31 mi) wide Sugun Peninsula almost cuts Lake Tandovo in two.

The banks of Lake Tandovo are clifflike in places, reaching heights of 5 meters (16 ft) to 8 meters (26 ft). The Tandovka River flows into the eastern shore of the lake. Its waters freeze in early November and the lake stays under ice until May.

== See also ==
- list of lakes in Russia
