= Tsvetnopolye =

Tsvetnopolye (Russian: Цветнополье) is the name of several rural localities in Russia:

- Tsvetnopolye, Novosibirsk Oblast, a village in Chistoozyorny District of Novosibirsk Oblast
- Tsvetnopolye, Omsk Oblast, a selo in Azovsky Nemetsky National District of Omsk Oblast
