= Ivanovka (Bagansky District) =

Village in Novosibirsk Oblast, Russia

Ivanovka Ивановка
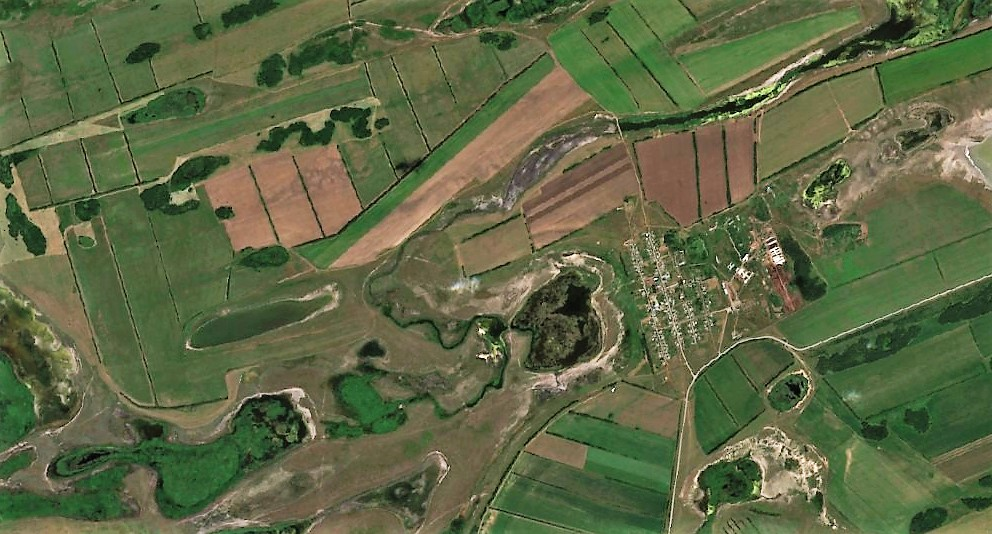
- Ivanovka (right) and lake Ivanovskoye Sentinel-2 image.

- Location within Novosibirsk Oblast Location within Russia
- Coordinates: 54°00′30″N 77°14′25″E
- Country: Russia
- Region: Novosibirsk Oblast
- District: Bagansky District
- Village Council: Ivanovsky Village Council
- Time zone: UTC+7:00
- Postcode: 632787

Ivanovka (Russian: Ивановка) is a rural locality (a selo). It is the administrative center of the Ivanovsky Village Council of Bagansky District, Novosibirsk Oblast, Russia. Population: 526 (2010 census); 480 (2002 census);

== Geography ==
Ivanovka lies in the Baraba Steppe by lake Ivanovskoye, at the end of the Bagan river. Lake Bolshoy Bagan is located 14 km (8.7 mi) to the southwest and Medyakovo village 16 km (9.9 mi) to the northwest.
