= List of drying lakes =

Satellite imagery over Iran from 1984 to 2014 revealing Lake Urmia's diminishing surface area.

A number of natural lakes throughout the world are drying or completely dry owing to irrigation or urban use diverting inflow.

== List ==
List of drying lakes
Lake name	Location	Coordinates	Original size	as of	Reduced size	as of	References
Aral Sea	Kazakhstan and Uzbekistan	45°N 60°E	68,000 km^{2} (26,000 mi^{2})	1960	14,280 km^{2} (5,510 mi^{2})	2010	
Lake Chad	Cameroon, Chad, Niger and Nigeria	13.0°N 14.5°E	25,000 km^{2} (9,700 mi^{2})	1963	2,000 km^{2} (770 mi^{2})	2015	
Qinghai Lake	China	37.0°N 100.1°E	6,000 km^{2} (2,300 mi^{2})		4,543 km^{2} (1,754 mi^{2})	2020	
Lake Urmia	Iran	37.7°N 45.4°E	5,000 km^{2} (1,900 mi^{2})		2,820 km^{2} (1,090 mi^{2})	2021	
Great Salt Lake	Utah, U.S.	41.2°N 112.5°W	4,400 km^{2} (1,700 mi^{2})	1980s	2,500 km^{2} (950 mi^{2})	2021	
Poyang Lake	Jiangxi, China	29.1°N 116.3°E	3,500 km^{2} (1,400 mi^{2})		200 km^{2} (77 mi^{2})	2012	
Lake Poopó	Bolivia	18.6°S 67.1°W	3,000 km^{2} (1,200 mi^{2})		0	2015	
Lake Chany	Novosibirsk Oblast, Russia	54.8°N 77.5°E	2,500 km^{2} (970 mi^{2})	1970	1,700 km^{2} (660 mi^{2})	2024	
Hamun Lake	Irano-Afghan border	30.8°N 61.7°E	2,000 km^{2} (770 mi^{2})		0	2002	
Lop Nur	Xinjiang, China	40.5°N 90.5°E	2,000 km^{2} (770 mi^{2})	1950s	0	1970	
Tulare Lake	California, U.S.	36.0°N 119.8°W	1,800 km^{2} (690 mi^{2})	1880	5.2 km^{2} (2 mi^{2})	2023	
Lake Chapala	Mexico	20.2°N 103.0°W	1,048 km^{2} (405 mi^{2})	1986	812 km^{2} (314 mi^{2})	2001	
Dead Sea	Israel, Jordan, and Palestine	31.5°N 35.5°E	1,030 km^{2} (400 mi^{2})	1960	605 km^{2} (234 mi^{2})	2016	
Lake Ebinur	Xinjiang, China	44.9°N 83°E	1,000 km^{2} (390 mi^{2})	1955	500 km^{2} (190 mi^{2})	2014	
Salton Sea	California, U.S.	33.3°N 115.8°W	940 km^{2} (363 mi^{2})	2003	832 km^{2} (321 mi^{2})	2022	
Lake Faguibine	Mali	16.7°N 4.0°W	590 km^{2} (230 mi^{2})	1974	0	2000	
Pyramid Lake	Nevada, U.S.	40.1°N 119.6°W	510 km^{2} (195 mi^{2})				
Lake Amik	Turkey	36.3°N 36.3°E	300–350 km^{2} (120–140 mi^{2})	1950s	0	2012	
Lake Cuitzeo	Michoacán, Mexico	19.93°N 101.08°W	300 km^{2} (120 mi^{2})	1941			
Owens Lake	California, U.S.	36.43°N 117.95°W	280 km^{2} (110 mi^{2})	1913	0	1926	
Walker Lake	Nevada, U.S.	38.69°N 118.74°W	280 km^{2} (107 mi^{2})	1882	130 km^{2} (50 mi^{2})	2005	
Alan Nur	Xinjiang, China	45.80°N 85.93°E	238 km^{2} (92 mi^{2})	1950	0	1970	
Mono Lake	California, U.S.	38.02°N 119.01°W	220 km^{2} (86 mi^{2})	1941	180 km^{2} (70 mi^{2})	2023	
Lake Albert	South Australia	35.63°S 139.28°E			168 km^{2} (65 mi^{2})		
Lake Hindmarsh	Australia	36.06°S 141.91°E	135 km^{2} (52 mi^{2})	1975	0	2000	
Lake Shalkar	Kazakhstan	47°48′N 59°35′E	60 km^{2} (23 mi^{2})	1900	7.9 km^{2} (3.1 mi^{2})	2024	
Lake Hula	Israel	33.1°N 35.6°E	14 km^{2} (5.4 mi^{2})	1940s	0	1950s	

== See also ==
- Lists of lakes
- Dry lake
