= Chinyaikha =

Island in Novosibirsk Oblast, Russia

Native name: Чиняиха
- Interactive map of Chinyaikha

Geography
- Location: Lake Chany
- Coordinates: 54.773°N 77.519°E

Administration
- Russia
- district: Siberia
- subject: Novosibirsk Oblast

Chinyaikha (Russian: Чиняиха), or Chinyayev, Chinyayevsky, is an island on Lake Chany, which is located in Novosibirsk Oblast, Russia.

== Archaeological excavations ==
In 1928, Omsk archaeologist Varvara Levashova investigated two burial mounds and the ancient settlement on the island.

== Clay toys ==
Fragments of children's clay toys are found on the island, which have a number of features: they are compressed vertically, the hands are pressed and folded on the stomach. The Chinyaev toy appeared in the 18th century as a folk memory of unusual creatures that, according to local legends, lived on the islands of Lake Chany. There are toys depicting birds, animals, mythological characters (vodyanoys, rusalkas, the most fantastic forms of fish etc.). These toys have a terrible and gruff appearance. In 2014, the toy was presented at The First All-Russian Festival of Folk Culture in Sochi.

== Legends ==
There are two versions of one legend about this island.
