= Krasnovishnevoye =

Salt lake in Russia

- Красновишневое
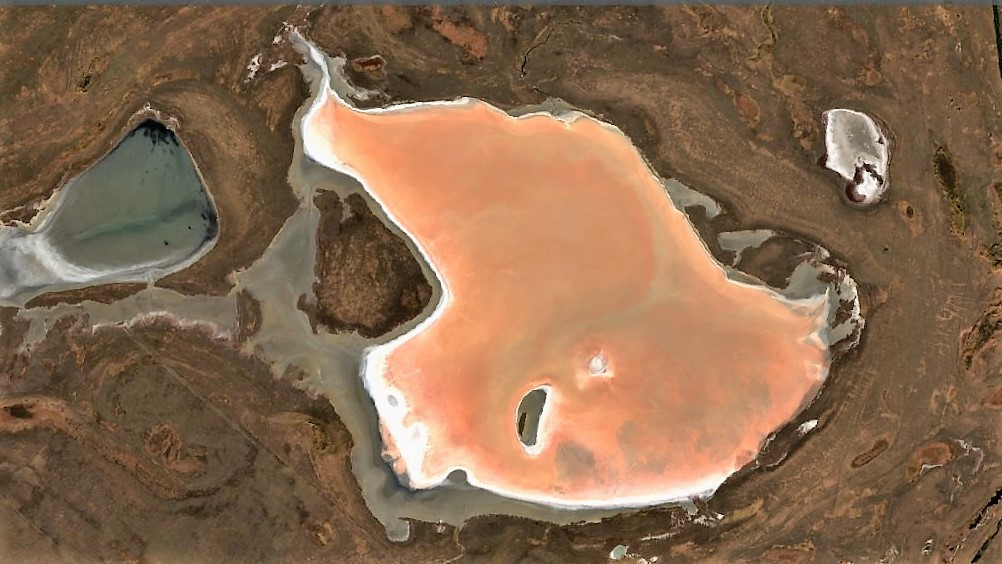
- Sentinel-2 picture of Krasnovishnevoye

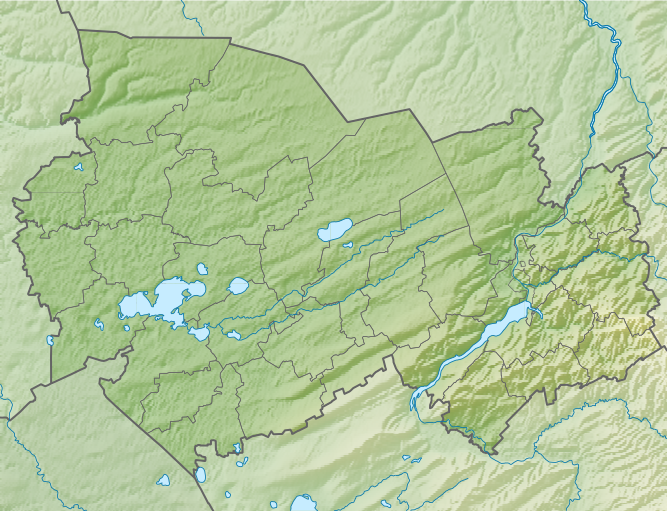
- Location within Novosibirsk Oblast Location within Russia
- Location: Baraba Lowland; West Siberian Plain
- Coordinates: 53°50′27″N 76°55′55″E
- Type: endorheic
- Basin countries: Russia
- Max. length: 6.5 kilometers (4.0 mi)
- Max. width: 3.9 kilometers (2.4 mi)
- Surface area: 17.1 square kilometers (6.6 sq mi)
- Residence time: UTC+7
- Surface elevation: 93 meters (305 ft)
- Islands: yes

Krasnovishnevoye (Russian: Красновишневое) is a salt lake in Kupinsky District, Novosibirsk Oblast, Russian Federation.

The lake is located at the southwestern end of the Oblast. The nearest inhabited places are Blagoveshchenka 7 kilometers (4.3 mi) to the north and Terengul 11 kilometers (6.8 mi) to the east. The western lakeshore lies 0.2 kilometers (0.12 mi) to the east of the Kazakhstan–Russia border.

== Geography ==
Krasnovishnevoye lies in the Baraba Lowland, West Siberian Plain. It is part of the Kyzyltuz lake group. The lake is shallow and has a roughly triangular shape. There is one islet in the southwestern sector. Located in an area of lakes, Krasnovishnevoye displays unusual characteristics compared to its immediate neighbors. One theory is that it is the site where a meteorite fell in the past. But so far no research has been carried out to establish whether there are meteorite fragments under the layer of salt and mud at the center of the lake.

Krasnovishnevoye has a pink color for the most part of the year. Its water is hypersaline. Regarding phytoplankton and presence of purple bacteria there are similarities between Krasnovishnevoye and some salt lakes of the Kulunda Plain, such as Malinovoye, but its harsher water conditions restrict its biodiversity to prokaryotes and unicellular algae.

Smaller lake Gorkoye straddles the border 0.7 kilometers (0.43 mi) to the west, Bolshoy Bagan lies 11 kilometers (6.8 mi) to the northeast and Bolshoye Topolnoye 80 kilometers (50 mi) to the southeast. Lake Zharagash is in Kazakhstan, 41 kilometers (25 mi) to the north, and Bolshoy Azhbulat 62 kilometers (39 mi) to the SSE.

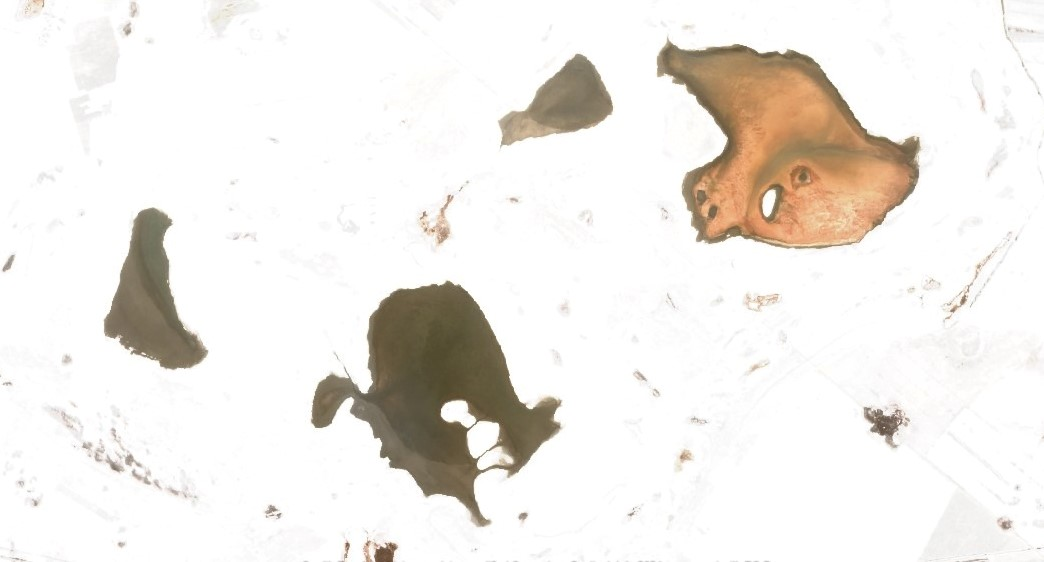
Winter Sentinel-2 picture of the Kyzyltuz group with Krasnovishnevoye in the upper right.

== See also ==
- List of lakes of Russia
- Pink lake
