= Ostrov Amel'kina Griva =

Russian island

Coordinates: 54°55′N 77°46′E

Ostrov Amel'kina Griva (Russian: Остров Амелькина Грива) is a Russian island located in Lake Chany, Russia, approximately 7 km from Bekhten.
