= Yudino, Voronezh Oblast =

Yudino Юдино
- Selo
- Location within Voronezh Oblast Location within Russia
- Coordinates: 50°41′N 39°43′E
- Country: Russia
- Region: Voronezh Oblast
- District: Podgorensky District
- Time zone: UTC+3:00

Yudino (Russian: Ю́дино) is a rural locality (a selo) and the administrative center of Yudinskoye Rural Settlement, Podgorensky District, Voronezh Oblast, Russia. The population was 488 as of 2010. There are 9 streets.

== Geography ==
Yudino is located 36 km north of Podgorensky (the district's administrative centre) by road. Kostomarovo is the nearest rural locality.
