= Zhelezin District =

Coordinates: 53°33′N 75°21′E

Zhelezin
- District
- Железин ауданы
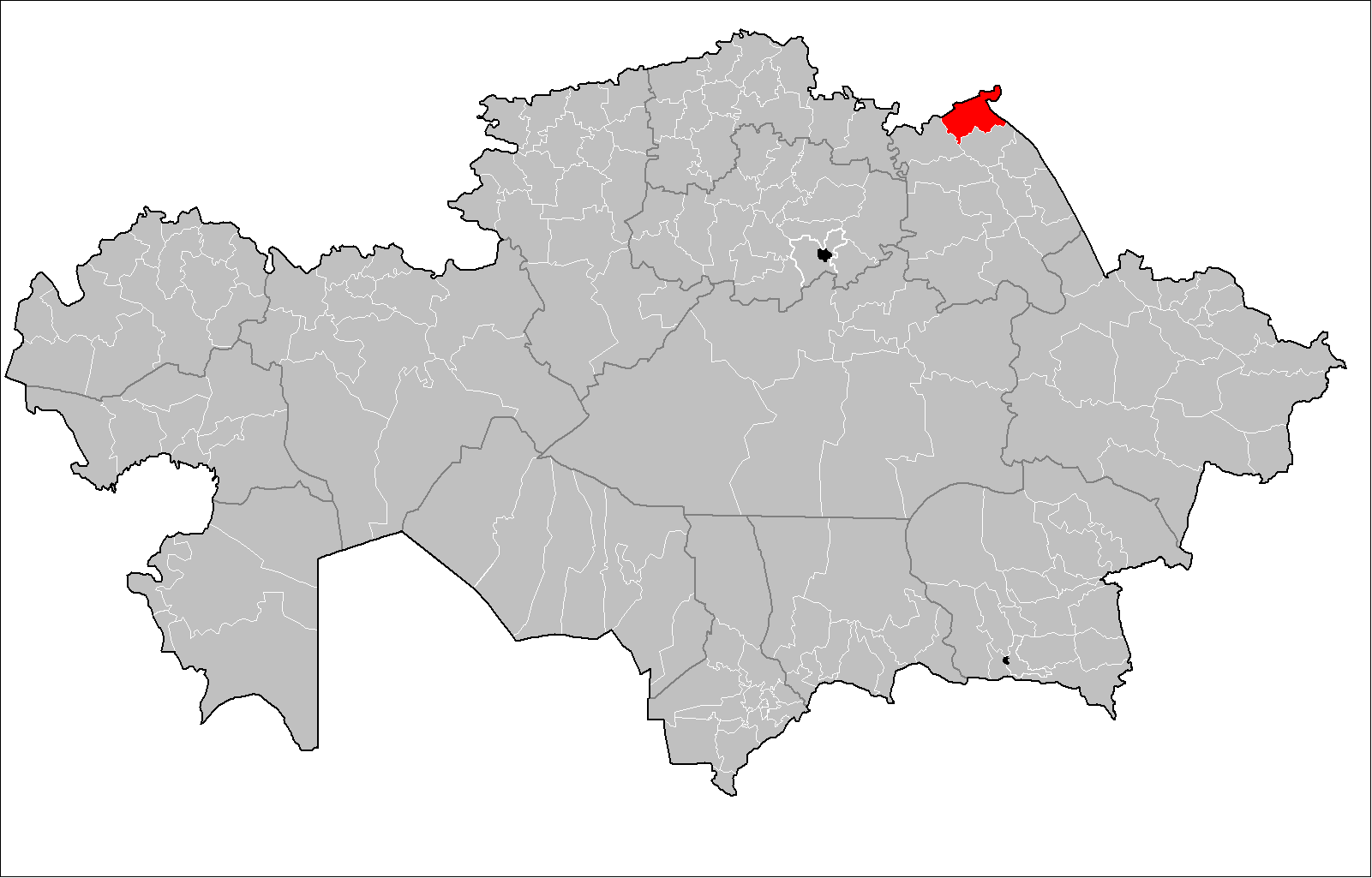
- Country: Kazakhstan
- Region: Pavlodar Region
- Administrative center: Zhelezinka
- Founded: 1938

Government
  - Akim: Shaykhimov Aitugan Abylayevich

Area
  - Total: 3,000 sq mi (7,700 km^{2})

Population (2013)
  - Total: 16,907
- Time zone: UTC+6 (East)

Zhelezin (Kazakh: Железин ауданы, Jelezin audany) is a district of Pavlodar Region in northern Kazakhstan. The administrative center of the district is Zhelezinka village . Population: 16,907 (2013 estimate); 17,849 (2009 census results); 26,293 (1999 census results).

Elmira Abdrazakova, born in the above Kazakh district, was crowned Miss Russia 2013, representing her adopted country at the Miss World and Miss Universe pageants that took place the same year.

== Geography ==
Lakes Zharagash and Kyzyltuz are located in the district, close to the Kazakhstan-Russia border.
