= Barabinsky District =

Barabinsky District Барабинский район (Russian)
- District
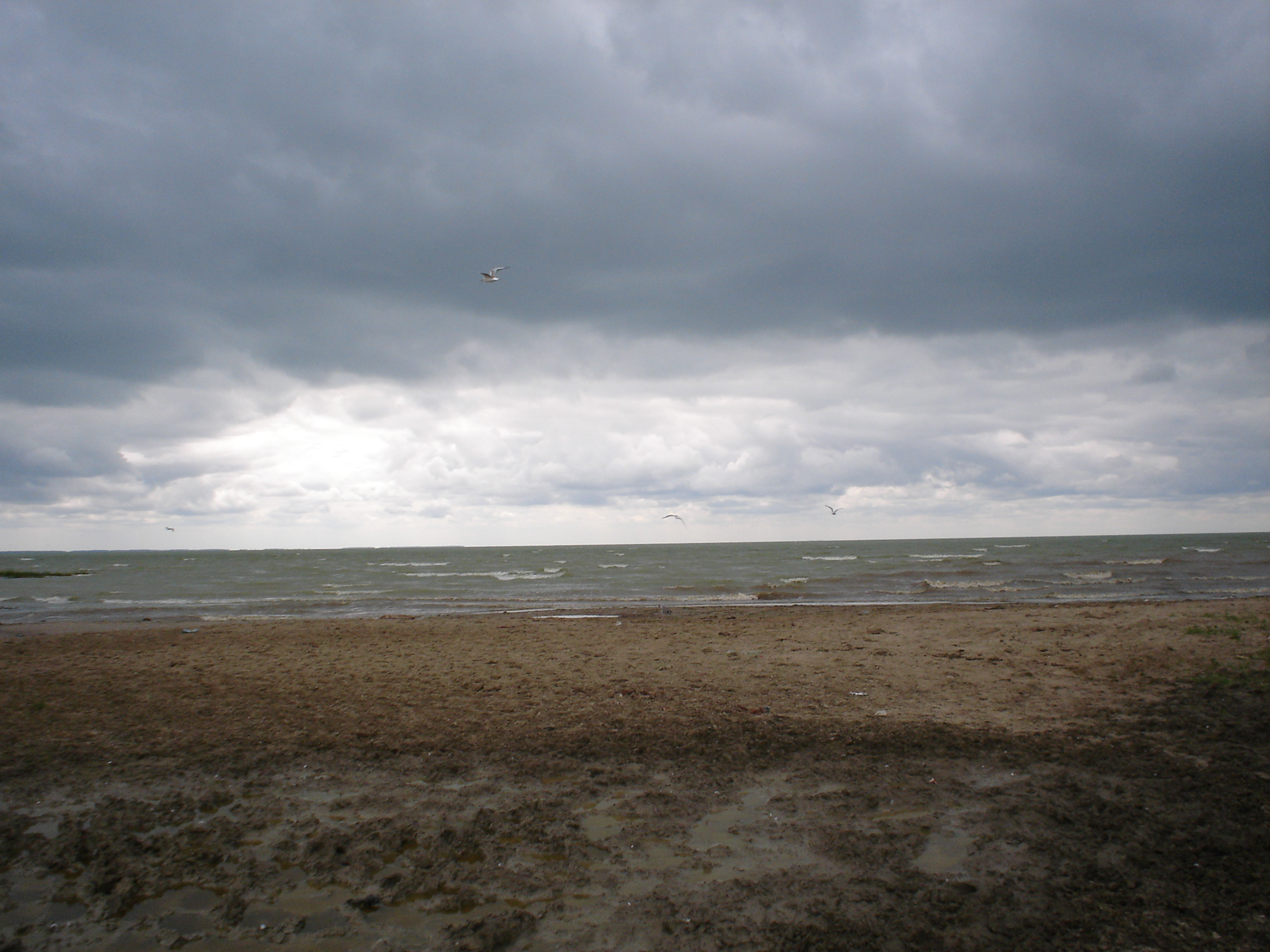
- Lake Sartlan, Barabinsky District

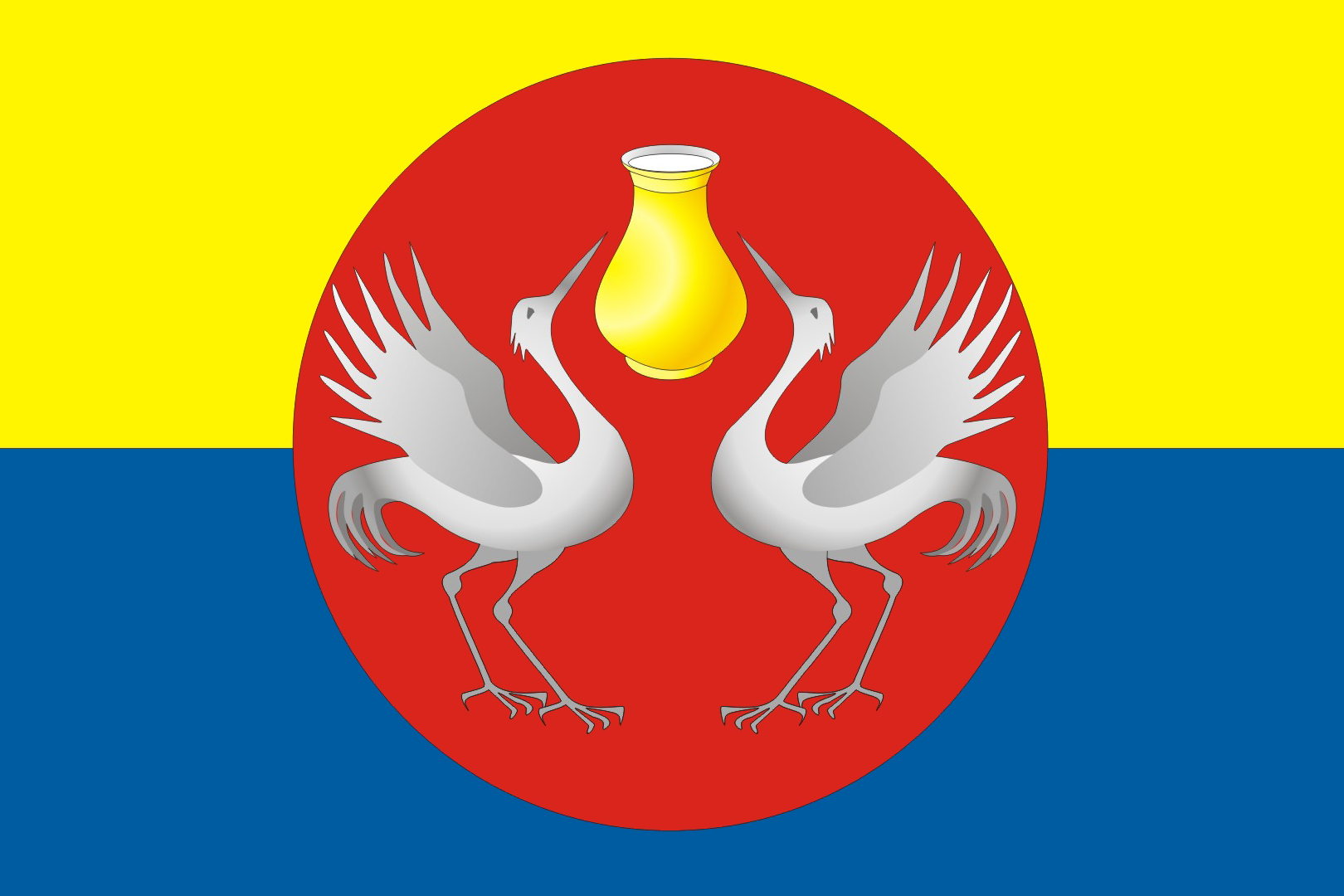
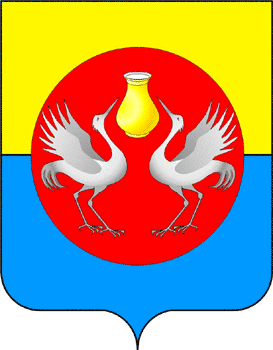
- Flag Coat of arms
- Location of Barabinsky District in Novosibirsk Oblast
- Coordinates: 55°21′N 78°21′E
- Country: Russia
- Federal subject: Novosibirsk Oblast
- Established: 1925
- Administrative center: Barabinsk

Area
  - Total: 5,400 km^{2} (2,100 sq mi)

Population (2010 Census)
  - Total: 14,169
  - Density: 2.6/km^{2} (6.8/sq mi)
  - Urban: 0%
  - Rural: 100%

Administrative structure
  - Inhabited localities: 51 rural localities

Municipal structure
  - Municipally incorporated as: Barabinsky Municipal District
  - Municipal divisions: 1 urban settlements, 11 rural settlements
- Time zone: UTC+7 (MSK+4)
- OKTMO ID: 50604000
- Website: https://admbaraba.nso.ru/

Barabinsky District (Russian: Бара́бинский райо́н) is an administrative and municipal district (raion), one of the thirty in Novosibirsk Oblast, Russia. Its administrative center is the town of Barabinsk (which is not administratively a part of the district). Population: 14,169 (2010 Census); 17,126 (2002 census); 18,279 (1989 Soviet census).

== Geography ==
The district is located in the western central part of the oblast. The area of the district is 5,400 square kilometers (2,100 sq mi). Lakes Chany, Sartlan and Tandovo lie in the district.

== Administrative and municipal status ==
Within the framework of administrative divisions, Barabinsky District is one of the thirty in the oblast. The town of Barabinsk serves as its administrative center, despite being incorporated separately as an administrative unit with the status equal to that of the districts.

As a municipal division, the district is incorporated as Barabinsky Municipal District, with the Town of Barabinsk being incorporated within it as Barabinsk Urban Settlement.
