= Malye Chany =

Lake in Russia

- Малые Чаны
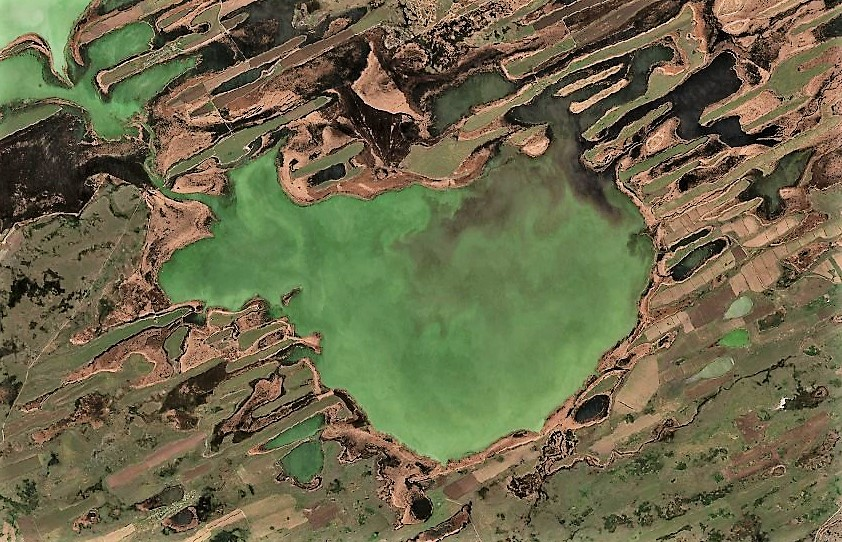
- Sentinel-2 picture of the lake

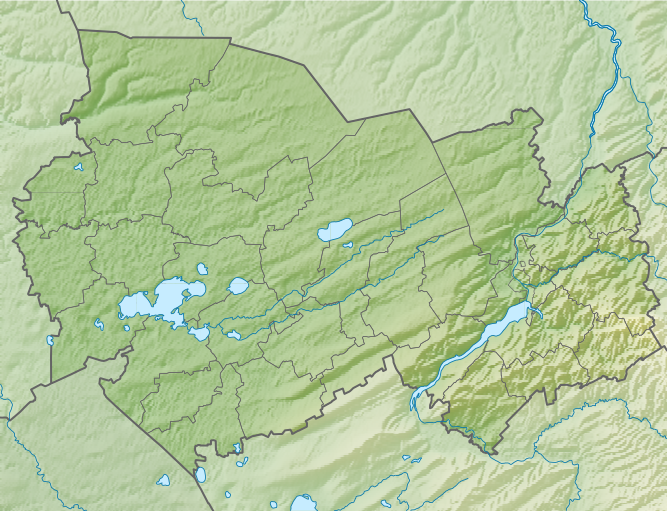
- Location within Novosibirsk Oblast Location within Russia
- Location: Baraba Lowland; West Siberian Plain
- Coordinates: 54°33′00″N 77°58′00″E
- Type: brackish lake
- Primary inflows: Chulym
- Catchment area: 20,100 square kilometers (7,800 sq mi)
- Basin countries: Russia
- Max. length: 21.5 kilometers (13.4 mi)
- Max. width: 12 kilometers (7.5 mi)
- Surface area: ca 200 square kilometers (77 sq mi)
- Average depth: 1.4 meters (4 ft 7 in)
- Max. depth: 14 meters (46 ft)
- Water volume: 0.27 cubic kilometers (0.065 cu mi)
- Residence time: UTC+7
- Surface elevation: 106 meters (348 ft)
- Settlements: Chumashki

Malye Chany (Russian: Малые Чаны – Little Chany) is a lake in Kupinsky and Zdvinsky districts, Novosibirsk Oblast, Russian Federation.

Chumashki village is located 7.5 kilometers (4.7 mi) to the southwest of the lake and Novorozino 5 kilometers (3.1 mi) to the north of the northern lakeshore.

== Geography ==
Malye Chany is part of the Baraba Lowland, West Siberian Plain. It lies in the southern part of the Ob-Irtysh interfluve. The Chulym river enters the lake from the eastern shore. In the northwestern corner there is the Kozhurla Sound (Протока Кожурла), a narrow 3.5 kilometers (2.2 mi) long channel connecting with Lake Chany to the north. Lake Yarkul lies 20 kilometers (12 mi) to the WNW. The lakeshore is irregular, with deep inlets in the northeast. Malye Chany freezes in late October or early November and thaws in late April or early May.

There are seasonal fluctuations in the lake level, with the surface reaching a maximum of approximately 200 square kilometers (77 sq mi) and a minimum of 190 square kilometers (73 sq mi). The lake water is less saline than the water of Lake Chany, with a mineralization between 600 milligrams per liter (0.00035 oz/cu in) and 800 milligrams per liter (0.00046 oz/cu in), reaching 1,000 milligrams per liter (0.00058 oz/cu in) at low water levels.

== See also ==
- List of lakes of Russia
