= Barabinsk =

Town in Novosibirsk Oblast, Russia

Barabinsk Барабинск
- Town
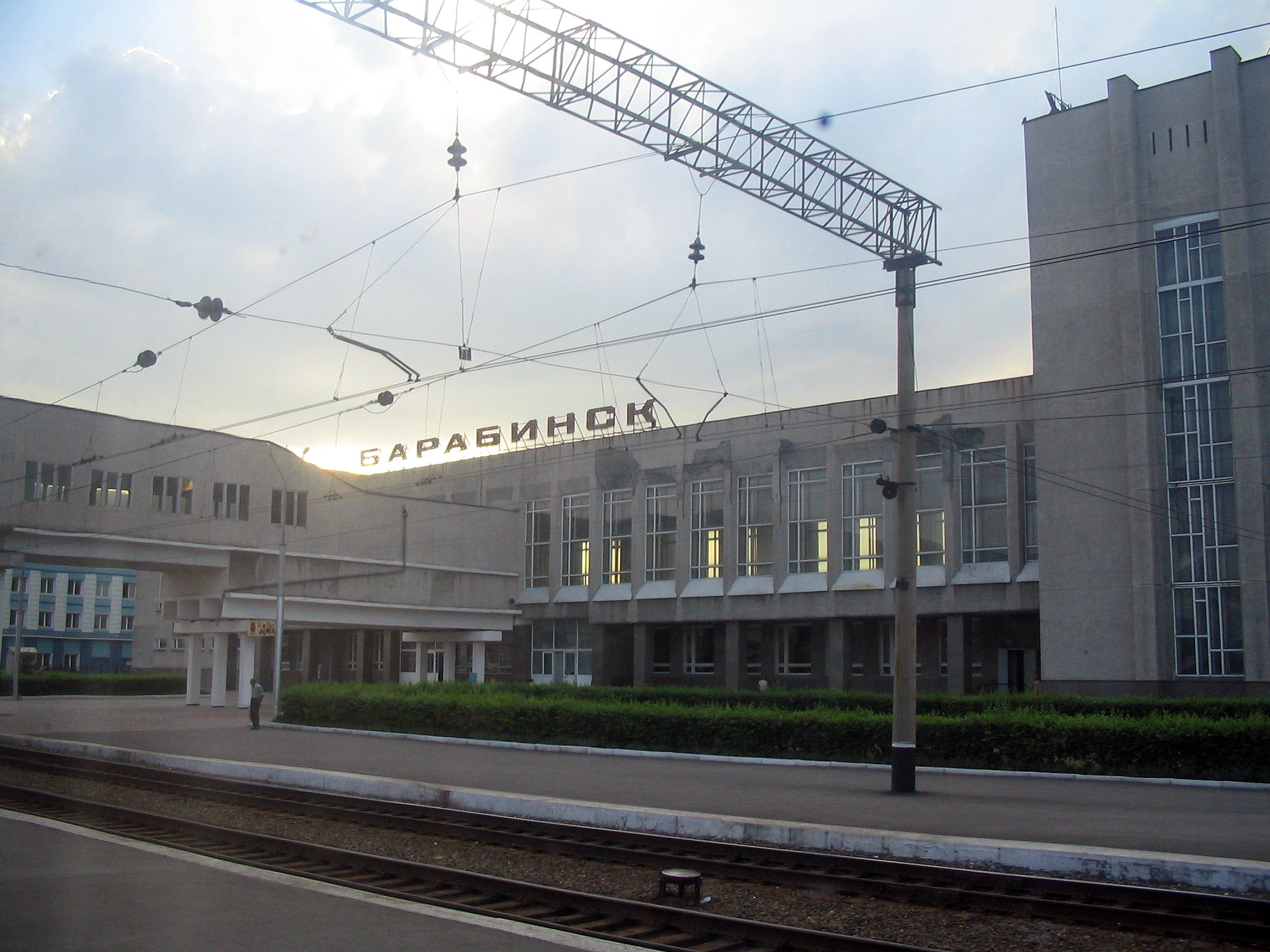
- Barabinsk railway station on the Trans-Siberian Railway

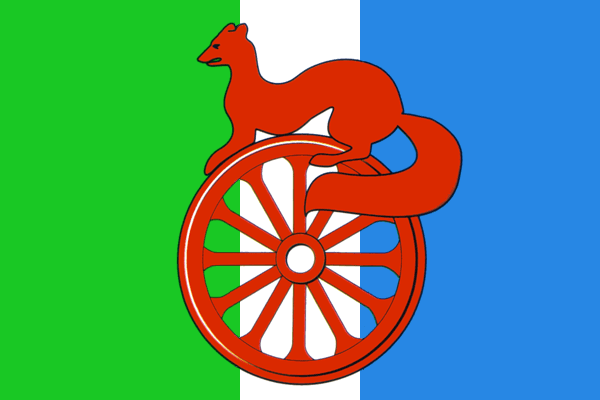
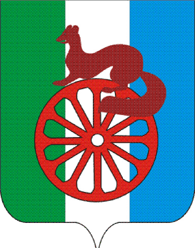
- Flag Coat of arms
- Interactive map of Barabinsk
- Location of Barabinsk Barabinsk (Novosibirsk Oblast)
- Coordinates: 55°21′N 78°21′E
- Country: Russia
- Federal subject: Novosibirsk Oblast
- Founded: the end of the 19th century
- Town status since: 1917
- Elevation: 115 m (377 ft)

Population (2010 Census)
  - Total: 30,394
  - Estimate (2021): 27,648 (−9%)

Administrative status
  - Subordinated to: Town of Barabinsk
  - Capital of: Town of Barabinsk, Barabinsky District

Municipal status
  - Municipal district: Barabinsky Municipal District
  - Urban settlement: Barabinsk Urban Settlement
  - Capital of: Barabinsky Municipal District, Barabinsk Urban Settlement
- Time zone: UTC+7 (MSK+4)
- Postal codes: 630833, 632330—632332, 632334—632336, 632338
- Dialing code: +7 38361
- OKTMO ID: 50604101001
- Website: администрация-барабинска.рф

Barabinsk (Russian: Бара́бинск, Siberian Tatar: Көгүтей-тура, romanized: Köğütey-Tura) is a town in Novosibirsk Oblast, Russia, located in the Baraba Steppe on the Trans-Siberian Railway between Omsk and Novosibirsk. Population: 30,394 (2010 census); 32,501 (2002 census); 36,501 (1989 Soviet census).

== History ==
The town of Barabinsk is named after Baraba Tatars, the indigenous inhabitants of the Baraba steppe. During the construction of the Trans-Siberian Railway, the swampy terrain forced the railway line to be laid away from the town of Kainsk. The Kainsk-Tomsky railway station (opened in 1896) was built at the point closest to the town, and a settlement for railway employees sprang up around it.

The settlement developed rapidly, and in 1911 a project was proposed to create a town called Alexeyevsk based on the station settlement, whose population had already reached 4,000 by that time. At a meeting of the provincial board for peasant affairs held on 18 March 1911, it was resolved that "the settlement at Kainsk station is to be recognised as subject to conversion into a non-district town with simplified administration"; however, for reasons that are not entirely clear, the change in status did not occur. It was only towards the end of 1916 that the settlement at Kainsk station became a non-district town of Tomsk Governorate, named Barabinsk after its location on the Baraba Lowland.

In 1920, the first issue of the newspaper Barabinsky Vestnik was published, then called Izvestiya of the Barabinsk Revolutionary Committee.

In 1925, following the formation of Siberian Krai, Kainsk Uyezd was abolished and Barabinsk Okrug was established. The relocation of administrative structures from Kainsk to Barabinsk led to significant population growth: whereas on 1 January 1927 the population of Barabinsk was 9,757, by 1930 the town already had 15,081 residents.

On 30 June 1930, West Siberian Krai was formed, and on 10 August of the same year Barabinsk Okrug was dissolved and Barabinsk District was established, incorporating the town of Kainsk as well. In 1937, Novosibirsk Oblast was formed, and Barabinsk District became part of it.

By the Decree of the Presidium of the Supreme Soviet of the RSFSR No. 43/101 of 9 February 1944, Barabinsk was assigned to the category of towns under oblast jurisdiction. In 1957, the settlement of Novopokrovka from Novogutovsky Village Council was incorporated into its boundaries. In 1963, the village of Novochernovaya from Kozlovsky State Farm was also absorbed into the town limits.

== Administrative and municipal status ==
Within the framework of administrative divisions, Barabinsk serves as the administrative center of Barabinsky District, even though it is not a part of it. As an administrative division, it is incorporated separately as the Town of Barabinsk—an administrative unit with the status equal to that of the districts. As a municipal division, the Town of Barabinsk is incorporated within Barabinsky Municipal District as Barabinsk Urban Settlement.

== Economy ==
Industry

The first industrial enterprise in Barabinsk was a garment factory, opened in 1937. Its first director was Stepan Yatsko.

In August 1958, Plant No. 3 of the USSR Ministry of Communications began operations; from 1959, under the State Plan for development, the plant started undergoing reconstruction. The plant manufactured equipment for postal communications. In accordance with a resolution of the USSR Council of Ministers, in 1966 the state union plant was given a new name — the Barabinsk Union Plant Promsvyaz. In 1992, the plant was reorganised into the open joint-stock company Svyazist, and since August 2012 it has been the limited liability company Zavod Sibpromsvyaz.

Other enterprises:

· Compound Feed Plant · Dairy Plant · Baraba Production Association · Barabinsky Food Processing Plant (closed joint-stock company) · Barabinskiye Myasoprodukty (Barabinsk Meat Products, LLC) · Zhivoye Pivo (Live Beer, LLC)

Trading enterprises

== Climate ==
Barabinsk has a humid continental climate (Köppen climate classification Dfb), with very cold winters and warm summers. Precipitation is quite low, but is somewhat higher from June to September than at other times of the year.

Climate data for Barabinsk
| Month | Jan | Feb | Mar | Apr | May | Jun | Jul | Aug | Sep | Oct | Nov | Dec | Year |
|---|---|---|---|---|---|---|---|---|---|---|---|---|---|
| Record high °C (°F) | 3.5 (38.3) | 3.5 (38.3) | 10.0 (50.0) | 28.3 (82.9) | 36.2 (97.2) | 37.8 (100.0) | 37.8 (100.0) | 35.5 (95.9) | 32.9 (91.2) | 23.9 (75.0) | 10.5 (50.9) | 7.0 (44.6) | 37.8 (100.0) |
| Mean daily maximum °C (°F) | −14.5 (5.9) | −12.7 (9.1) | −5.2 (22.6) | 6.6 (43.9) | 17.5 (63.5) | 23.3 (73.9) | 25.1 (77.2) | 22.1 (71.8) | 16.0 (60.8) | 6.6 (43.9) | −5.1 (22.8) | −11.8 (10.8) | 5.7 (42.2) |
| Daily mean °C (°F) | −19.1 (−2.4) | −17.5 (0.5) | −10.9 (12.4) | 0.9 (33.6) | 10.7 (51.3) | 16.8 (62.2) | 18.9 (66.0) | 15.9 (60.6) | 9.8 (49.6) | 1.5 (34.7) | −9.1 (15.6) | −16.3 (2.7) | 0.1 (32.2) |
| Mean daily minimum °C (°F) | −23.5 (−10.3) | −22.2 (−8.0) | −15.9 (3.4) | −3.8 (25.2) | 4.5 (40.1) | 10.4 (50.7) | 12.9 (55.2) | 10.3 (50.5) | 4.8 (40.6) | −2.3 (27.9) | −13.0 (8.6) | −20.8 (−5.4) | −4.9 (23.2) |
| Record low °C (°F) | −47.9 (−54.2) | −44.9 (−48.8) | −41.2 (−42.2) | −29.5 (−21.1) | −13.0 (8.6) | −3.3 (26.1) | 2.5 (36.5) | −2.2 (28.0) | −8.0 (17.6) | −25.1 (−13.2) | −41.7 (−43.1) | −47.5 (−53.5) | −47.9 (−54.2) |
| Average precipitation mm (inches) | 18.0 (0.71) | 13.2 (0.52) | 12.7 (0.50) | 18.3 (0.72) | 28.3 (1.11) | 49.4 (1.94) | 63.1 (2.48) | 50.9 (2.00) | 33.7 (1.33) | 33.1 (1.30) | 26.6 (1.05) | 22.4 (0.88) | 369.7 (14.54) |
| Average precipitation days (≥ 0.1 mm) | 13.7 | 11.4 | 11.2 | 8.0 | 8.4 | 9.3 | 7.7 | 8.8 | 8.5 | 12.5 | 17.6 | 16.4 | 133.5 |
| Average relative humidity (%) | 80.1 | 79.2 | 76.8 | 63.9 | 55.9 | 66.3 | 72.7 | 73.6 | 71.4 | 75.5 | 83.9 | 81.6 | 73.4 |
| Mean monthly sunshine hours | 79.1 | 130.2 | 182.9 | 234.0 | 289.9 | 313.5 | 316.2 | 257.3 | 177.0 | 108.5 | 67.5 | 60.5 | 2,216.6 |
Source: climatebase.ru (1933-2011)

== Notable people ==
- Irene Nelson (born 1972), Russian pop-rock recording artist, songwriter, producer.
- Anatoly Marchenko (1938–1986), Soviet dissident
- Alexandr Shiplyuk (born 1966), scientist
