= Yudino (Velikoustyugsky District) =

Yudino Юдино
- Village
- Location within Vologda Oblast Location within Russia
- Coordinates: 60°46′N 46°19′E
- Country: Russia
- Region: Vologda Oblast
- District: Velikoustyugsky District
- Time zone: UTC+3:00

Yudino (Russian: Юдино) is a rural locality (a village) and the administrative center of Yudinskoye Rural Settlement, Velikoustyugsky District, Vologda Oblast, Russia. The population was 424 as of 2002. There are 38 streets.

== History ==
On 14 August 1918, the Soviet of the People's Commissars under Vladimir Lenin decreed to rename Krasnaya Gorka to Yudino, after the Russian Civil War Hero Jānis Judiņš- a commander of the Third Latvian Rifle Brigade (part of the Latvian Riflemen, he was killed at the Krasnaya Gorka railway station whilst fighting the Czech Legion and the KomUch People's Army. It was the first inhabited locality, renamed by Soviet power. In the Yaroslavl region, near the village of Yudino Chudino. in Karelia, lakes Chudovo and Yudovo are nearby as in the fairy tale miracle-Yudo

== Geography ==
Yudino is located 3 km northeast of Veliky Ustyug (the district's administrative centre) by road. Kalashovo is the nearest rural locality.
