= Yudino, Gryazovetsky District, Vologda Oblast =

Yudino Юдино
- Village
- Location within Vologda Oblast Location within Russia
- Coordinates: 59°01′N 40°16′E
- Country: Russia
- Region: Vologda Oblast
- District: Gryazovetsky District
- Time zone: UTC+3:00

Yudino (Russian: Юдино) is a rural locality (a village) in Komyanskoye Rural Settlement, Gryazovetsky District, Vologda Oblast, Russia. The population was 3 as of 2002.

== Geography ==
Yudino is located 20 km north of Gryazovets (the district's administrative centre) by road. Khoroshevo is the nearest rural locality.
