= Chistoozyornoye =

Chistoozyornoye Чистоозёрное
- Urban-type settlement
- Interactive map of Chistoozyornoye
- Location of Chistoozyornoye Chistoozyornoye (Novosibirsk Oblast)
- Coordinates: 54.7116°N 76.5826°E
- Country: Russia
- Federal subject: Novosibirsk Oblast
- Administrative district: Chistoozyorny District
- Founded: 1913
- Elevation: 117 m (384 ft)

Population (2010 Census)
  - Total: 6,429
  - Estimate (2025): 5,295 (−17.6%)
- Time zone: UTC+7 (MSK+4)
- Postal code: 632720
- OKTMO ID: 50658151051

Chistoozyornoye (Russian: Чистоозёрное) is an urban locality (an urban-type settlement) in Chistoozyorny District of Novosibirsk Oblast, Russia. Population: 6,429 (2010 census); 6,791 (2002 census); 8,191 (1989 Soviet census).
