= Zhelezinka =

Zhelezinka Железинка
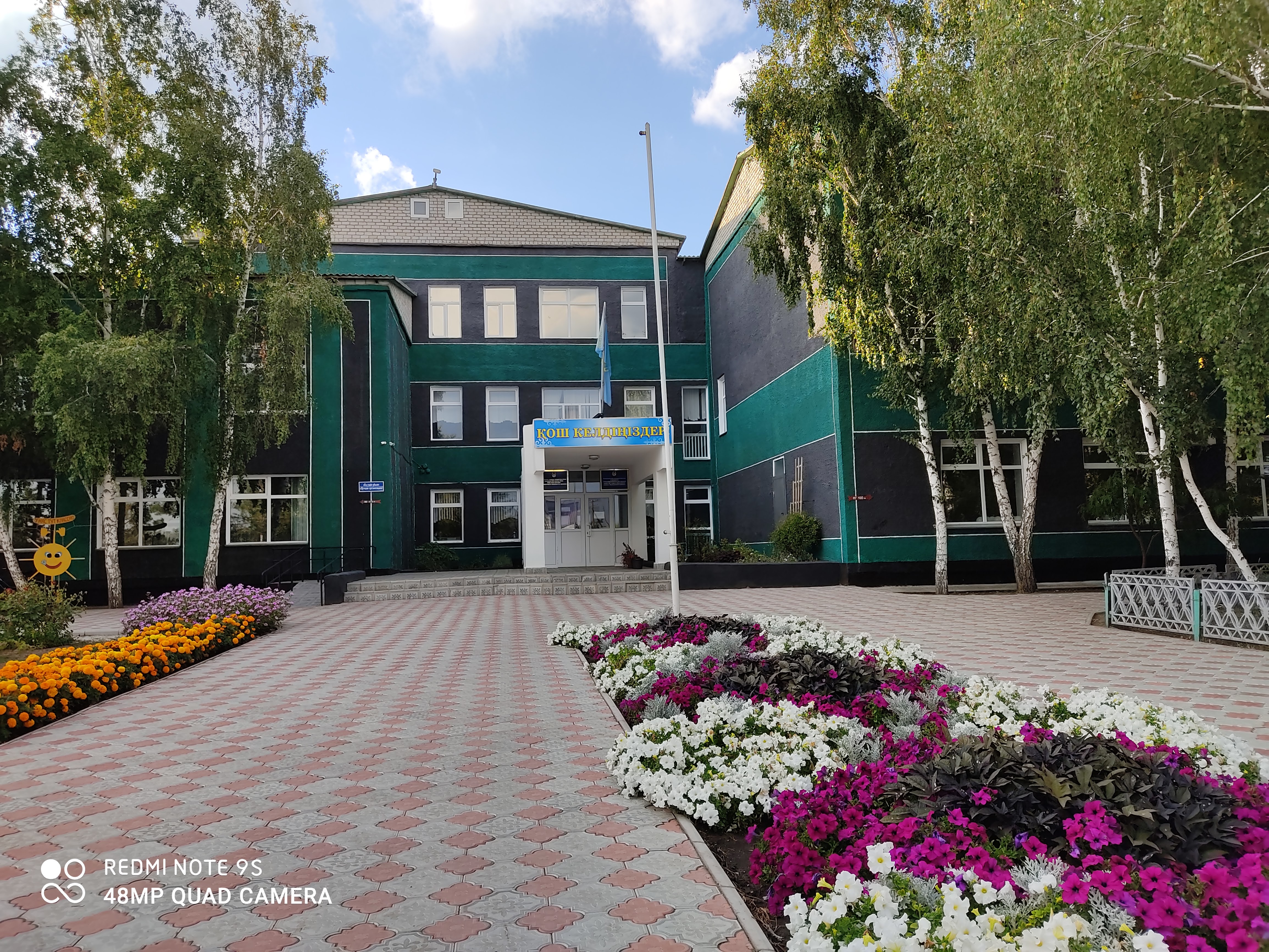
- School in Zhelezinka

- Location in Kazakhstan
- Coordinates: 53°32′28″N 77°18′52″E
- Country: Kazakhstan
- Region: Pavlodar Region
- District: Zhelezin District
- Rural District: Zhelezin Rural District
- Fortress built: 1717
- Elevation: 330 ft (100 m)

Population (2023)
  - Total: 5,415
- Time zone: UTC+6
- Postcode: 140400

Zhelezinka (Kazakh: Железинка) is a settlement in Pavlodar Region, Kazakhstan. It is the capital of Zhelezin District and the administrative center of the Zhelezin Rural District (KATO code — 554230100). Population: 5,190 (2009 census results); 5,956 (1999 census results).

== Geography ==
Zhelezinka lies surrounded by flat steppe close to the right bank of the Irtysh river. It is located 188 kilometers (117 mi) to the northwest of Pavlodar, the regional capital.
