= Bolshoy Bagan =

Salt lake in Russia

- Большой Баган
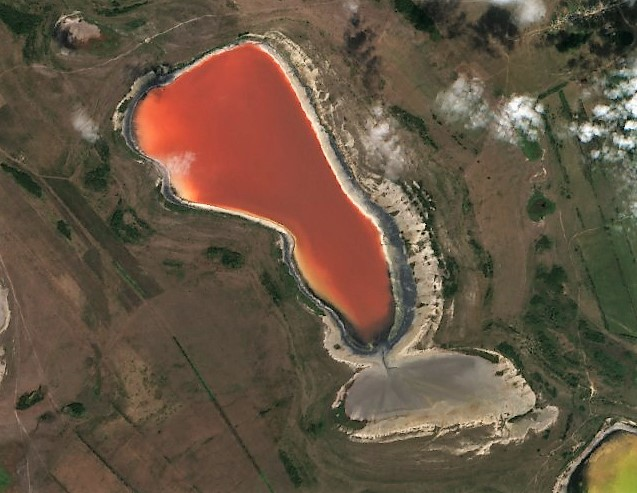
- Sentinel-2 picture of the lake

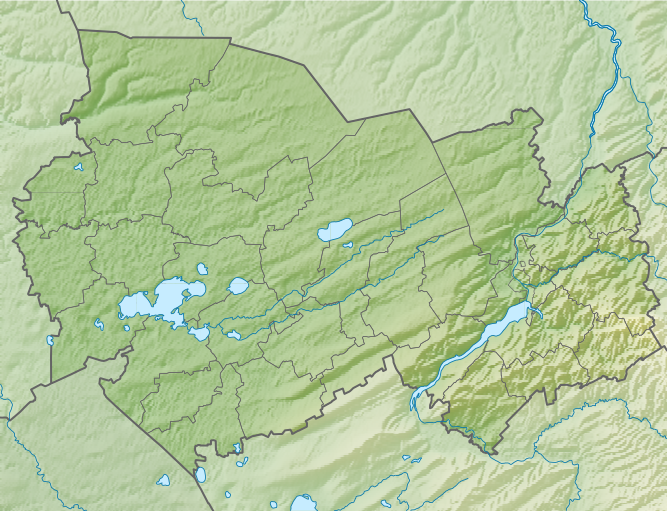
- Location within Novosibirsk Oblast Location within Russia
- Location: Baraba Lowland; West Siberian Plain
- Coordinates: 53°53′54″N 77°07′38″E
- Type: endorheic
- Basin countries: Russia
- Max. length: 4.0 kilometers (2.5 mi)
- Max. width: 2.3 kilometers (1.4 mi)
- Surface area: 5.7 square kilometers (2.2 sq mi)
- Residence time: UTC+7
- Surface elevation: 86 meters (282 ft)
- Islands: none

Bolshoy Bagan (Russian: Большой Баган) or Bagan (Russian: Баган) is a salt lake in Kupinsky District, Novosibirsk Oblast, Russian Federation.

The lake is located at the southwestern end of the Oblast. The nearest inhabited places are Petropavlovka 1.8 kilometers (1.1 mi) to the west of the northern end, Grushevka 3 kilometers (1.9 mi) to the ENE and Terengul 7 kilometers (4.3 mi) to the south. The western lakeshore lies 17 kilometers (11 mi) to the east of the Kazakhstan–Russia border.

== Geography ==
Bolshoy Bagan lies in the Baraba Lowland, West Siberian Plain. It is part of the Bagan river basin. The lake is shallow and has an elongated hourglass shape roughly oriented from northwest to southeast. Attached to the south there is a small salt marsh. It is the largest of a group of scattered lakes located in a treeless, slightly swampy area, to the east of Krasnovishnevoye, west of Kuznetsovka, and south of Ivanovka.

In certain seasons Bolshoy Bagan displays an intense red color. Despite being quite close together, the lakes of the area have different characteristics and even different colors depending from the season. Smaller lake Maly Bagan lies 2 kilometers (1.2 mi) to the southeast, Krasnovishnevoye lies 11 kilometers (6.8 mi) to the southwest and Shulgina 9 kilometers (5.6 mi) to the west.

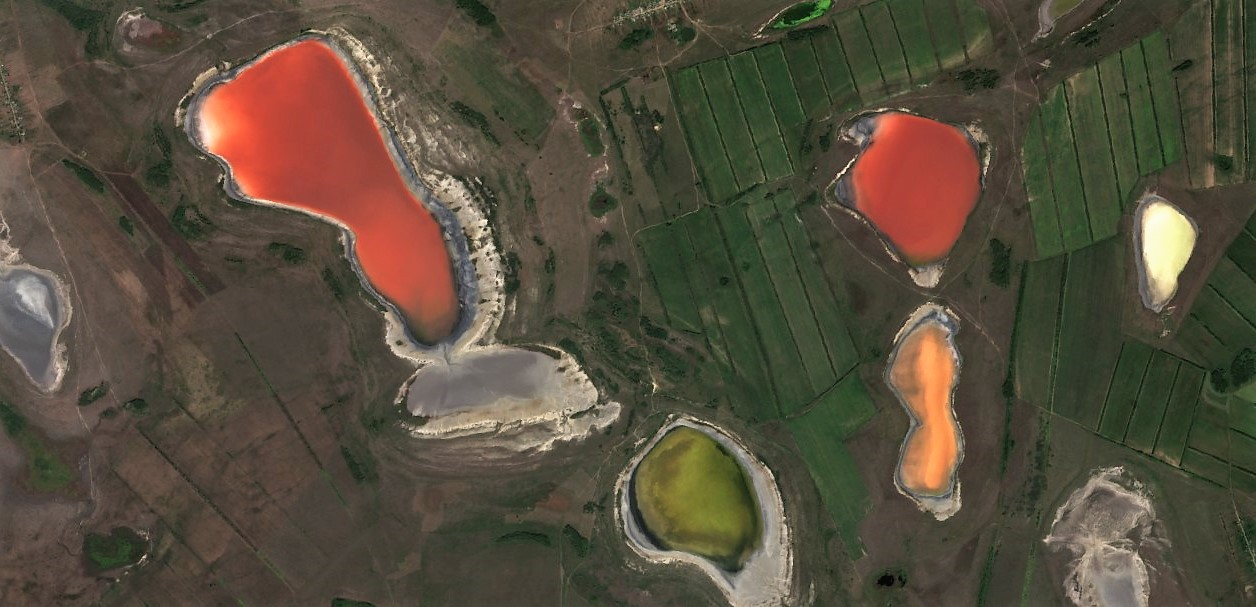
Sentinel-2 picture of Bolshoy Bagan and neighboring lakes.

== See also ==
- List of lakes of Russia
