= Chistoozyorny District =

Chistoozyorny District Чистоозёрный район (Russian)
- District
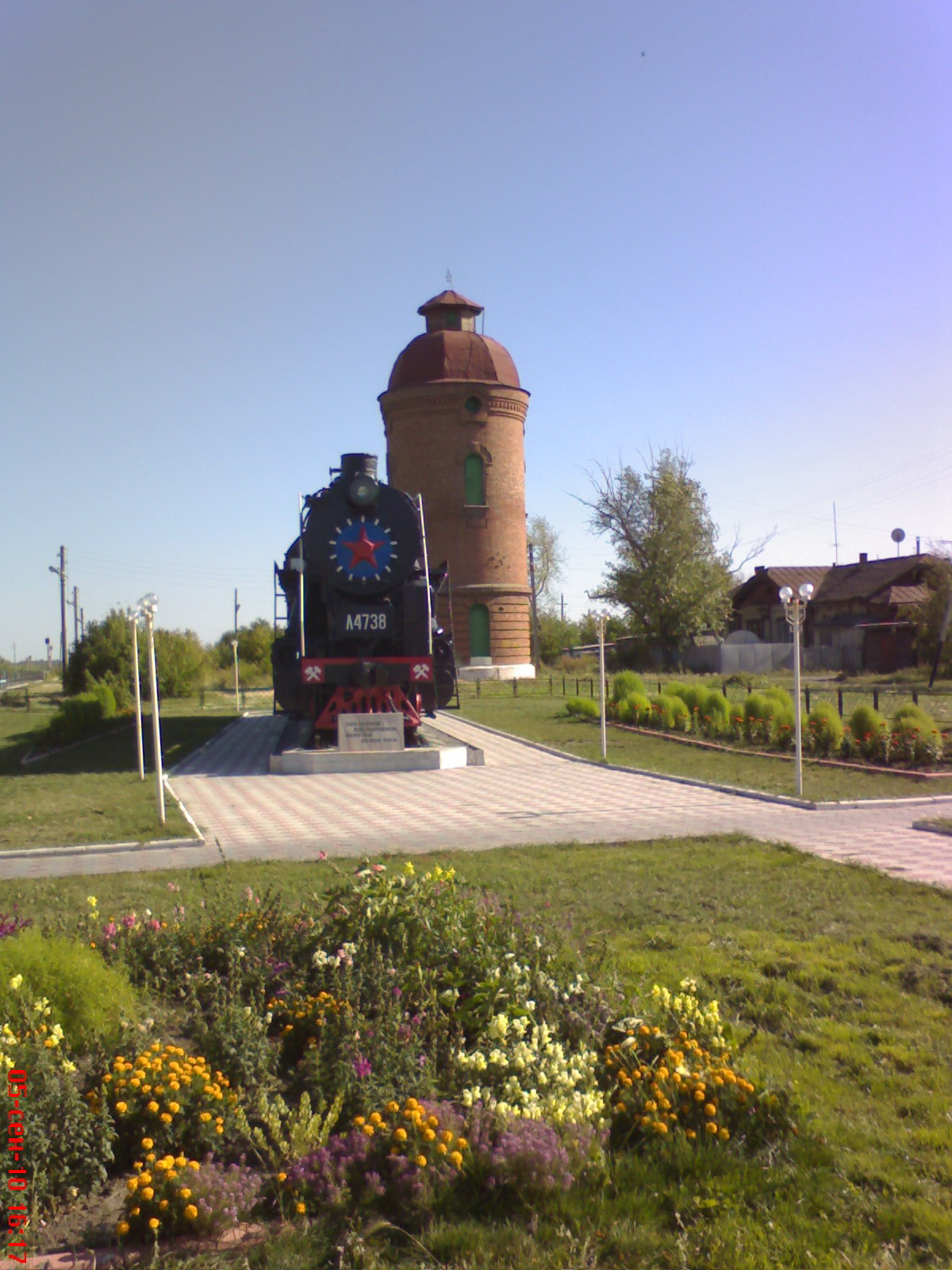
- Water tower and train exhibit, village in Chistoozyorny District

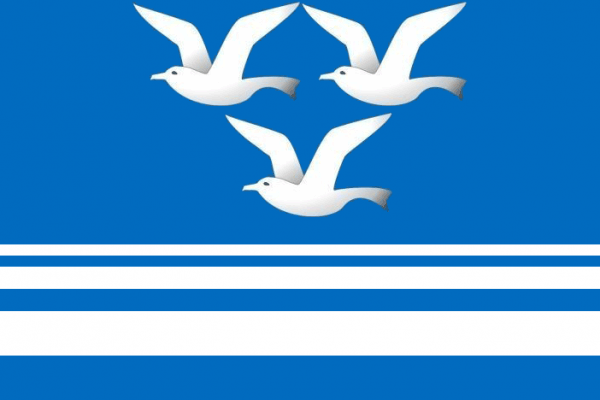
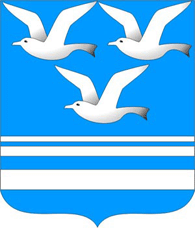
- Flag Coat of arms
- Location of Chistoozyorny District in Novosibirsk Oblast
- Coordinates: 54°42′35″N 76°34′50″E
- Country: Russia
- Federal subject: Novosibirsk Oblast
- Administrative center: Chistoozyornoye

Area
  - Total: 5,690 km^{2} (2,200 sq mi)

Population (2010 Census)
  - Total: 19,603
  - Density: 3.45/km^{2} (8.92/sq mi)
  - Urban: 32.8%
  - Rural: 67.2%

Administrative structure
  - Inhabited localities: 1 urban-type settlements, 43 rural localities

Municipal structure
  - Municipally incorporated as: Chistoozyorny Municipal District
  - Municipal divisions: 1 urban settlements, 16 rural settlements
- Time zone: UTC+7 (MSK+4)
- OKTMO ID: 50658000
- Website: https://chistoozernoe.nso.ru/

Chistoozyorny District (Russian: Чистоозёрный райо́н) is an administrative and municipal district (raion), one of the thirty in Novosibirsk Oblast, Russia. It is located in the southwest of the oblast. The area of the district is 5,690 square kilometers (2,200 sq mi). Its administrative center is the urban locality (a work settlement) of Chistoozyornoye. Population: 19,603 (2010 Census); 22,444 (2002 census); 24,126 (1989 Soviet census). The population of Chistoozyornoye accounts for 32.8% of the district's total population.

== History ==
Yudinsky District was formed in 1925 with its center in the village of Yudino which had been founded in 1686. In 1935, the administrative center was moved to the village of Chistoozyornoye and the district was renamed Chistoozyorny District. The current borders of the district were set in 1965. The Yudinsky Reach (Юдинский плёс) of Lake Chany is located in the district.
