= Lake Chany =

Lake in Novosibirsk Oblast, Russia

- озеро Чаны, Siberian Tatar: Цана күл
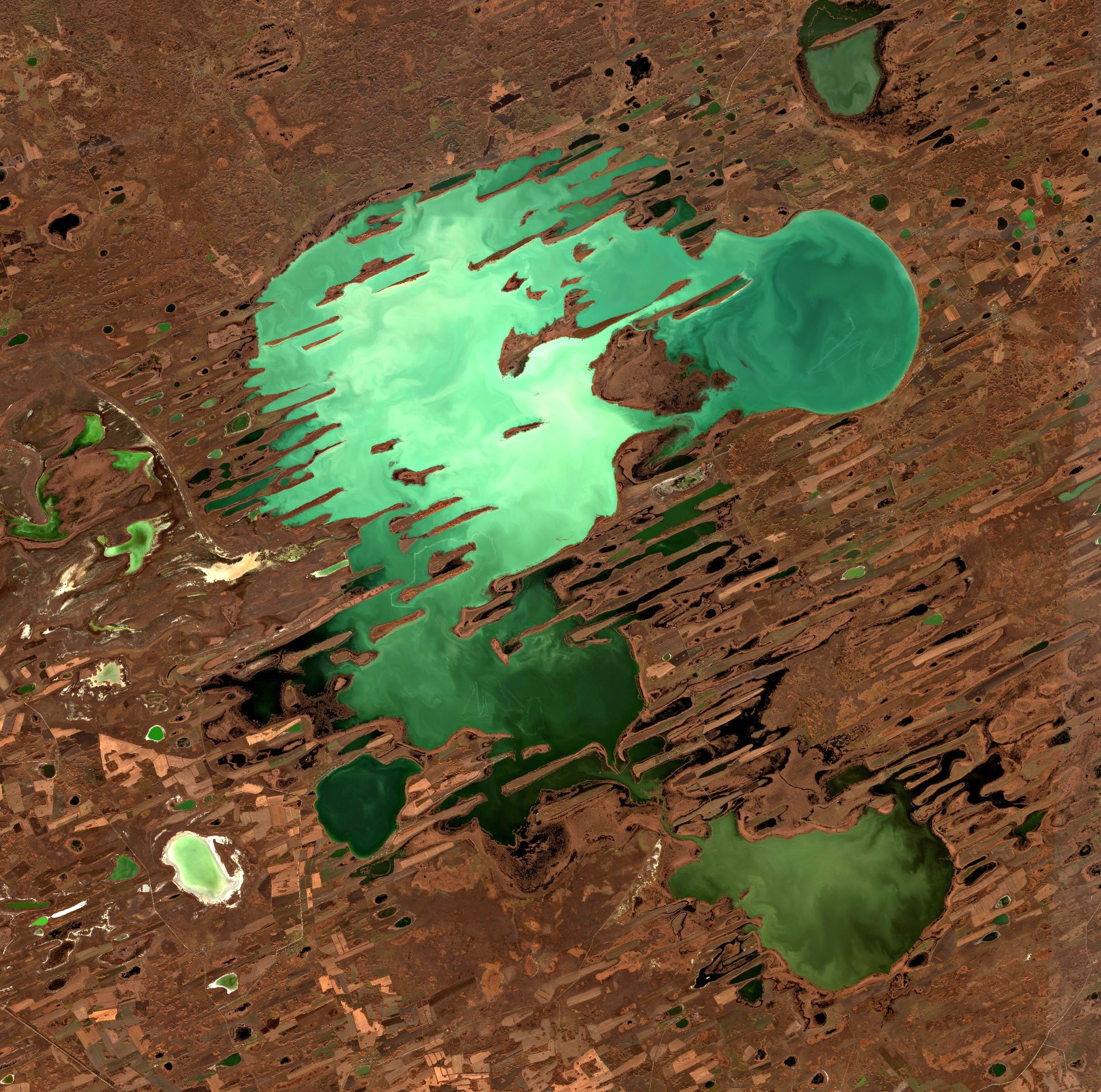
- Eastern part of Lake Chany Sentinel-2 picture, October 2021

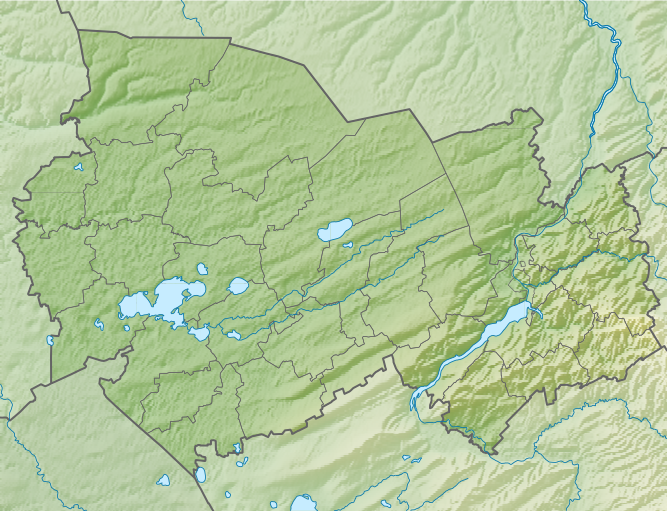
- Location within Russia Location within Novosibirsk Oblast

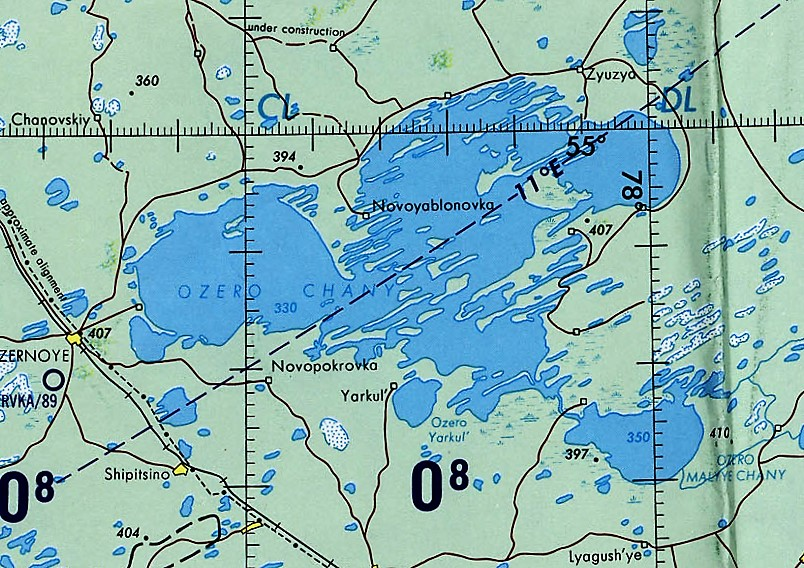
- ONC map of Lake Chany at the time of the USSR, April 1983
- Location: Novosibirsk Oblast
- Coordinates: 54°53′N 77°30′E
- Type: Freshwater
- Primary inflows: Chulym
- Basin countries: Russia
- Max. length: 91 km (57 mi)
- Max. width: 88 km (55 mi)
- Surface area: 1,700 km^{2} (660 sq mi)
- Average depth: 2 m (6.6 ft)
- Max. depth: 7 m (23 ft)
- Surface elevation: 106 m (348 ft)
- Frozen: Late October till May
- Islands: numerous

Ramsar Wetland
- Official name: Chany Lakes
- Designated: 13 September 1994
- Reference no.: 680

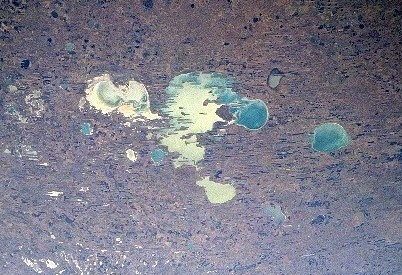
Lake Chany with the Yudinsky Reach on the western side.

Lake Chany (Russian: озеро Чаны, Siberian Tatar: Цана күл, romanized: Tsana kül) is a lake in Novosibirsk Oblast, Russia. The lake extends across five districts of Novosibirsk Oblast: Zdvinsky, Barabinsky, Chanovsky, Kupinsky and Chistoozyorny.

== Geography ==
Lake Chany is one of the largest lakes in Russia. It is located in the Baraba steppe area. The lake is shallow, slightly salty (hyposaline), and has a fluctuating water level, which can change from season to season and year to year. The average depth of the lake is between 1 m (3.3 ft) and 2 m (6.6 ft), reaching a maximum of 8 m (26 ft) in some places. Lake Chany is connected with Malye Chany (Small Chany) and Yarkul lakes to the south. North of its northeastern end lies lake Tandovo. Sartlan lies 20 kilometers (12 mi) to the east, Ubinskoye 130 kilometers (81 mi) to the ENE and Uguy 134 kilometers (83 mi) to the northwest.

=== Yudinsky Reach ===
Lake Chany is a drying lake. The water inflow decreased since the last half of the 20th century because of the numerous dams built on the inflowing rivers. The Yudinsky Reach (Russian: Юдинский плёс), its 800 km^{2} (310 sq mi) western part, has almost dried out. Its surface was formerly more than 30% of the total lake area. Since this zone was evaporating a large amount of water and the level of the lake was sinking, an earthen dam was built in 1972 in order to separate the Yudinsky Reach from the eastern section of the lake. The construction of the dam raised the water level in the eastern part of the lake by 0.5 m (1 ft 8 in). The western part began to dry up and by 1978 the water level in it had dropped by 1.1 m (3 ft 7 in). Formerly the lake surface was between 1,990 km^{2} (770 sq mi) in periods of drought and 2,600 km^{2} (1,000 sq mi) after the melting of the snows in the steppe. Currently the basin of the western part has shrunk and is almost dry, with only residual lakes and marshland. The lakeshore village of Yudino lies on the shore of the now dry Yudinsky Reach.

Studies revealed that there is a risk of the dam collapsing, which would lead to water runoff from the eastern part of the lake flooding the former basin and a negative environmental impact. In 2000 an official decision was taken for the maintenance and overhaul of the dam, and in 2005 funds were allocated from the federal budget for its reconstruction.

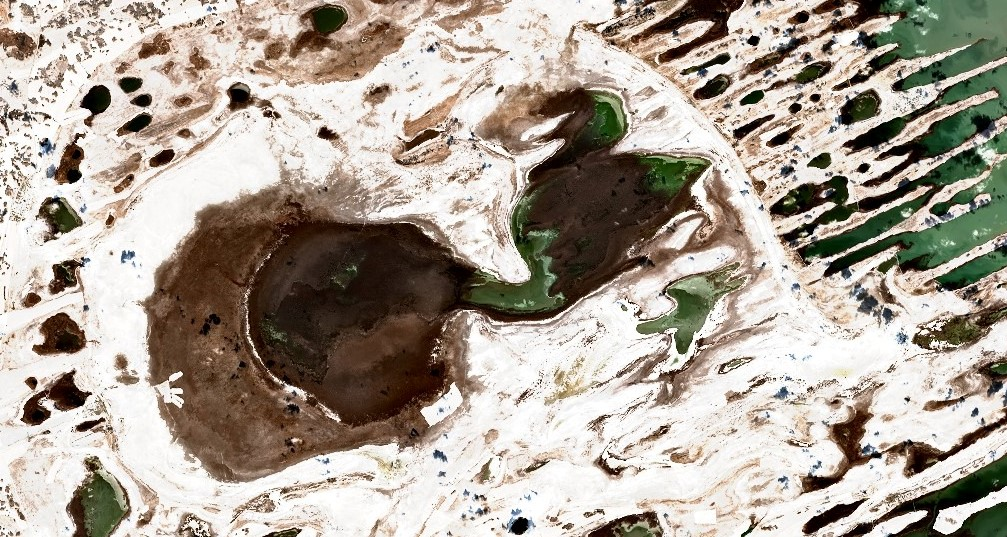
The Yudinsky Reach in 2017.

=== Islands ===
There are about 70 islands on the lake: Amelkina Griva, Shuldikov, Lezhan, Medvezhy, Colpachok, Chinyaikha, Cheryomukhovy, Uzkoredky, Cheryomushkin, Kobyly, Perekopny, Bekarev, Kalinova, Shipyagin, Krugly, Kolotov, Kamyshny etc.

== Climate ==
Severe storms are frequent on Chany, during a powerful wind, high waves occur on the surface of the lake.

== Flora and fauna ==
A variety of ecosystems that surround the lake include a mixture of wetlands, salt marshes, and a mixture of birch and aspen forests. Lake Chany in particular is critically important for the migratory birds of Siberia, and is listed as a Ramsar Site of International Importance. Chebak, pike, perch, crucian carp and Eurasian carp used to live in the lake waters.

== Folklore ==
According to local legend, a giant creature which devours cattle and people lives in the lake.

== See also ==
- List of lakes of Russia
- List of drying lakes
