= Kupinsky District =

Kupinsky District Купинский район (Russian)
- District
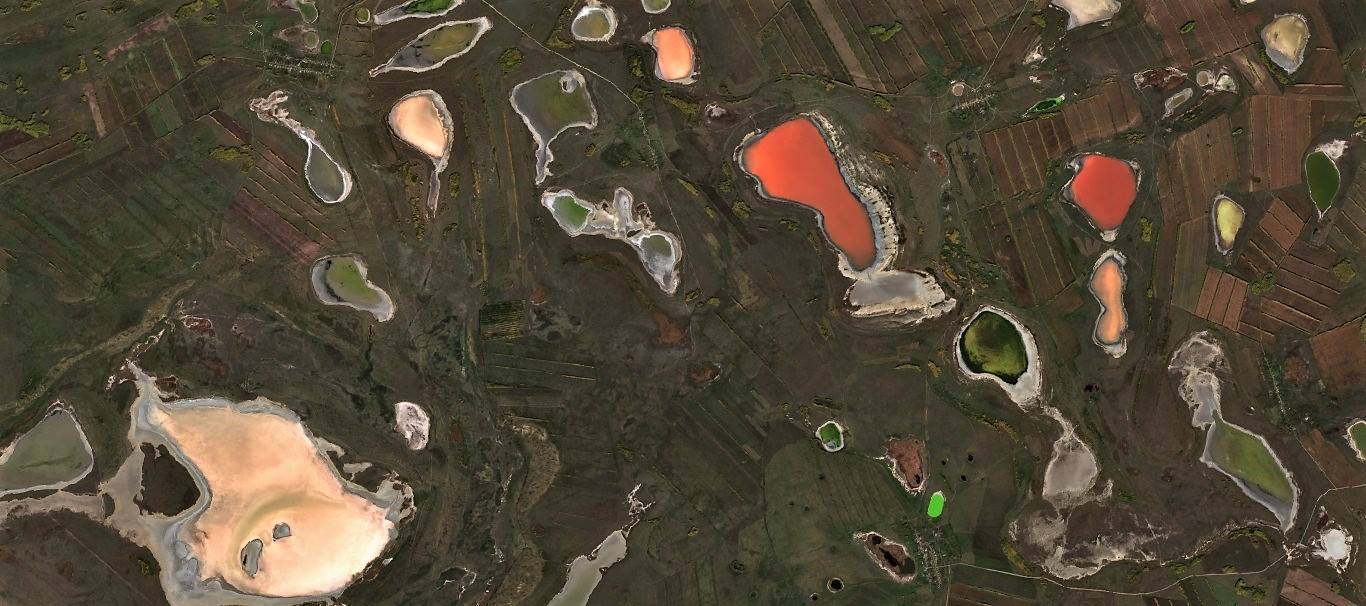
- The colorful salt lakes of Kupinsky District

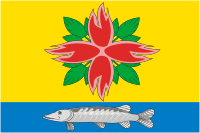
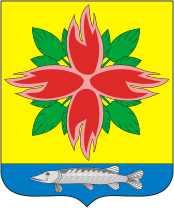
- Flag Coat of arms
- Location of Kupinsky District in Novosibirsk Oblast
- Coordinates: 54°22′N 77°18′E
- Country: Russia
- Federal subject: Novosibirsk Oblast
- Established: 1925
- Administrative center: Kupino

Area
  - Total: 5,809 km^{2} (2,243 sq mi)

Population (2010 Census)
  - Total: 31,199
  - Density: 5.371/km^{2} (13.91/sq mi)
  - Urban: 47.7%%
  - Rural: 52.3%

Administrative structure
  - Inhabited localities: 1 cities/towns, 57 rural localities

Municipal structure
  - Municipally incorporated as: Kupinsky Municipal District
  - Municipal divisions: 1 urban settlements, 15 rural settlements
- Time zone: UTC+7 (MSK+4)
- OKTMO ID: 50632000
- Website: http://www.kupino.nso.ru/

Kupinsky District (Russian: Ку́пинский райо́н) is an administrative and municipal district (raion), one of the thirty in Novosibirsk Oblast, Russia. It is located in the southwest of the oblast. The area of the district is 5,809 square kilometers (2,243 sq mi). Its administrative center is the town of Kupino. Population: 31,199 (2010 Census); 37,451 (2002 census); 40,440 (1989 Soviet census). The population of Kupino accounts for 47.7% of the district's total population.

== Geography ==
Lakes Krasnovishnevoye, Bolshoy Bagan and part of Malye Chany are located in the district.
