= Baraba Steppe =

Plain in Russia

Baraba Steppe Baraba Lowland Барабинская низменность
- Plain
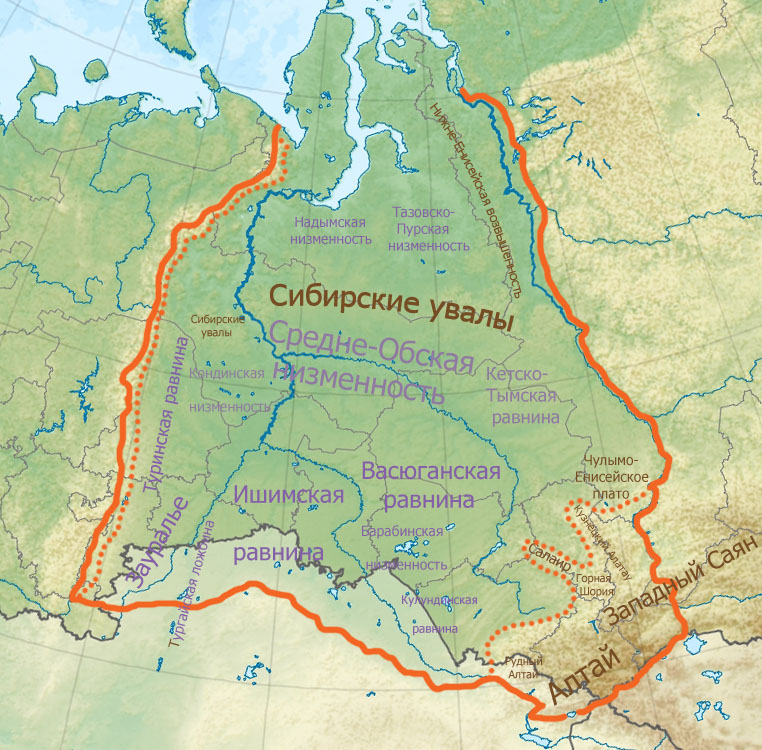
- Map of the West Siberian Plain with the Baraba steppe in the southern part

- Location within Russia
- Coordinates: 55°45′N 78°0′E
- Location: Russia
- Part of: West Siberian Plain

Area
  - Total: 117,000 km^{2} (45,000 sq mi)
- Elevation: 100 meters (330 ft) to 150 meters (490 ft)

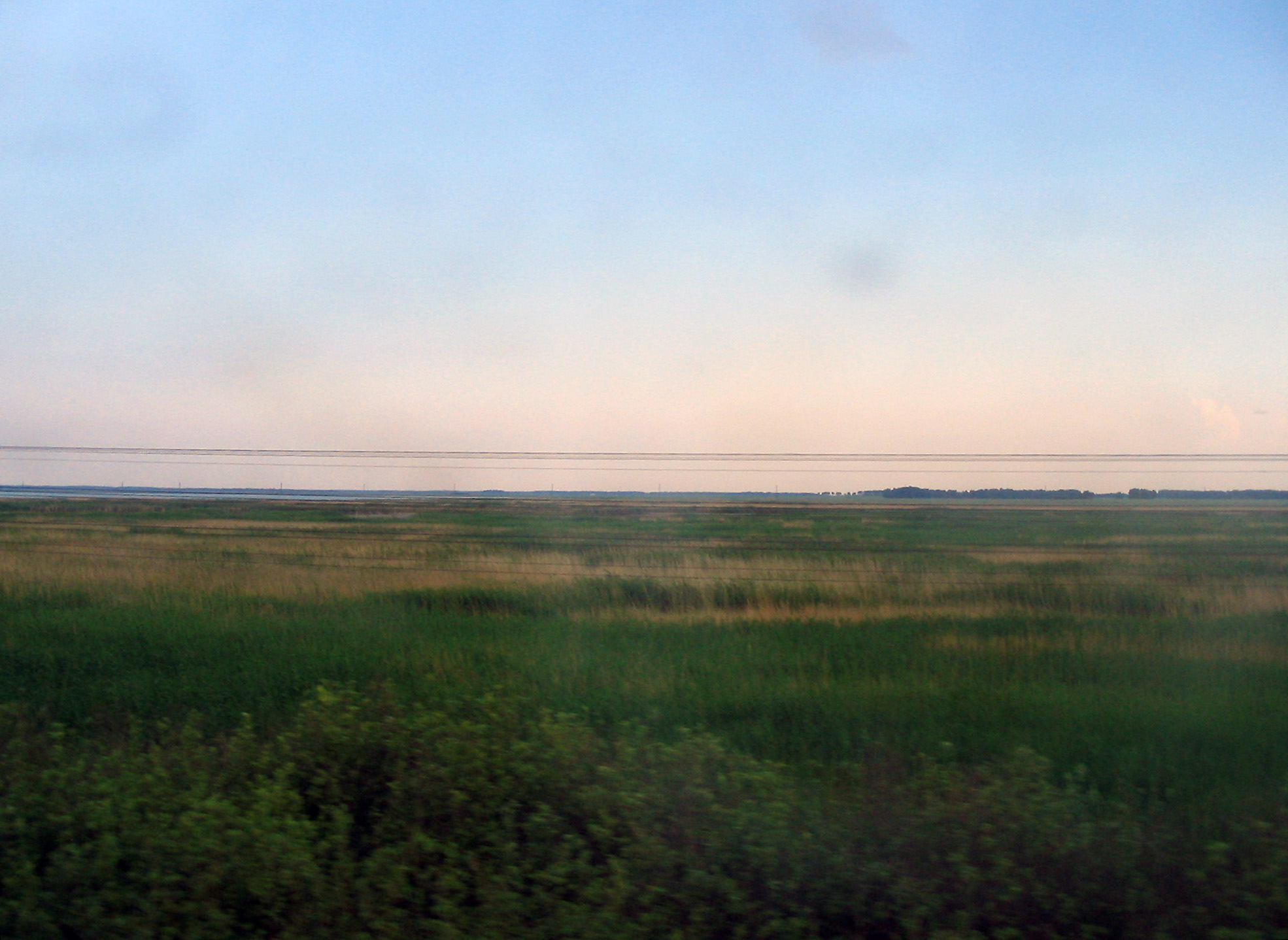
Baraba steppe as seen from the window of the Trans-Siberian Railway.

The Baraba Steppe or Baraba Lowland (Russian: Барабинская низменность), is a plain in western Siberia. It is named after Baraba Tatars, its indigenous inhabitants.

Since the 19th century the Baraba Lowland is an important Russian agricultural region, with its meadows serving primarily as feed base for livestock farming.

== Geography ==
It stretches for 117,000 km^{2} (45,000 sq mi) across the Omsk and Novosibirsk oblasts between the Irtysh and the Ob Rivers. Grassland steppe landscapes predominate, as well as sphagnum bogs and Solonchak grounds, although there are remnants of wooded areas. Barabinsk is the largest city in the lowland.

Lakes Chany, Ubinskoye, Sartlan, Tandovo, Zharagash and pink lake Krasnovishnevoye are located in the Baraba Lowland. The Kulunda steppe extends to the southeast. The border between both areas is not well defined.

== See also ==
- Kurumbel Steppe
- Baraba Tatars
