= Chulym =

Chulym or Cholym can refer to:

- Chulyms, an ethnic group in Russia
- Chulym language
- Chulym (Ob), a river in Krasnoyarsk Krai and Tomsk Oblast, Russia; a tributary of the Ob
- Chulym (Malye Chany basin), a river in Novosibirsk Oblast, Russia
- Nizhny Chulym, a village in Krasnoyarsk Krai
- Chulym (inhabited locality), name of several inhabited localities in Russia
