= Nizhny Uryum =

Village in Novosibirsk Oblast, Russia

Nizhny Uryum Нижний Урюм
- Village
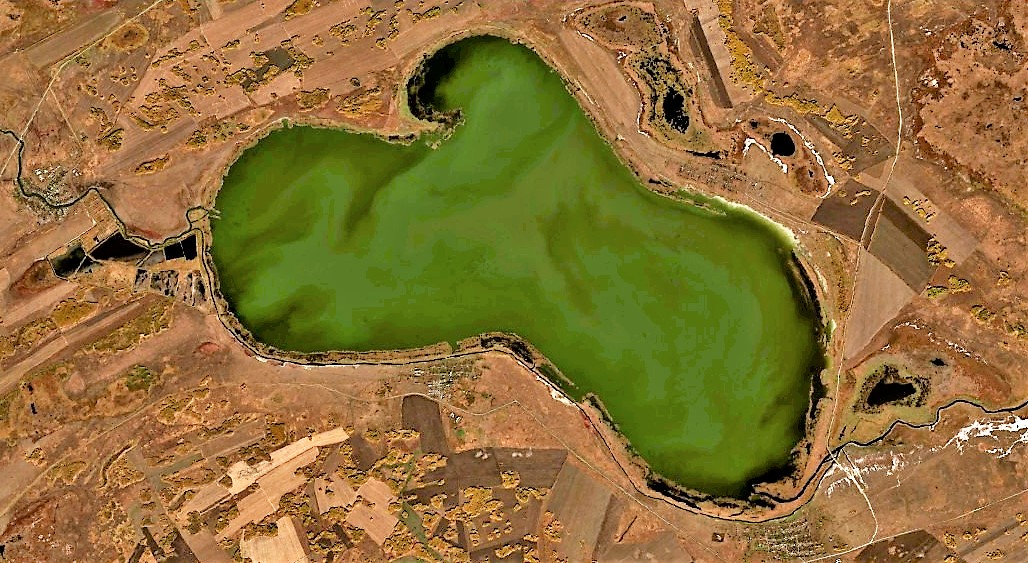
- Nizhny Uryum in the lower left

- Location within Novosibirsk Oblast Location within Russia
- Coordinates: 54°31′34″N 78°28′05″E
- Country: Russia
- Region: Novosibirsk Oblast
- District: Zdvinsky District
- Village Council: Nizhneuryumsky Village Council
- Time zone: UTC+7:00
- Postcode: 632963

Nizhny Uryum (Russian: Нижний Урюм, "Lower Uryum") is a rural locality (village) in Zdvinsky District, Novosibirsk Oblast, Russia. It is part of the Nizhneuryumsky Village Council.

Population: 418 (2010 census); 519 (2002 census);

== Geography ==
Nizhny Uryum lies in the southern part of the Baraba Plain, by the southern shore of lake Uryum. Zdvinsk, the district capital, lies approximately 30 kilometers (19 mi) to the northeast.
