= Chulym (inhabited locality) =

Chulym (Russian: Чулым) is the name of several inhabited localities in Russia.

Urban localities

- Chulym, Chulymsky District, Novosibirsk Oblast, a town in Chulymsky District, Novosibirsk Oblast

Rural localities

- Chulym, Kemerovo Oblast, a selo in Chulymskaya Rural Territory of Topkinsky District of Kemerovo Oblast
- Chulym, Krasnoyarsk Krai, a settlement in Chulymsky Selsoviet of Novosyolovsky District of Krasnoyarsk Krai
- Chulym, Zdvinsky District, Novosibirsk Oblast, a selo in Zdvinsky District of Novosibirsk Oblast
