= Sargul =

Lake in Russia

- Саргуль
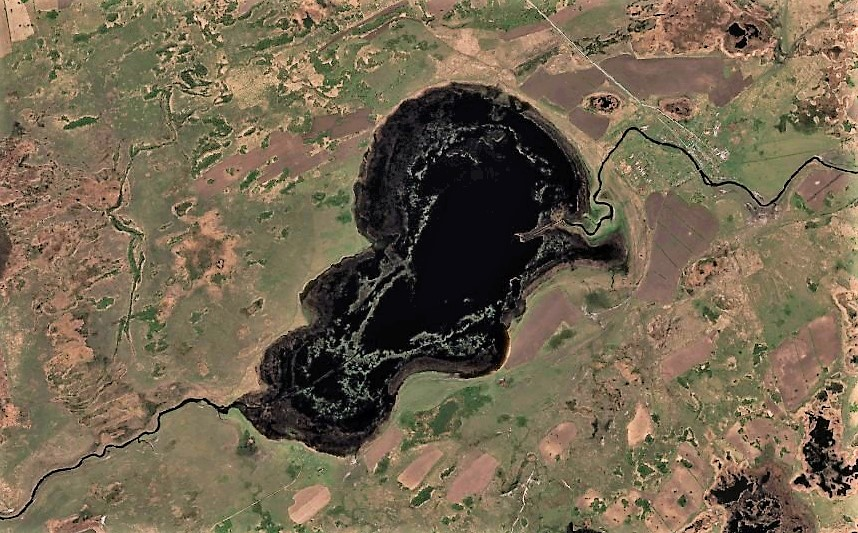
- Sentinel-2 picture of the lake

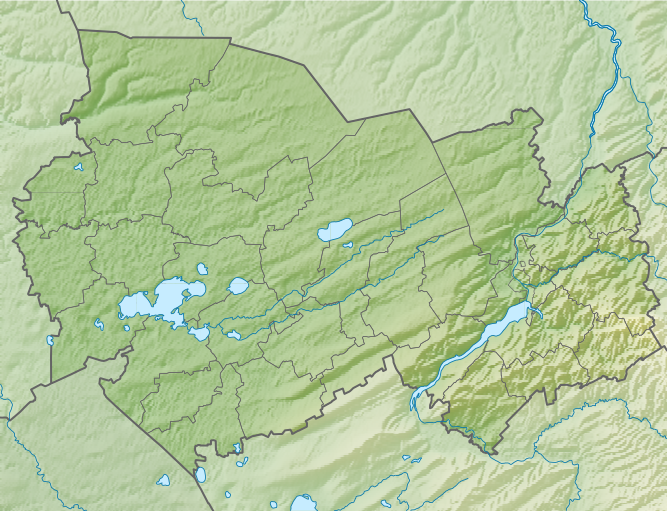
- Location within Novosibirsk Oblast Location within Russia
- Location: Baraba Lowland; West Siberian Plain
- Coordinates: 54°35′49″N 78°51′18″E
- Type: fluvial lake
- Primary inflows: Chulym
- Primary outflows: Chulym
- Catchment area: 9,580 square kilometers (3,700 sq mi)
- Basin countries: Russia
- Max. length: 9.8 kilometers (6.1 mi)
- Max. width: 5.4 kilometers (3.4 mi)
- Surface area: 34.6 square kilometers (13.4 sq mi)
- Residence time: UTC+7
- Surface elevation: 106 meters (348 ft)
- Islands: no
- Settlements: Nizhny Chulym

Sargul (Russian: Саргуль) is a lake in Zdvinsky District, Novosibirsk Oblast, Russian Federation.

Nizhny Chulym town is located by the northeastern shore of the lake and the small village of Aleksotovo at the southern end.

== Geography ==
Sargul lies in the Baraba Lowland, West Siberian Plain. It belongs to the Chulym river basin, located in the southern part of the Ob-Irtysh interfluve. The Chulym enters the lake from the northeastern side and flows out from the southwestern end. Sargul is the next-to-last of the fluvial lakes of the westward flowing Chulym before it ends at Lake Malye Chany; the last one is lake Uryum, which lies about 15 kilometers (9.3 mi) further downstream. It has an hourglass shape roughly aligned from northeast to southwest.

The Bagan flows 17 kilometers (11 mi) to the south. Lake Malye Chany lies 30 kilometers (19 mi) to the west, Sartlan 32 kilometers (20 mi) to the NNW, and Inder 64 kilometers (40 mi) to the east.

== See also ==
- List of lakes of Russia
