= Nizhny Chulym =

Village in Novosibirsk Oblast, Russia

Nizhny Chulym Нижний Чулым
- Village
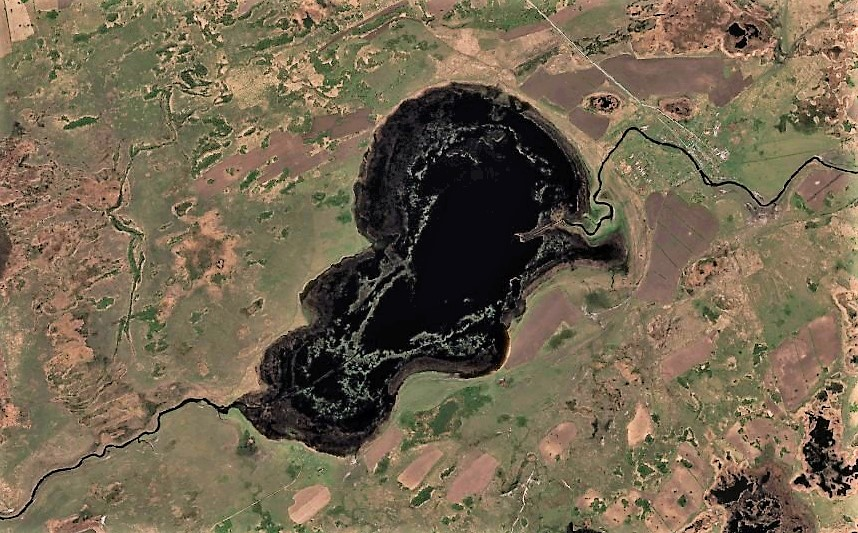
- Nizhny Chulym in the upper right

- Location within Novosibirsk Oblast Location within Russia
- Coordinates: 54°36′55″N 78°56′09″E
- Country: Russia
- Region: Novosibirsk Oblast
- District: Zdvinsky District
- Village Council: Nizhnechulymsky Village Council
- Established: 1773
- Time zone: UTC+7:00
- Postcode: 632958

Nizhny Chulym (Russian: Нижний Чулым, "Lower Chulym") is a rural locality (village) in Zdvinsky District, Novosibirsk Oblast, Russia. It is part of the Nizhnechulymsky Village Council.

Population: 882 (2010 census); 984 (2002 census);

== Geography ==
Nizhny Chulym lies in the southern part of the Baraba Plain, near where the Chulym river enters lake Sargul. Zdvinsk, the district capital, lies approximately 20 kilometers (12 mi) to the northwest.
