= Inder (village) =

Village in Novosibirsk Oblast, Russia

Inder Индерь
- Village
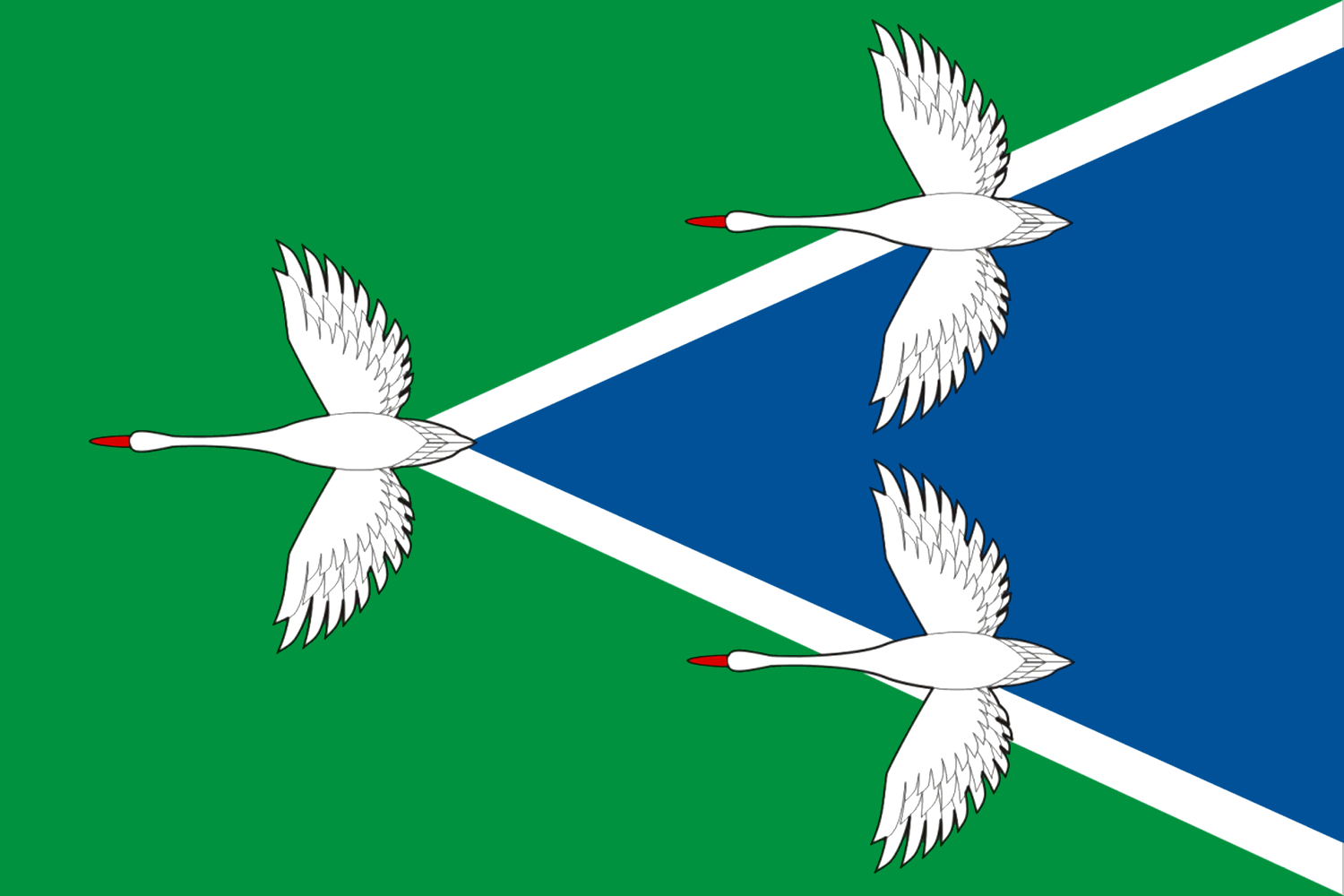
- Flag

- Location within Novosibirsk Oblast Location within Russia
- Coordinates: 54°33′03″N 79°58′32″E
- Country: Russia
- Region: Novosibirsk Oblast
- District: Dovolensky District
- Village Council: Indersky Village Council

Population (2021)
  - Total: 477
- Time zone: UTC+7:00
- Postcode: 632474

Inder (Russian: Индерь) is a rural locality (village) in Dovolensky District, Novosibirsk Oblast, Russia . It is the administrative center of the Indersky Village Council. Between 1925 and 1930 Inder was the administrative center of the Indersky District, present-day Dovolensky District.

Population: 536 (2010 census); 653 (2002 census);

== Geography ==
Inder lies close to the northern shore of lake Inder in the southern part of the Baraba Plain. Dovolnoye town, the district capital, lies 9 kilometers (5.6 mi) to the west of the western shore of the lake.
