= Verkh-Uryum =

Verkh-Uryum Верх-Урюм
- Settlement
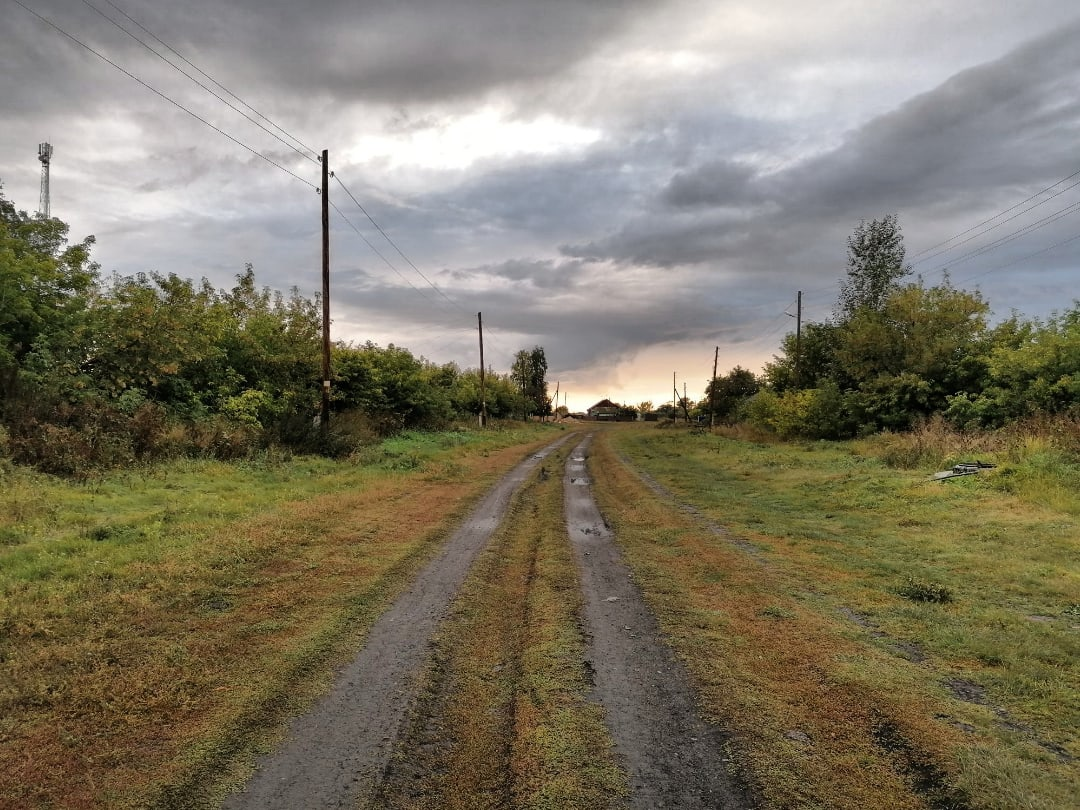

- Location within Novosibirsk Oblast Location within Russia
- Coordinates: 54°29′24″N 78°35′31″E
- Country: Russia
- Region: Novosibirsk Oblast
- District: Zdvinsky District

Verkh-Uryum (Russian: Верх-Урюм) is a settlement (a selo) in Zdvinsky District of Novosibirsk Oblast, Russia. The administrative center of Verkh-Uryumsky Selsoviet.

== Geography ==
Verkh-Uryum is located by the southeastern shore of lake Uryum, a fluvial lake of the Chulym.

== Economy ==
=== JSC Uryumskoye ===
JSC Uryumskoye operates in the settlement. The company is engaged in crop and livestock production.

As of February 1, 2021, the farm contains 1,524 head of cattle, including 550 dairy cows.

In 2020, Gross milk production amounted to 2.8 thousand tons (63% higher than in 2019). The milk yield per forage cow for 2020 is 5736 kg (1474 kg (35%) higher than in 2019).

On February 19, 2021, the first stage of the construction of the farm was completed (300 head of cattle).

The sown area is 8.6 thousand hectares, of which grain and leguminous crops occupy 3.3 thousand hectares.
