= Plekhanovo =

Plekhanovo (Russian: Плеханово) is the name of several rural localities in Russia:

- Plekhanovo, Lipetsk Oblast, a selo in Plekhanovsky Selsoviet of Gryazinsky District in Lipetsk Oblast; 52°38′N 39°51′E
- Plekhanovo, Novosibirsk Oblast, a village in Dovolensky District of Novosibirsk Oblast
- Plekhanovo, Oryol Oblast, a village in Uzkinsky Selsoviet of Znamensky District in Oryol Oblast
- Plekhanovo, Kungursky District, Perm Krai, a selo in Kungursky District of Perm Krai
- Plekhanovo, Usolsky District, Perm Krai, a village in Usolsky District of Perm Krai
- Plekhanovo, Smolensk Oblast, a village in Ashkovskoye Rural Settlement of Gagarinsky District in Smolensk Oblast
- Plekhanovo, Kireyevsky District, Tula Oblast, a village in Podosinovsky Rural Okrug of Kireyevsky District in Tula Oblast
- Plekhanovo, Leninsky District, Tula Oblast, a settlement in Khrushchevsky Rural Okrug of Leninsky District in Tula Oblast
- Plekhanovo, Tver Oblast, a village in Molodotudskoye Rural Settlement of Oleninsky District in Tver Oblast
- Plekhanovo, Tyumen Oblast, a selo in Plekhanovsky Rural Okrug of Yarkovsky District in Tyumen Oblast
