= Kargan (lake) =

Lake in Russia

- Карган
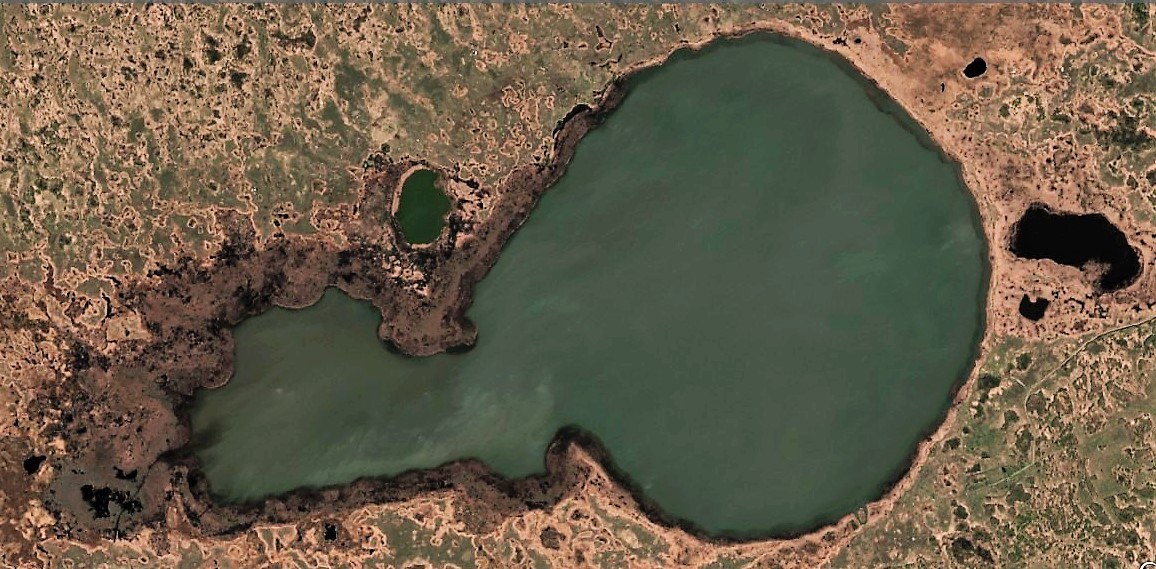
- Sentinel-2 picture of the lake

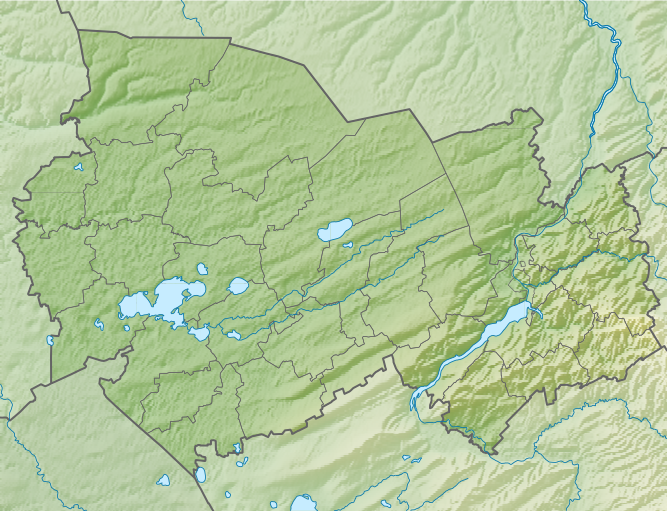
- Location within Novosibirsk Oblast Location within Russia
- Location: Baraba Lowland; West Siberian Plain
- Coordinates: 55°19′53″N 80°17′14″E
- Primary outflows: Kargat
- Catchment area: 149 square kilometers (58 sq mi)
- Basin countries: Russia
- Max. length: 10.5 kilometers (6.5 mi)
- Max. width: 5.6 kilometers (3.5 mi)
- Surface area: 33.8 square kilometers (13.1 sq mi)
- Residence time: UTC+7
- Surface elevation: 134 meters (440 ft)
- Islands: no
- Settlements: Shibaki

Kargan (Russian: Карган), or Karganskoye, is a lake in Kargatsky District, Novosibirsk Oblast, Russian Federation.

The lake is located 12 kilometers (7.5 mi) to the north of Kargat, the district capital. Shibaki village is located near the southeastern shore.

== Geography ==
Kargan lies in the Baraba Lowland, West Siberian Plain and belongs to the Kargat river basin. During floods the lake connects with river Kargat through the Obinek channel. The lake has a larger round eastern part with a diameter of approximately 5 kilometers (3.1 mi) and a narrower and swampy projection stretching westwards for about 4 kilometers (2.5 mi). The shores are gently sloping and covered in reeds and bulrushes.

Lake Ubinskoye lies 12 kilometers (7.5 mi) to the north, Bolshiye Toroki 16 kilometers (9.9 mi) to the ENE, and Itkul 52 kilometers (32 mi) to the southeast.

== See also ==
- List of lakes of Russia
