= Kargatsky District =

Kargatsky District Каргатский район (Russian)
- District
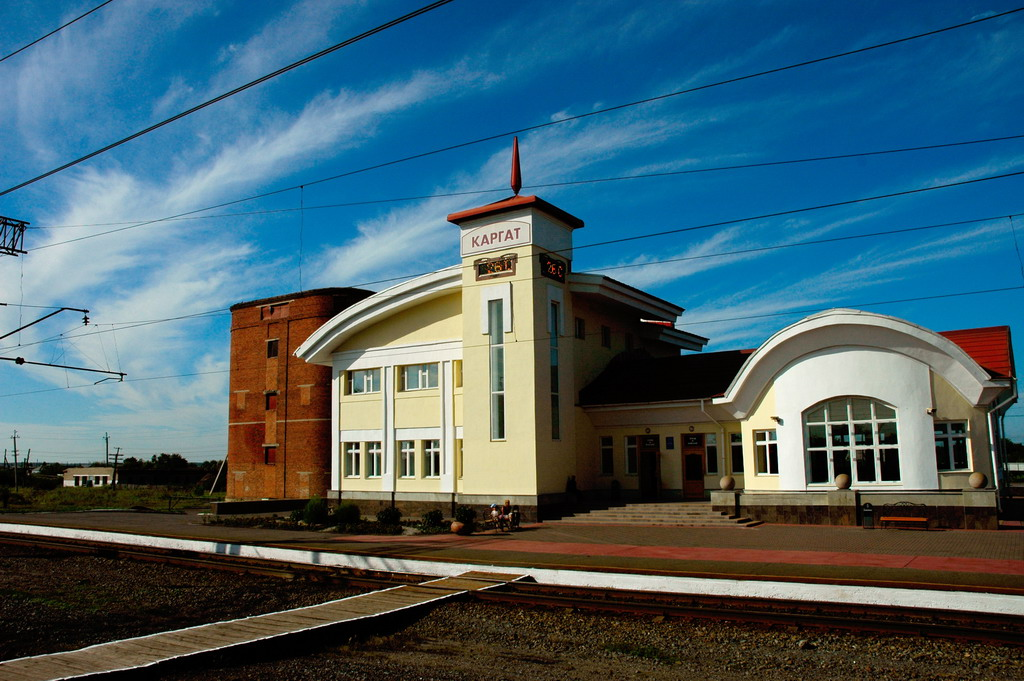
- Kargat railway station, Kargatsky District

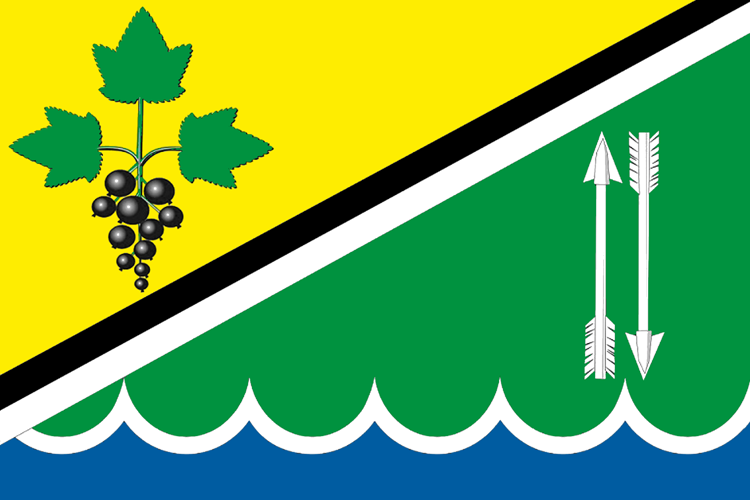
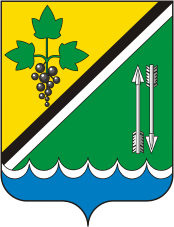
- Flag Coat of arms
- Location of Kargatsky District in Novosibirsk Oblast
- Coordinates: 55°12′N 80°17′E
- Country: Russia
- Federal subject: Novosibirsk Oblast
- Administrative center: Kargat

Area
  - Total: 5,396 km^{2} (2,083 sq mi)

Population (2010 Census)
  - Total: 18,207
  - Density: 3.374/km^{2} (8.739/sq mi)
  - Urban: 55.2%
  - Rural: 44.8%

Administrative structure
  - Inhabited localities: 1 cities/towns, 40 rural localities

Municipal structure
  - Municipally incorporated as: Kargatsky Municipal District
  - Municipal divisions: 1 urban settlements, 10 rural settlements
- Time zone: UTC+7 (MSK+4)
- OKTMO ID: 50619000
- Website: http://www.kargatskiy.ru/

Kargatsky District (Russian: Карга́тский райо́н; Kazakh: Қарақат ауданы, Qaraqat aýdany) is an administrative and municipal district (raion), one of the thirty in Novosibirsk Oblast, Russia. It is located in the center of the oblast. The area of the district is 5,396 square kilometers (2,083 sq mi). Its administrative center is the town of Kargat. Population: 18,207 (2010 Census); 22,025 (2002 census); 25,150 (1989 Soviet census). The population of Kargat accounts for 55.2% of the district's total population. Lake Ubinskoye extends into the district's northwest corner.

== Geography ==
Rivers Kargat and Chulym, as well as lakes Ubinskoye and Kargan, are located in the district.
