= Uryum =

Lake in Russia

- Урюм
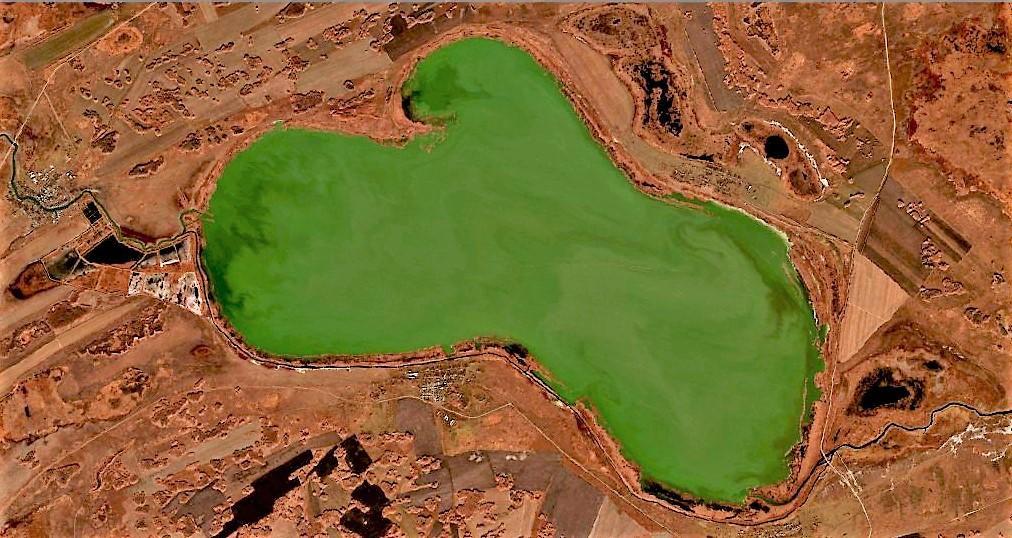
- Sentinel-2 picture of the lake

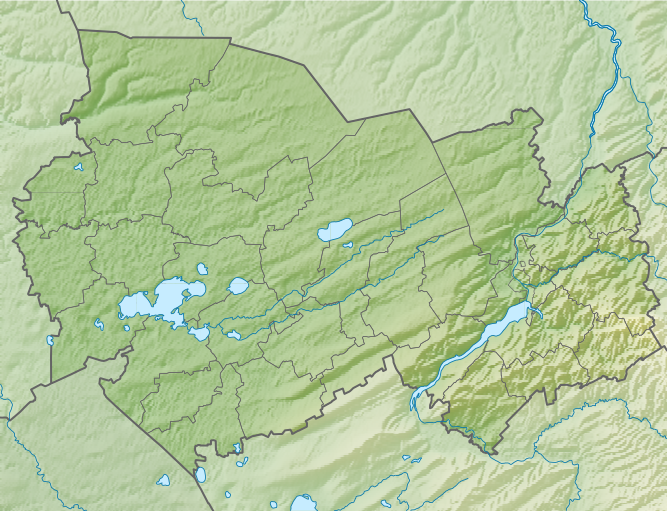
- Location within Novosibirsk Oblast Location within Russia
- Location: Baraba Lowland; West Siberian Plain
- Coordinates: 54°33′12″N 78°30′20″E
- Type: fluvial lake
- Primary inflows: Chulym
- Primary outflows: Chulym
- Catchment area: 10,800 square kilometers (4,200 sq mi)
- Basin countries: Russia
- Max. length: 14.9 kilometers (9.3 mi)
- Max. width: 7.2 kilometers (4.5 mi)
- Surface area: 84.1 square kilometers (32.5 sq mi)
- Residence time: UTC+7
- Surface elevation: 106 meters (348 ft)
- Islands: no
- Settlements: Verkh-Uryum and Nizhny Uryum

Uryum (Russian: Урюм) is a lake in Zdvinsky District, Novosibirsk Oblast, Russian Federation.

Verkh-Uryum town is located by the southeastern shore of the lake. Nizhny Uryum lies by the southern shore, and Mikhaylovka, by the northern.

== Geography ==
Uryum lies in the Baraba Lowland, West Siberian Plain. It belongs to the Chulym river basin, located in the southern part of the Ob-Irtysh interfluve. The Chulym enters the lake from the southeastern end and flows out from the western shore. Uryum is the last of the fluvial lakes of the westward flowing Chulym before it ends at Lake Malye Chany. It has an elongated shape roughly aligned from east to west. The shores are regular and there is a wide bay in the north. About 15 kilometers (9.3 mi) further upstream lies lake Sargul. Crucian carp live in the lake waters.

The Bagan flows 15 kilometers (9.3 mi) to the south. Lake Malye Chany lies 16 kilometers (9.9 mi) to the west, Sartlan 33 kilometers (21 mi) to the north, and Inder 78 kilometers (48 mi) to the east.

== See also ==
- List of lakes of Russia
