= Chulymsky District =

Chulymsky District Чулымский район (Russian)
- District
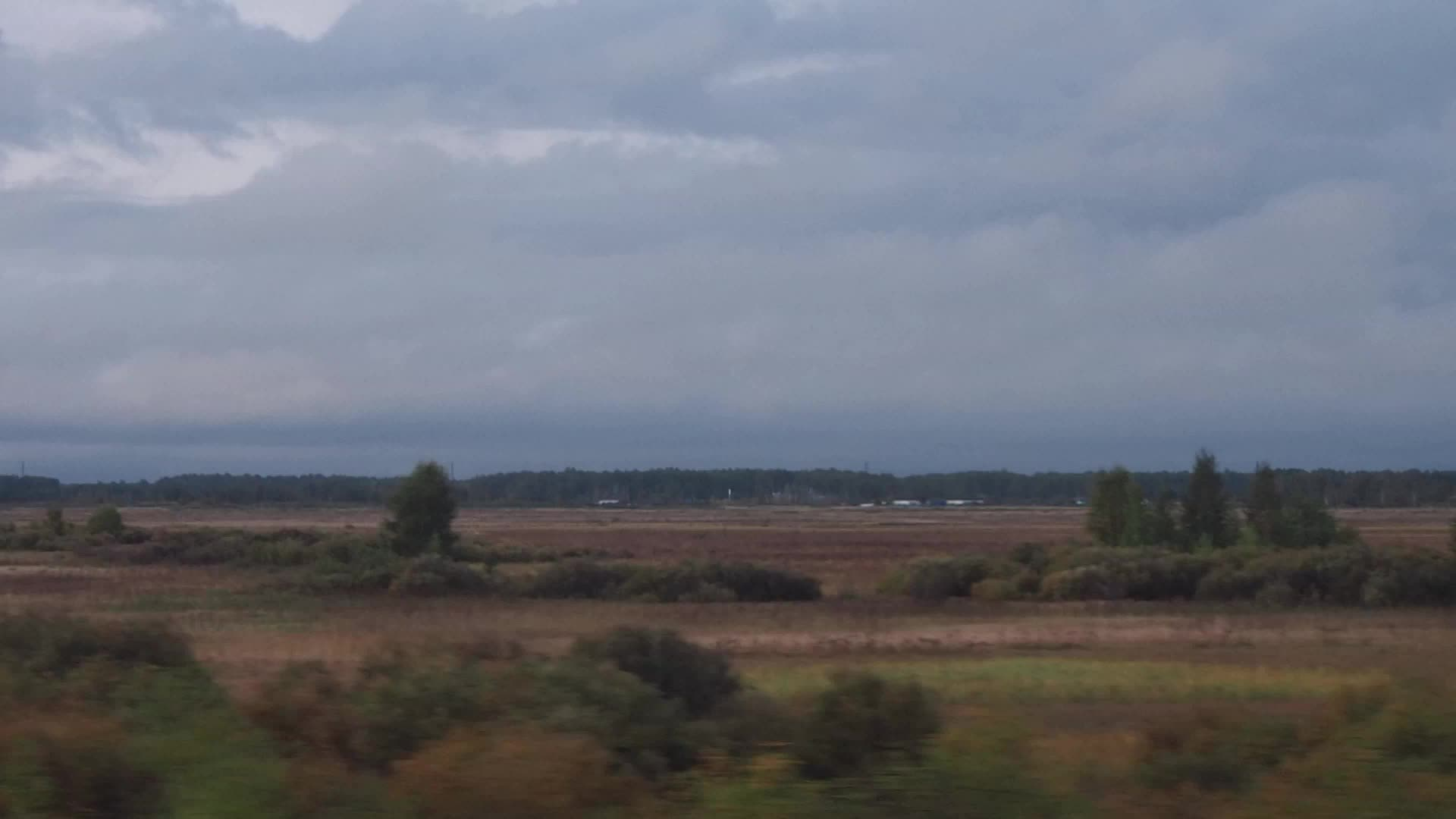
- Landscape in Chulymsky District

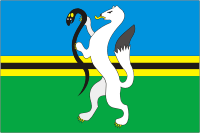
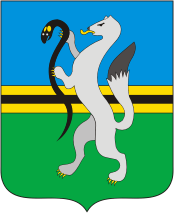
- Flag Coat of arms
- Location of Chulymsky District in Novosibirsk Oblast
- Coordinates: 55°06′N 80°58′E
- Country: Russia
- Federal subject: Novosibirsk Oblast
- Established: 1925
- Administrative center: Chulym

Area
  - Total: 8,500 km^{2} (3,300 sq mi)

Population (2010 Census)
  - Total: 23,909
  - Density: 2.8/km^{2} (7.3/sq mi)
  - Urban: 48.4%
  - Rural: 51.6%

Administrative structure
  - Inhabited localities: 1 cities/towns, 52 rural localities

Municipal structure
  - Municipally incorporated as: Chulymsky Municipal District
  - Municipal divisions: 1 urban settlements, 13 rural settlements
- Time zone: UTC+7 (MSK+4)
- OKTMO ID: 50659000
- Website: http://www.chulym.nso.ru/

Chulymsky District (Russian: Чулы́мский райо́н) is an administrative and municipal district (raion), one of the thirty in Novosibirsk Oblast, Russia. It is located in the center of the oblast. The area of the district is 8,500 square kilometers (3,300 sq mi). Its administrative center is the town of Chulym. Population: 23,909 (2010 Census); 26,763 (2002 census); 31,854 (1989 Soviet census). The population of Chulym accounts for 48.4% of the district's total population.

== Etymology ==
Chulymsky District is named after the Chulyms, a native ethnicity, who are closely related to the Khakas and Tuvans.

== Geography ==
Rivers Chulym and Karasuk, as well as lake Itkul, are located in the district.

== Notable residents ==
- Yegor Ligachyov (1920–2021), Soviet and Russian politician
