= Starogornostalevo =

Starogornostalevo Старогорносталево
- Settlement
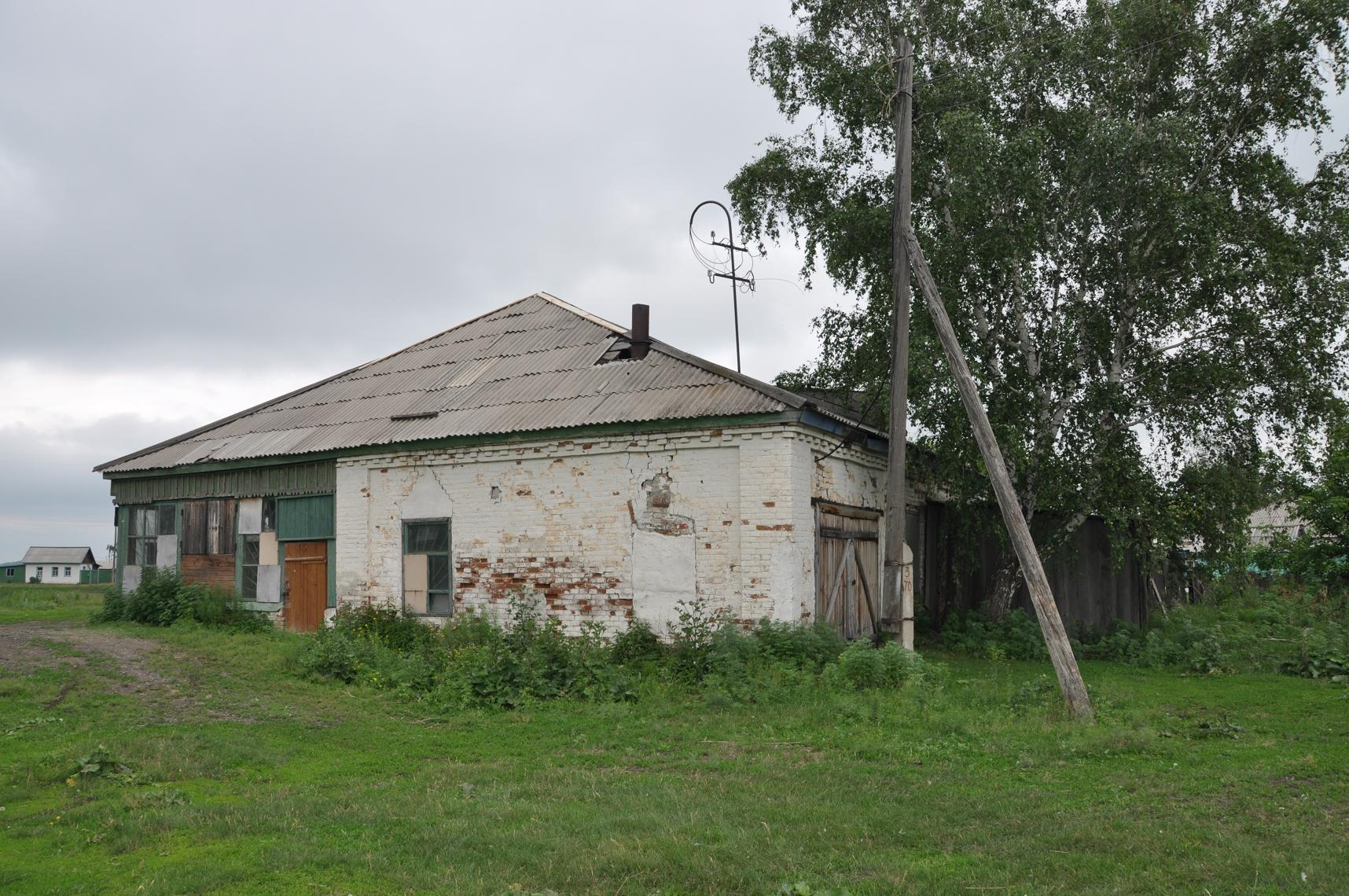

- Location within Novosibirsk Oblast Location within Russia
- Coordinates: 54°40′00″N 79°14′00″E
- Country: Russia
- Region: Novosibirsk Oblast
- District: Zdvinsky District

Starogornostalevo is a settlement (a selo) in Zdvinsky District of Novosibirsk Oblast, Russia. The administrative center of Gornostalevsky Selsoviet.

== History ==
The village was founded in 1773 (according to other sources in 1723).

In the 1930s, Peredovik and 12th year of October kolkhozes, as well as Kolkhoz named after Marx and Kolkhoz named after Lenin operated here.

From 1944 to 1955, children's home for orphans was located in Starogornostalevo.

In the 1950s, all kolkhozes of the settlement merged into one kolkhoz named after Lenin.

In April 1958, Kolkhoz named after Lenin became part of the Verkh-Kargat Sovkhoz, and farms No.5 and No.6 of Verkh-Kargat Sovkhoz were established in Starogornostalevo. In June 1959, the Selsoviet of Starogornostalevo and Verk-Kargat Selsoviet were merged into one Verkh-Kargat Selsoviet. This administrative merger created inconvenience for the residents of the settlement as they were forced to travel to the selsoviet, which was located in Verkh-Kargat, if they needed to contact the local authorities. In January 1972, Gornostalevo Sovkhoz was formed on the basis of farms No.4 and No.5 of Verkh-Kargat Sovkhoz. However, the territory of the selo still belonged to the Verkh-Kargat Selsoviet.

In 1991, after the demand of the residents, Gornostalevo Village Council of People's Deputies was re-established in the settlement.

According to the results of the elections of March 17, 1991, 15 deputies were elected to the Gornostalevo Selsoviet. On March 30, 1991, G. G. Pogotovko took over as chairman of the Gornostalevo Village Council. In December 1991, the executive committee of the Gornostalevo Selsoviet was liquidated, and the Administration of the Gornostalevo Selsoviet became its legal successor. G. G. Pogotovko was reappointed to the post of head of the administration. In 2002, this post was taken by S. P. Tolkushkin. In 2004, N. A. Belenko became the head of the municipal formation, who was succeeded by F. V. Wolf (2010).

== Demographics ==
According to the census of 1926, there were 633 households and 3375 inhabitants in the settlement, mostly Ukrainians; as of 1 January 1991, households – 295, residents — 906; as of 1 January 2012, households – 254, residents – 797; in 2013, 778 people lived in Starogornostalevo.

== Economics ==
The Novy Dom Company operates in the village, which produces various types of cheese, as well as the Iskander Company, a manufacturer of meat and dairy products.

== Social life ==
The settlement has a school, a library and a house of culture. The Women's Council also operates here.

== Medicine ==
There is a urgent care center in Starogornostalevo.
