= Sartlan =

Lake in Russia

- Сартлан
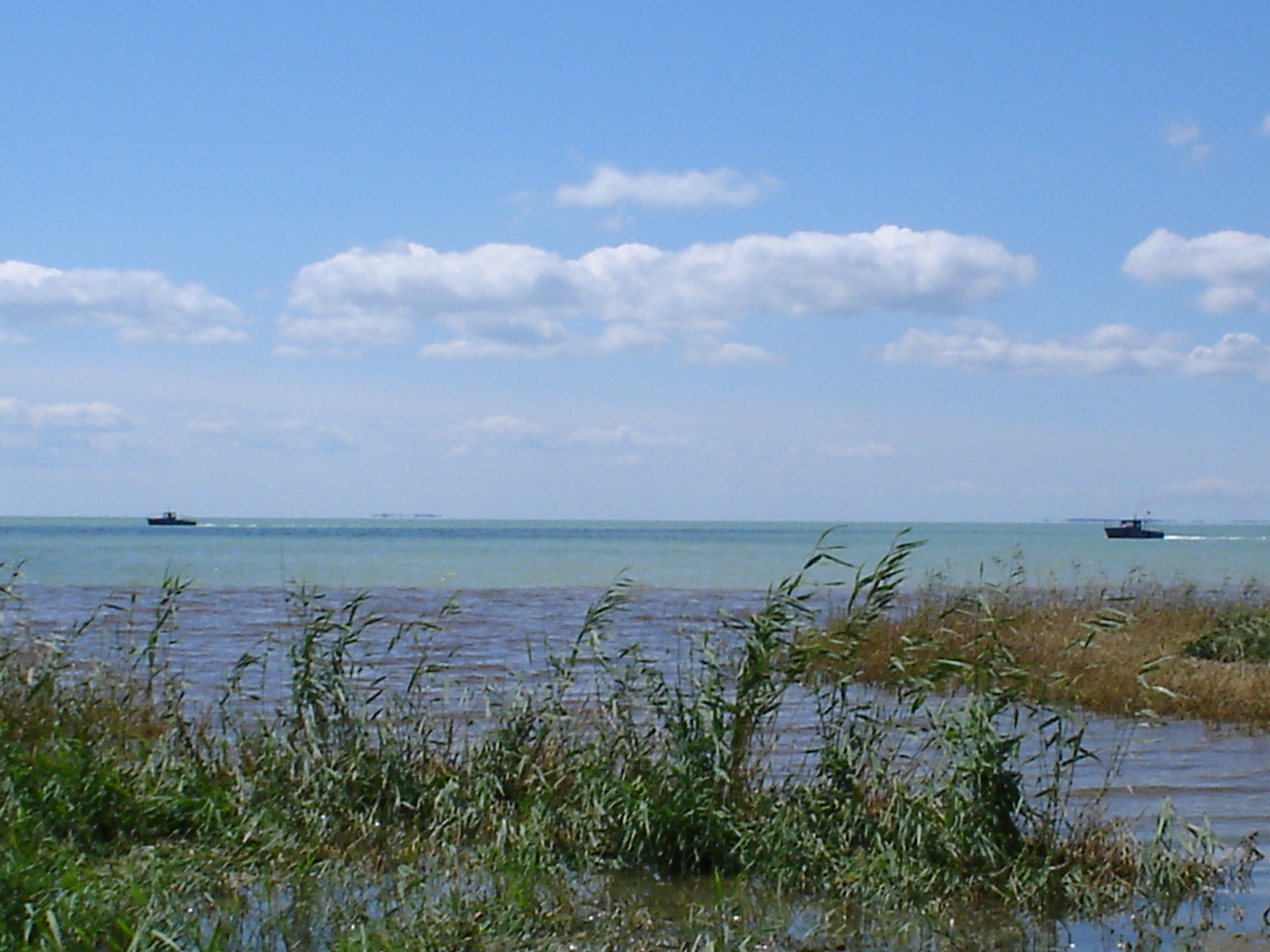

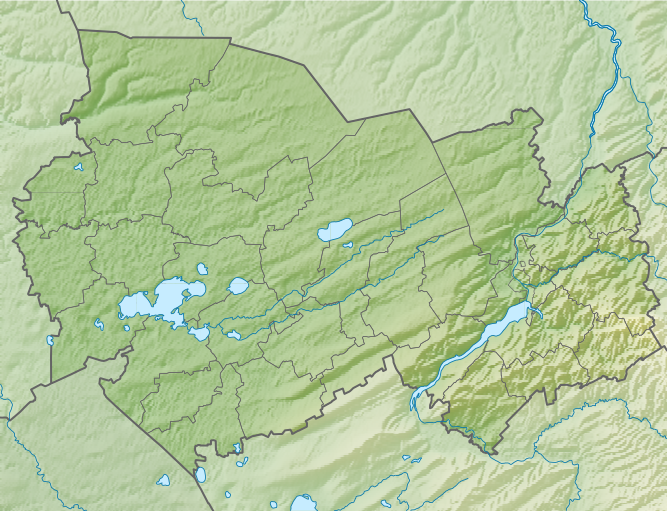
- Location within Russia Location within Novosibirsk Oblast
- Location: Novosibirsk Oblast, Russia
- Coordinates: 54°59′N 78°35′E
- Catchment area: 2,020 km^{2} (780 sq mi)
- Surface area: 238 km^{2} (92 sq mi)
- Max. depth: 6 m (20 ft)
- Surface elevation: 110 m (360 ft)

Sartlan (Russian: Сартлан) is an endorheic hyposaline lake in the Baraba steppe of Novosibirsk Oblast, Russia. Sartlan has a surface area of 238 km^{2} (92 sq mi). It is the third largest lake in Novosibirsk Oblast after Lake Chany and Lake Ubinskoye. It has an average depth of about 3 m and a maximum depth of 6 m.

Lake Malye Chany lies 36 kilometers (22 mi) to the southwest, Uryum 33 kilometers (21 mi) to the south, and Sargul 31 kilometers (19 mi) to the ESE.

In 1948 and 1984, cases of Haff disease were recorded near the lake. It is also known as Sartlan disease.

== Gallery ==
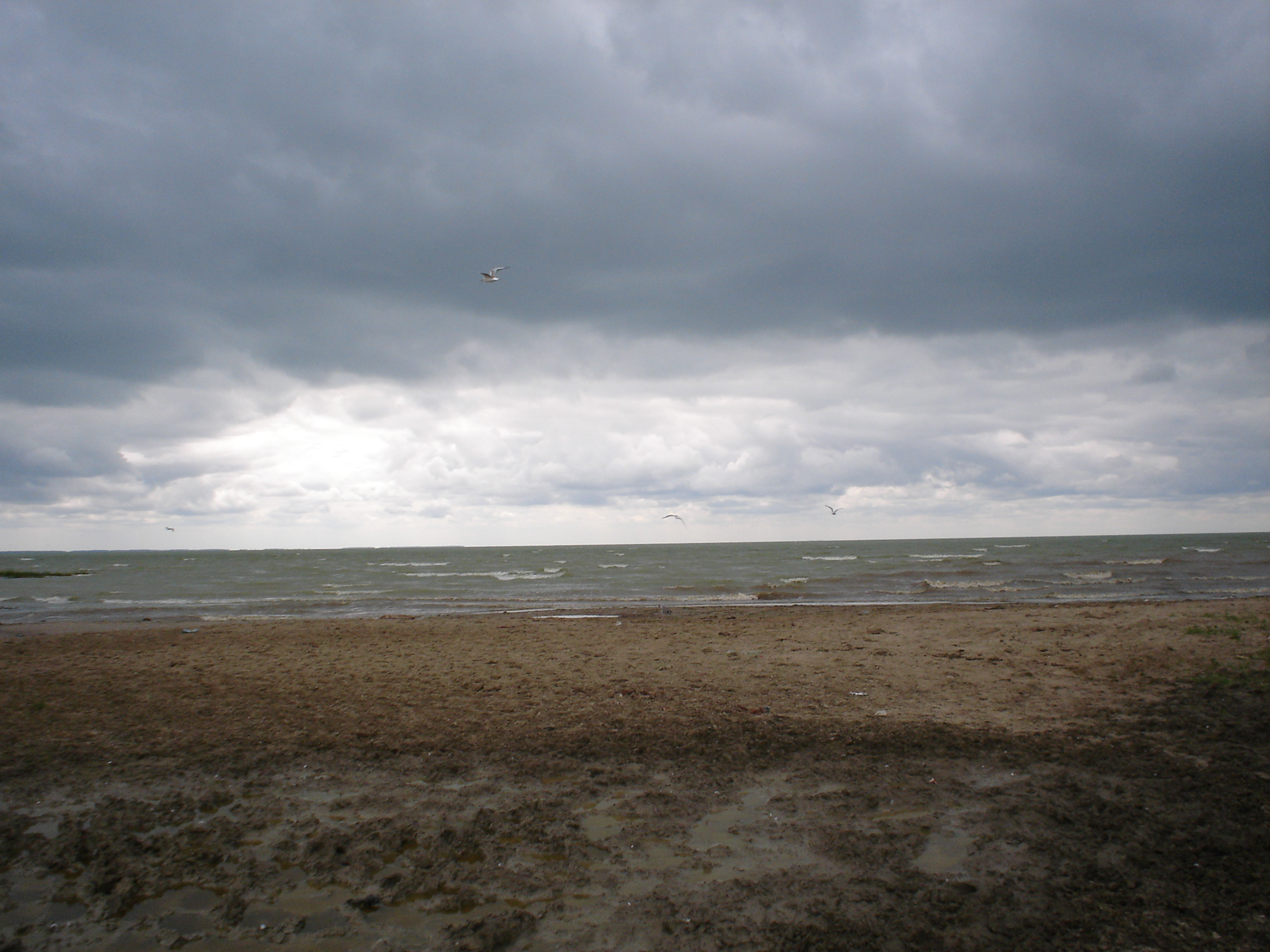
