= Ubinskoye (lake) =

Lake in Novosibirsk Oblast, Russia

- Убинское
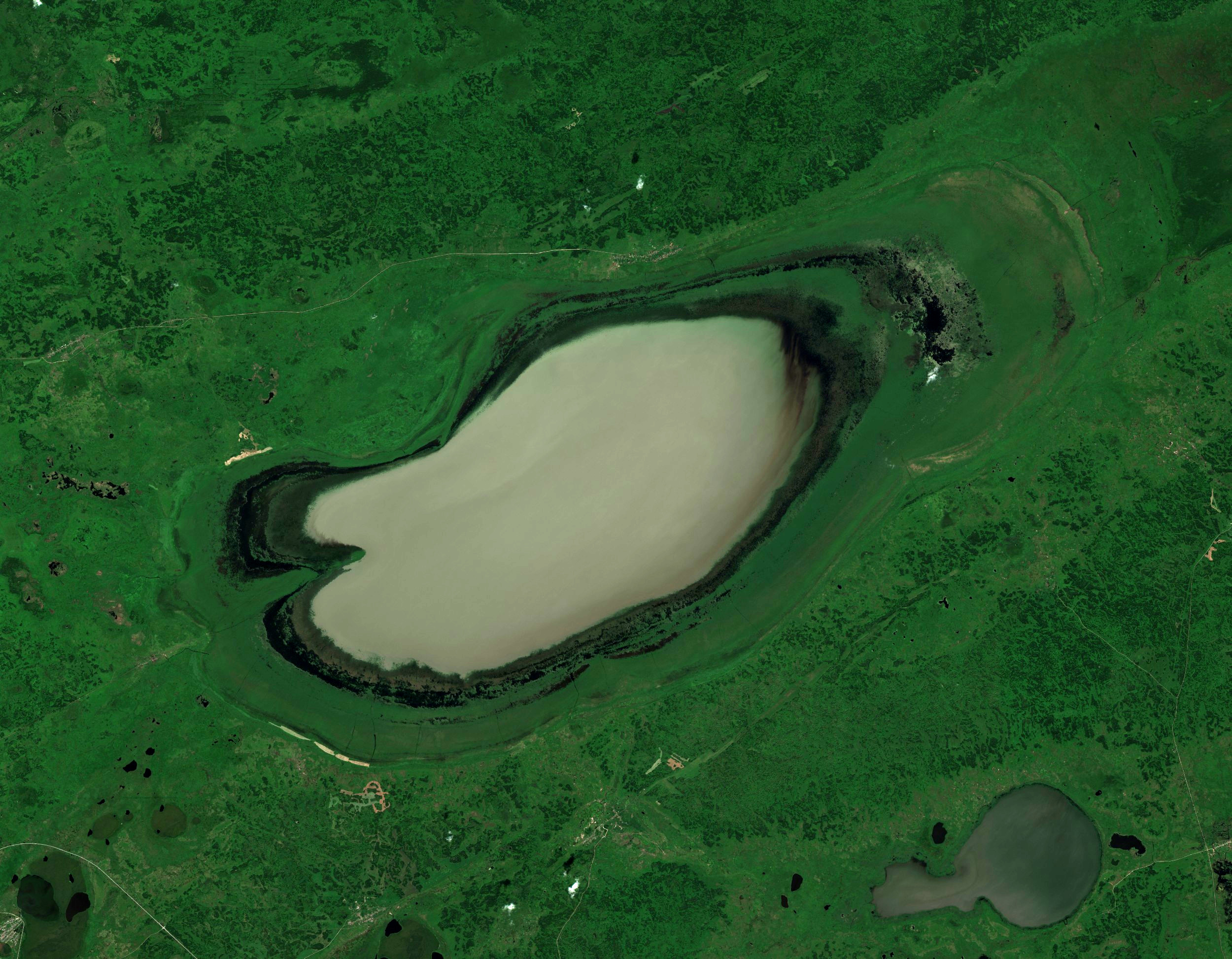

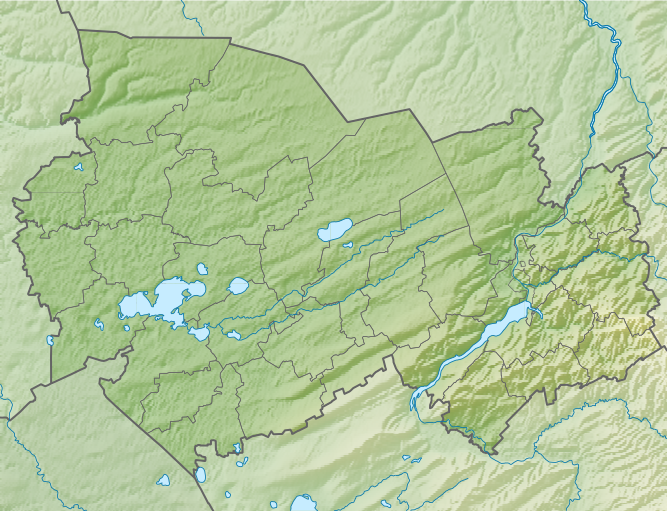
- Location in Novosibirsk Oblast, Russia
- Location: Novosibirsk Oblast, Russia
- Coordinates: 55°28′12″N 80°02′24″E
- Catchment area: 2,990 km^{2} (1,150 sq mi)
- Max. length: 27.4 kilometers (17.0 mi)
- Max. width: 12.6 kilometers (7.8 mi)
- Surface area: 436 square kilometers (168 sq mi)
- Average depth: 1 meter (3 ft 3 in)
- Max. depth: 0.6 meters (2 ft 0 in)
- Surface elevation: 134 m (440 ft)

Ubinskoye (Russian: Убинское озеро) is a freshwater lake located in the Baraba steppe in Novosibirsk Oblast, Russia, where it is divided between Ubinsky District in the west and Kargatsky District in the east. The name of the lake derives from Siberian Tatar ubu, meaning swamp or marsh.

Ubinskoye is surrounded by several villages, the largest of which is Chernyy Mys on the northern shore. According to legend, Kuchum, the last Khan of Sibir, sank his treasure in the lake while fleeing from the Russians.

== Geography ==
Ubinskoye is an oval-shaped lake with gently sloping banks. The lake bottom consists of clayey sand covered by a thick layer of gray fine-grained silt. There are several islands in the lake, the largest of which is called Medyakovsky. The western part of the Ubinskoye basin also contains a number of other small lakes. Lake Kargan lies 12 kilometers (7.5 mi) to the south, Itkul 67 kilometers (42 mi) to the southeast, Sartlan 84 kilometres (52 mi) to the southwest and Chany 130 kilometres (81 mi) to the WSW.

During spring melt lake Ubinskoye covers a maximum area of 440 square kilometres (170 sq mi) and is 2.0–2.8 metres (6 ft 7 in – 9 ft 2 in) deep; during periods of low water it is only 0.6–1.0 metre (2 ft 0 in – 3 ft 3 in) deep, and in October 2013 it was estimated from aerial imagery to cover 350 square kilometres (140 sq mi). The lake drains an area of 2,990 square kilometres (1,150 sq mi). Ubinskoye is mainly fed by melting snow and usually has no outlet, but in the spring of some years it overflows into the Ubinke River, a tributary of the Om River.

Ubinskoye freezes over from November to late May. The ice on the lake is 0.7–1.0 metre (2 ft 4 in – 3 ft 3 in) thick. In summer the water warms up to 20–24 °C (68–75 °F). The temperature is uniform throughout the water column due to good mixing. The water pH is between 7.6 and 9.0.

== Flora and fauna ==
Ubinskoye is a mesotrophic lake whose plankton is dominated by green and blue-green algae. The shores of the lake are overgrown with reeds and sedges. In the mid-20th century Lake Ubinskoye was well known for its abundance of fish: bream (introduced in 1929), roach, pike, ide, carp, and peled were exploited commercially. Fish stocks crashed in the 1990s, likely due to the lowering of the water level; currently only small crucian carp remain. Attempts to restock the lake have failed, but a recent increase in water levels gives hope for future efforts. The lake and its surrounding wetlands continue to host a great variety of bird life.

== See also ==
- Relict Lime Grove (Novosibirsk Oblast)
