= Itkul (Chulym basin) =

Lake in Russia

- Иткуль
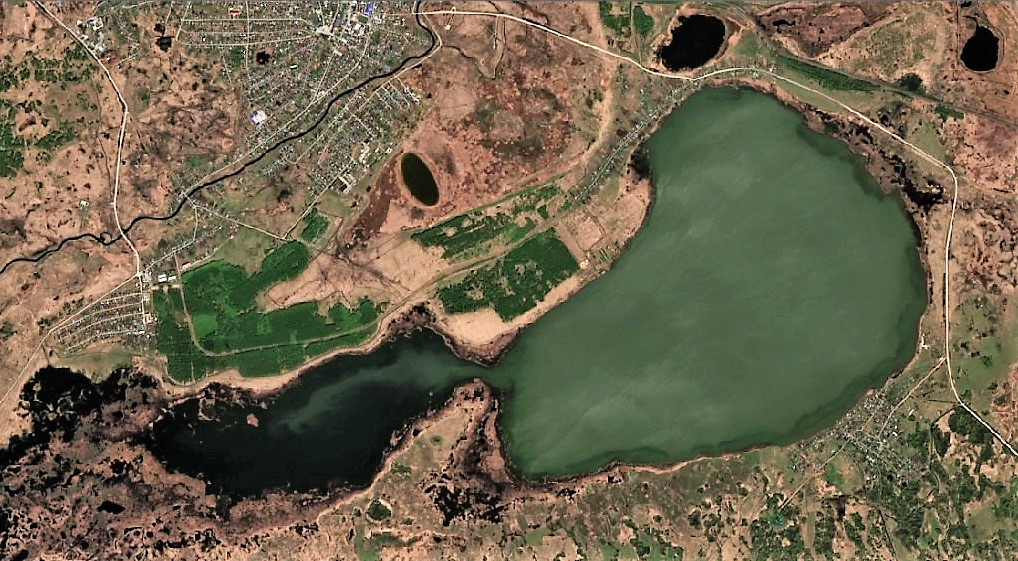
- Sentinel-2 picture of the lake

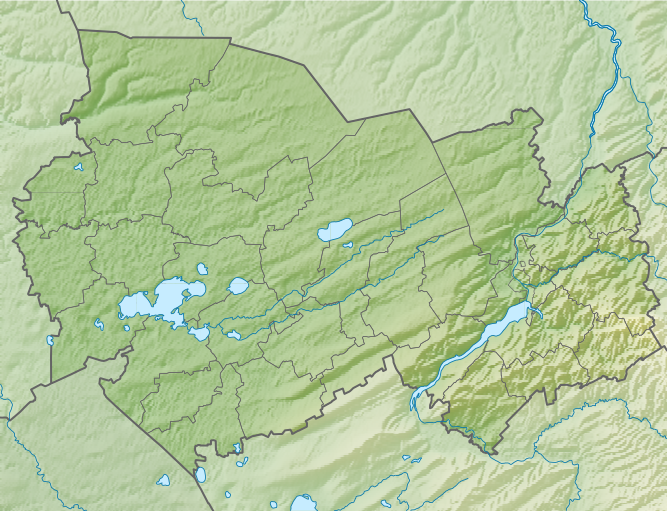
- Location within Novosibirsk Oblast Location within Russia
- Location: Baraba Lowland; West Siberian Plain
- Coordinates: 55°04′10″N 81°02′28″E
- Basin countries: Russia
- Max. length: 8.7 kilometers (5.4 mi)
- Max. width: 3.8 kilometers (2.4 mi)
- Surface area: 12.7 square kilometers (4.9 sq mi)
- Residence time: UTC+7
- Surface elevation: 141 meters (463 ft)
- Settlements: Chulym

Itkul (Russian: Иткуль) is a lake in Chulymsky District, Novosibirsk Oblast, Russian Federation.

The lake is located 2 kilometers (1.2 mi) to the southeast of Chulym, the district capital.

== Geography ==
Itkul lies in the Baraba Lowland, West Siberian Plain and belongs to the Chulym river basin. It is the largest lake of Chulymsky District. The lake is elongated from east to west and has two lobes, a western one and an eastern one. They are connected to each other by a 130 meters (430 ft) wide sound. The eastern wing is about five times larger than the western one.

River Chulym flows 2.5 kilometers (1.6 mi) to the north. Lake Sektinskoye lies 23 kilometers (14 mi) to the east, Kargan 52 kilometers (32 mi) to the northwest, Ubinskoye 67 kilometers (42 mi) in the same direction, and Inder 81 kilometers (50 mi) to the southwest.

== See also ==
- List of lakes of Russia
