= Bagan (river) =

River in Siberia, Russia

Bagan Баган
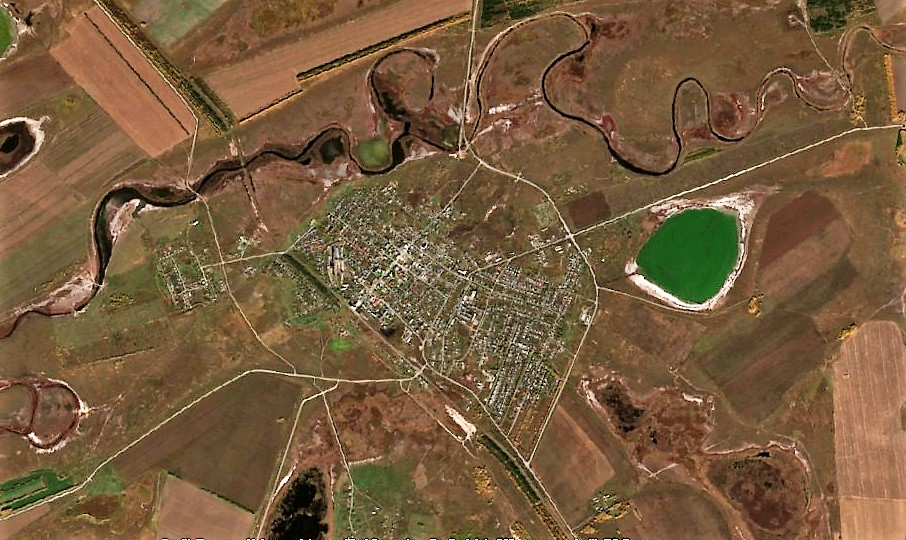
- The Bagan river flowing by Bagan town Sentinel-2 image

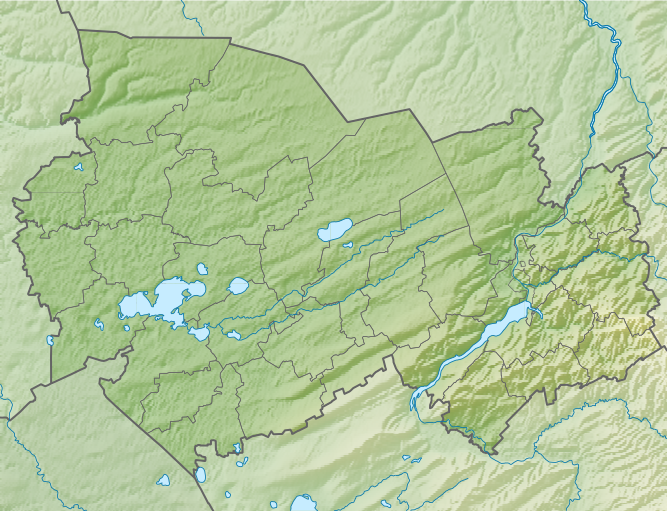
- Mouth location in Novosibirsk Oblast, Russia

Location
- Country: Russia

Physical characteristics
- Source: Ob Plateau
  - coordinates: 54°38′54″N 80°14′49″E
- Mouth: Lake Ivanovskoye
  - coordinates: 54°00′22″N 77°12′46″E
- Length: 364 km (226 mi)
- Basin size: 10,700 km^{2} (4,100 sq mi)

The Bagan (Russian: Баган) is a river in Novosibirsk Oblast, Russia. The river is 364 kilometres (226 mi) long and has a catchment area of 10,700 square kilometres (4,100 sq mi).

The basin of the river is located in the Kargatsky, Bagansky, Zdvinsky, Dovolensky, Krasnozyorsky and Karasuksky districts. Since 1994 here is a 26,880 ha (66,400 acres) Ramsar site in the lower course of the river.

== Course ==
The Bagan river system is an endorheic basin between the Ob and the Irtysh rivers. The sources are in a swamp at the western edge of the Ob Plateau. The river flows in a roughly WSW direction all along its course. It is fed mainly by snow. As it progresses along the Baraba Plain it flows across many lakes of different sizes, such as Inder lake. Finally it ends up in Lake Ivanovskoye.

In the river basin there are numerous swamps and lakes, both freshwater and brackish, such as Mochan. The Bagan tends to dry up seasonally in its lower reaches. There are a number of villages near the banks of the Bagan, such as Ozerki 6th, Inder, Dovolnoye, Volchanka, Druzhny, Novogornostalevo, Barlakul, Kukarka, Pokrovka, Paletskoye, Bagan and Ivanovka.

=== Tributaries ===
The main tributary of the Bagan is the 180 km (110 mi) long Baganyonok (Баганёнок) from the left.

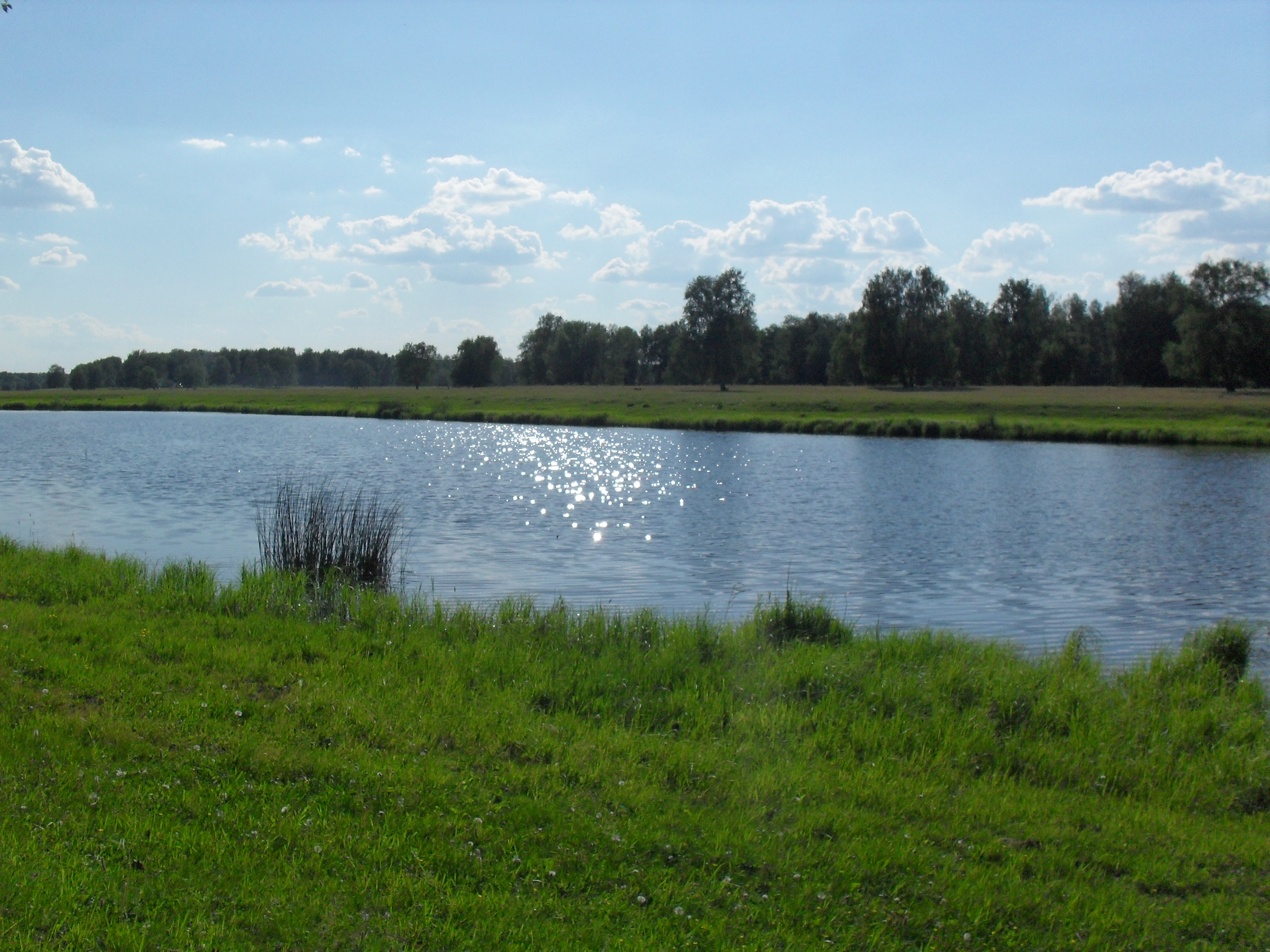
View of the Baganyonok.

== See also ==
- List of rivers of Russia
