= Relict Lime Grove (Novosibirsk Oblast) =

Ancient Russian grove of trees

The Relict Lime Grove is a linden grove in Ubinsky District of Novosibirsk Oblast, Russia. The grove has existed since preglacial times.

== History ==
The Relict Lime Grove was discovered in 1928 by A. M. Zharkova of the Russian Geographical Society.

== Description ==
The grove is several million years old. It is located in the Senchinskoye Swamp northeast of Lake Ubinskoye.
