= Kargat =

Town in Novosibirsk Oblast, Russia

Kargat Каргат
- Town
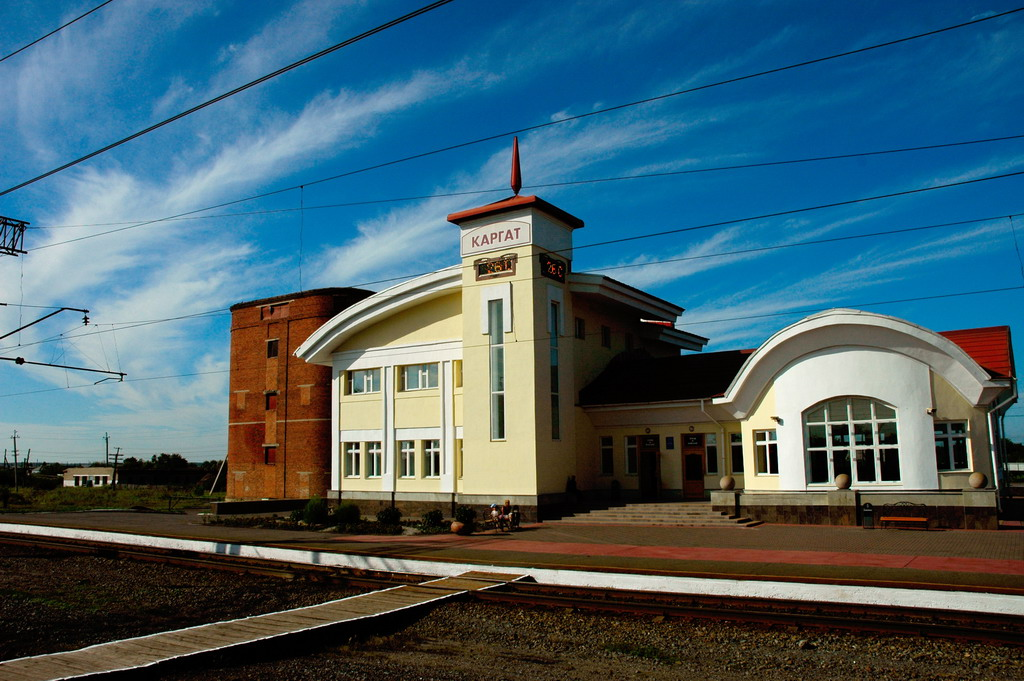
- Kargat railway station

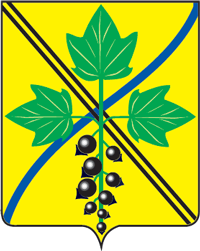
- Coat of arms
- Interactive map of Kargat
- Location of Kargat Kargat (Novosibirsk Oblast)
- Coordinates: 55°11′44″N 80°16′52″E
- Country: Russia
- Federal subject: Novosibirsk Oblast
- Administrative district: Kargatsky District
- TownSelsoviet: Kargat
- Elevation: 130 m (430 ft)

Population (2010 Census)
  - Total: 10,042
  - Estimate (2021): 8,316 (−17.2%)

Administrative status
  - Capital of: Kargatsky District, Town of Kargat

Municipal status
  - Municipal district: Kargatsky Municipal District
  - Urban settlement: Kargat Urban Settlement
  - Capital of: Kargatsky Municipal District, Kargat Urban Settlement
- Time zone: UTC+7 (MSK+4)
- Postal codes: 632400, 632402
- OKTMO ID: 50619101001

Kargat (Russian: Карга́т; Kazakh: Қарақат, Qaraqat) is a town and the administrative center of Kargatsky District in Novosibirsk Oblast, Russia, located on the river Kargat. Population: 10,042 (2010 census); 11,184 (2002 census); 12,561 (1989 Soviet census); 12,600 (1979); 12,700 (1959).

== Administrative and municipal status ==
Within the framework of administrative divisions, Kargat serves as the administrative center of Kargatsky District. As an administrative division, it is, together with two rural localities, incorporated within Kargatsky District as the Town of Kargat. As a municipal division, the Town of Kargat is incorporated within Kargatsky Municipal District as Kargat Urban Settlement.
