= Dovolnoye =

Rural locality in Novosibirsk Oblast, Russia

Dovolnoye Довольное
- Village
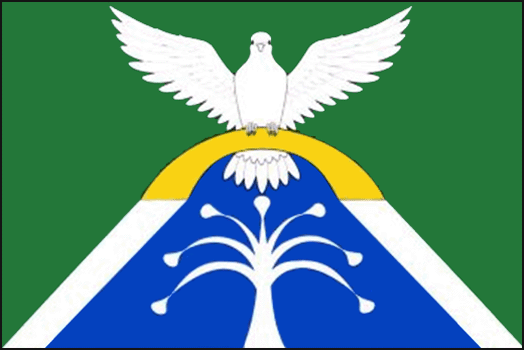
- Flag

- Location within Novosibirsk Oblast Location within Russia
- Coordinates: 54°29′46″N 79°39′39″E
- Country: Russia
- Region: Novosibirsk Oblast
- District: Dovolensky District
- Village Council: Dovolensky Village Council
- Elevation: 132 m (433 ft)
- Time zone: UTC+7:00
- Postcode: 632451

Dovolnoye (Russian: Довольное) is a rural locality (a selo) and the administrative center of Dovolensky District, Novosibirsk Oblast, Russia. Population: 6,774 (2010 census); 7,314 (2002 census); 7,865 (1989 Soviet census).

== Geography ==
Dovolnoye is located near the Bagan river, to the west of Inder lake.
