= Zdvinsk =

Zdvinsk Здвинск
- Village
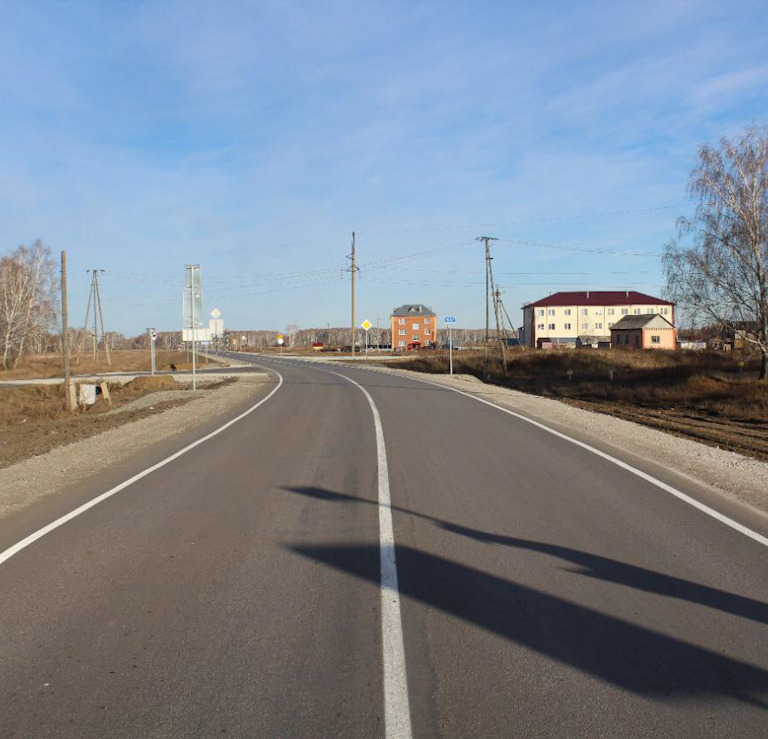

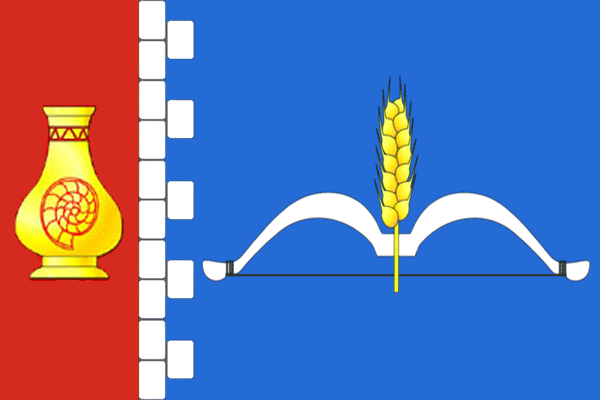
- Flag

- Location within Novosibirsk Oblast Location within Russia
- Coordinates: 54°42′N 78°40′E
- Country: Russia
- Region: Novosibirsk Oblast
- District: Zdvinsky District
- Village Council: Zdvinsky Village Council
- Established: 1773
- Time zone: UTC+7:00
- Postcode: 632950

Zdvinsk (Russian: Здвинск) is a rural locality (a selo) and the administrative center of Zdvinsky District of Novosibirsk Oblast, Russia. It is the head of the Zdvinsky Village Council.

Population: 5,602 (2010 census); 5,611 (2002 census); 5,841 (1989 Soviet census). (dialing code +7 38363)

== Geography ==
Located on the banks of the Kargat River, the landscape of Zdvisk is characteristic of the southern Baraba Plain, featuring forests interspersed with steppe areas.

== History ==
It was founded in 1773 as a farmed plot of land called Taskayevo (Таскаево). It grew in size in the following years and in 1896 was renamed Nizhny Kargat (Нижний Каргат). On June 7, 1933, it was given its present name, Zdvinsk, after a local revolutionary M. Zdvinsky who died in 1918. It was granted urban-type settlement status in 1978, but was demoted back to a rural locality in 1992.

== Transportation ==
Zdvinsk does not have direct railway access or an airport. The Baikal Highway passes by the town and connects it with Barabinsk, a major railway station.

== Notable residents ==
- Aleksandr Stolyarenko (born 1991), footballer
