= Inder (Bagan basin) =

Lake in Russia

- Индерь
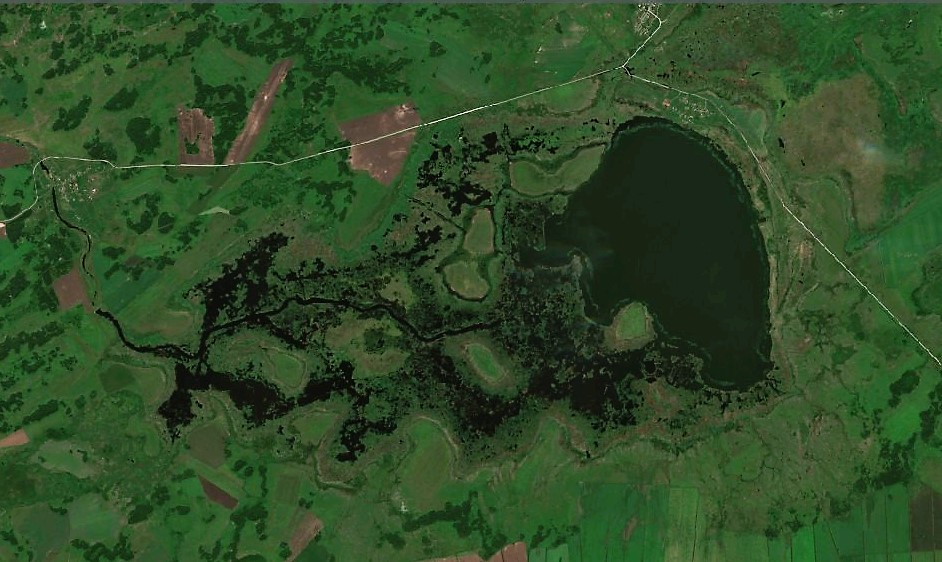
- Inder lake Sentinel-2 image

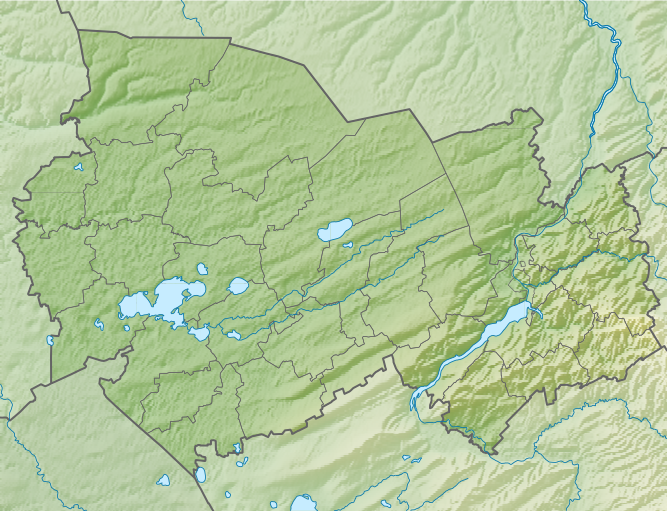
- Location within Novosibirsk Oblast Location within Russia
- Location: Baraba Steppe; West Siberian Plain
- Coordinates: 54°30′04″N 79°59′04″E
- Type: fluvial lake
- Primary inflows: Bagan
- Primary outflows: Bagan
- Catchment area: 1,110 square kilometers (430 sq mi)
- Basin countries: Russia
- Max. length: 6.5 kilometers (4.0 mi)
- Max. width: 5.1 kilometers (3.2 mi)
- Surface area: 18.5 square kilometers (7.1 sq mi)
- Max. depth: 3 meters (9.8 ft)
- Residence time: UTC+7
- Surface elevation: 137 meters (449 ft)
- Islands: Yes
- Settlements: Dovolnoye

Inder (Russian: Индерь) is a lake in Dovolensky District, Novosibirsk Oblast, Russian Federation.

The lake lies in the southern sector of the Oblast. Inder village is located a little north of the northern shore and Dovolnoye town, the district capital, 9 kilometers (5.6 mi) to the west of the western shore.

== Geography ==
Inder lies in the Baraba Steppe, part of the West Siberian Plain. The Bagan river flows through the lake entering it from the northeast and flowing out of it from the western end. The western half of the lake is shallow and swampy, encumbered by aquatic vegetation. There are also a few large islands. Counting the marshy areas in the west and in the south the lake is 13.1 kilometers (8.1 mi) long and 6.2 kilometers (3.9 mi) wide. Lake Uryum lies 78 kilometers (48 mi) to the west, and Itkul 81 kilometers (50 mi) to the northeast.

== Flora and fauna ==
Reeds and sphagnum grow by the lakeshore. Cultivated fields, some of them abandoned, surround the lake. There are as well some areas of steppe vegetation with sedges and grasses. The lake is an important protected area for birds. It is part of the Indersky Ryam, a 1,714 hectares (4,240 acres) wetland site, where several waterfowl, including the bean goose, have been recorded nesting. 12 species of birds in the lake area are rare and endangered.

The fish species in lake Inder include sig, crucian carp and Eurasian carp. Peled were released in the lake years ago.

== See also ==
- List of lakes of Russia
