= Chulym, Chulymsky District, Novosibirsk Oblast =

Town in Novosibirsk Oblast, Russia

Chulym Чулым
- Town
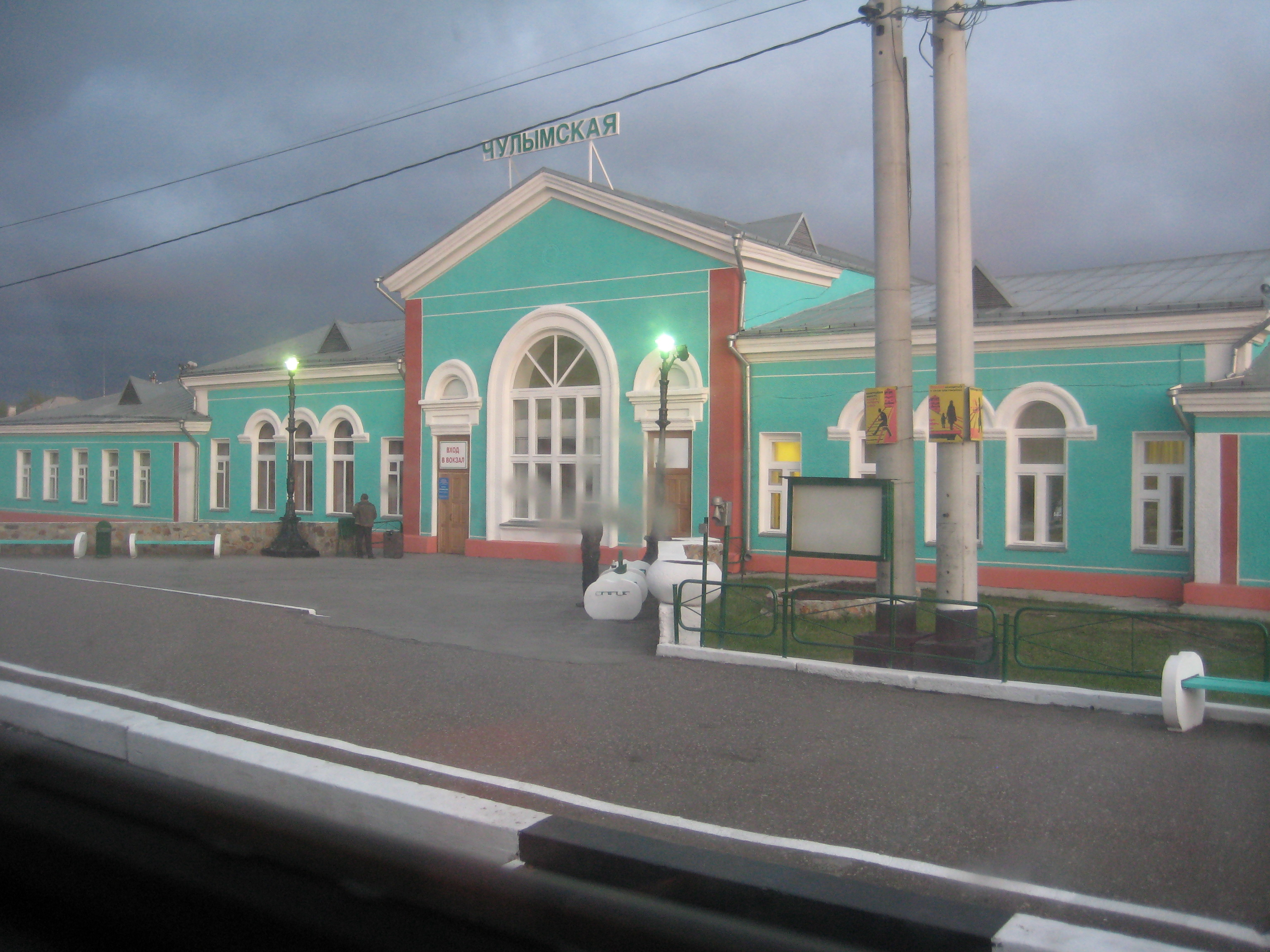
- Railway station in Chulym
- Interactive map of Chulym
- Location of Chulym Chulym (Novosibirsk Oblast)
- Coordinates: 55°07′N 80°58′E
- Country: Russia
- Federal subject: Novosibirsk Oblast
- Administrative district: Chulymsky District
- TownSelsoviet: Chulym
- Founded: 1762
- Town status since: 1947
- Elevation: 130 m (430 ft)

Population (2010 Census)
  - Total: 11,568
  - Estimate (2021): 11,034 (−4.6%)

Administrative status
  - Capital of: Chulymsky District, Town of Chulym

Municipal status
  - Municipal district: Chulymsky Municipal District
  - Urban settlement: Chulym Urban Settlement
  - Capital of: Chulymsky Municipal District, Chulym Urban Settlement
- Time zone: UTC+7 (MSK+4)
- Postal code: 632550–632553
- OKTMO ID: 50659101001
- Website: www.admchulym.ru

Chulym (Russian: Чулы́м) is a town and the administrative center of Chulymsky District in Novosibirsk Oblast, Russia, 131 kilometers (81 mi) from Novosibirsk, the administrative center of the oblast. Population: 11,568 (2010 census); 12,275 (2002 census); 13,703 (1989 Soviet census). It was previously known as Chulymskoye.

== History ==
The settlement of Chulymskoye (Чулымское) was founded in 1762 during the construction of the Siberian Route. In 1898, the Trans-Siberian Railway was built through the settlement. In 1947, Chulym was granted town status.

== Administrative and municipal status ==
Within the framework of administrative divisions, Chulym serves as the administrative center of Chulymsky District. As an administrative division, it is incorporated within Chulymsky District as the Town of Chulym. As a municipal division, the Town of Chulym is incorporated within Chulymsky Municipal District as Chulym Urban Settlement.

== Geography ==
The town is located by the banks of the Chulym river. Lake Itkul lies 2 kilometers (1.2 mi) to the southeast.
