= Dovolensky District =

Dovolensky District Доволенский район (Russian)
- District
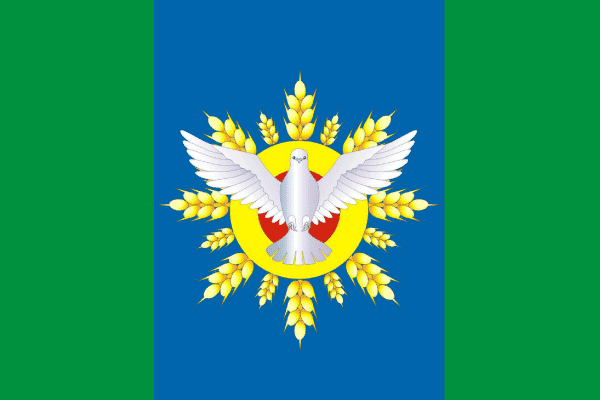
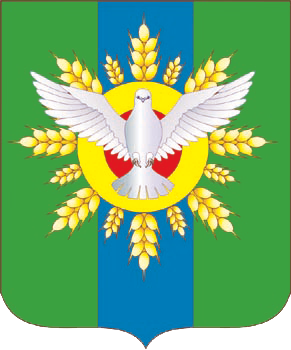
- Flag Coat of arms
- Location of Dovolensky District in Novosibirsk Oblast
- Coordinates: 54°29′32″N 79°40′22″E
- Country: Russia
- Federal subject: Novosibirsk Oblast
- Established: 9 December 1925
- Administrative center: Dovolnoye

Area
  - Total: 4,400 km^{2} (1,700 sq mi)

Population (2010 Census)
  - Total: 17,405
  - Density: 4.0/km^{2} (10/sq mi)
  - Urban: 0%
  - Rural: 100%

Administrative structure
  - Inhabited localities: 27 rural localities

Municipal structure
  - Municipally incorporated as: Dovolensky Municipal District
  - Municipal divisions: 0 urban settlements, 13 rural settlements
- Time zone: UTC+7 (MSK+4)
- OKTMO ID: 50610000
- Website: http://dovolnoe.nso.ru/

Dovolensky District (Russian: Дово́ленский райо́н) is an administrative and municipal district (raion), one of the thirty in Novosibirsk Oblast, Russia. It is located in the south of the oblast. The area of the district is 4,400 square kilometers (1,700 sq mi). Its administrative center is the rural locality (a selo) of Dovolnoye. Population: 17,405 (2010 Census); 20,664 (2002 census); 22,506 (1989 Soviet census).

The population of Dovolnoye accounts for 38.9% of the district's total population.

== Geography ==
The Bagan river and Inder lake are located in the district.
