= Kargat (river) =

Kargat Каргат
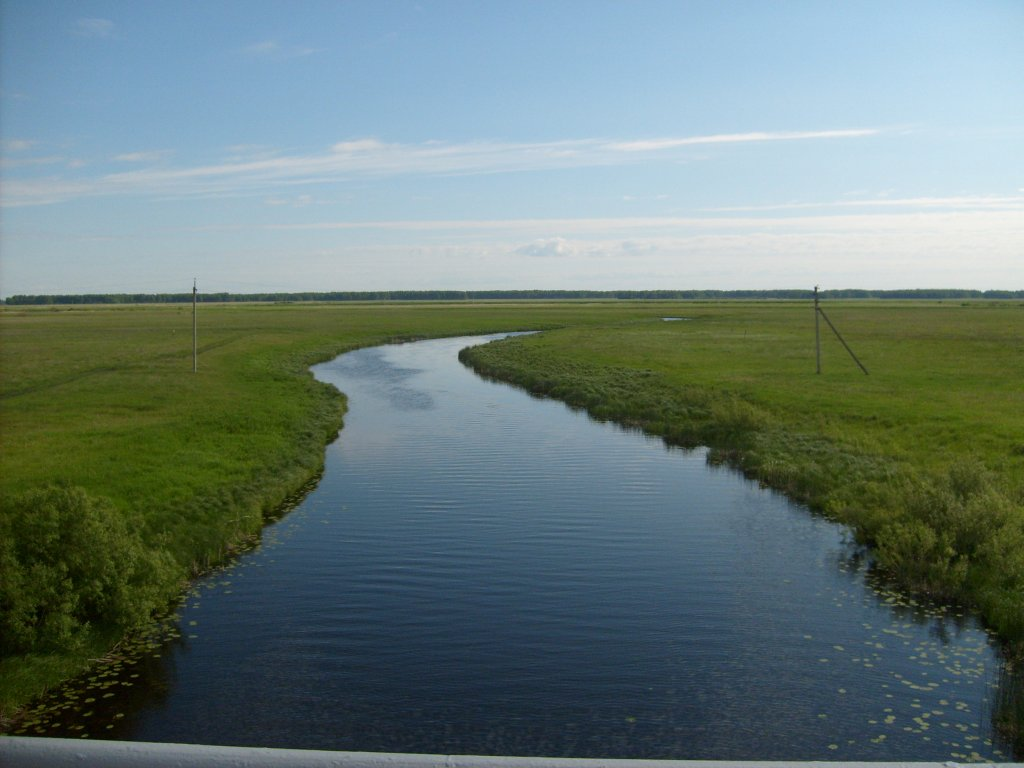

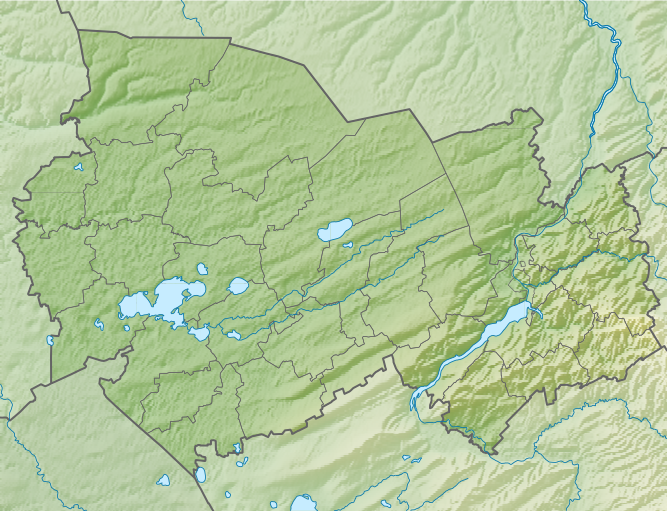
- Mouth location in Novosibirsk Oblast, Russia
- Native name: Каргат (Russian)

Location
- Country: Russia
- Federal subject: Novosibirsk Oblast

Physical characteristics
- Mouth: Chulym
  - coordinates: 54°38′37″N 78°16′0″E
- Length: 387 km (240 mi)

Basin features
- Progression: Chulym → Malye Chany

The Kargat (Russian: Каргат) is a river in Novosibirsk Oblast, Russia. It is a right tributary of the Chulym. The Kargat is 387 kilometres (240 mi) in length, with a drainage basin of 7,210 square kilometres (2,780 sq mi).

== Course ==
The river begins in the southern sections of the Vasyugan Swamp, at 143 metres (469 ft) above sea level and flows in a southwesterly direction over the Baraba Steppe roughly parallel to the Chulym River. Finally it joins the left bank of the Chulym at an elevation of 110 metres (360 ft), shortly before its mouth in lake Malye Chany. A significant part of its waters either evaporates or is infiltrated in the ground, and the average discharge at the village of Nizhny Kargat, 36 kilometres (22 mi) from its mouth, is just 8.54 cubic metres per second (302 cu ft/s). In its lower reaches the river is some 30 metres (98 ft) wide and 2 metres (6.6 ft) deep, with a flow rate of 0.1 metres per second (0.33 ft/s). The Kargat has no major tributaries. Lake Kargan is located within its basin.

In its middle course is the town of Kargat, named after the river. Here the river is crossed by the Trans-Siberian Railway and the M51 highway.

The Kargat is frozen over from November to April or May.

== See also ==
- List of rivers of Russia
