= Zdvinsky District =

Zdvinsky District Здвинский район (Russian)
- District
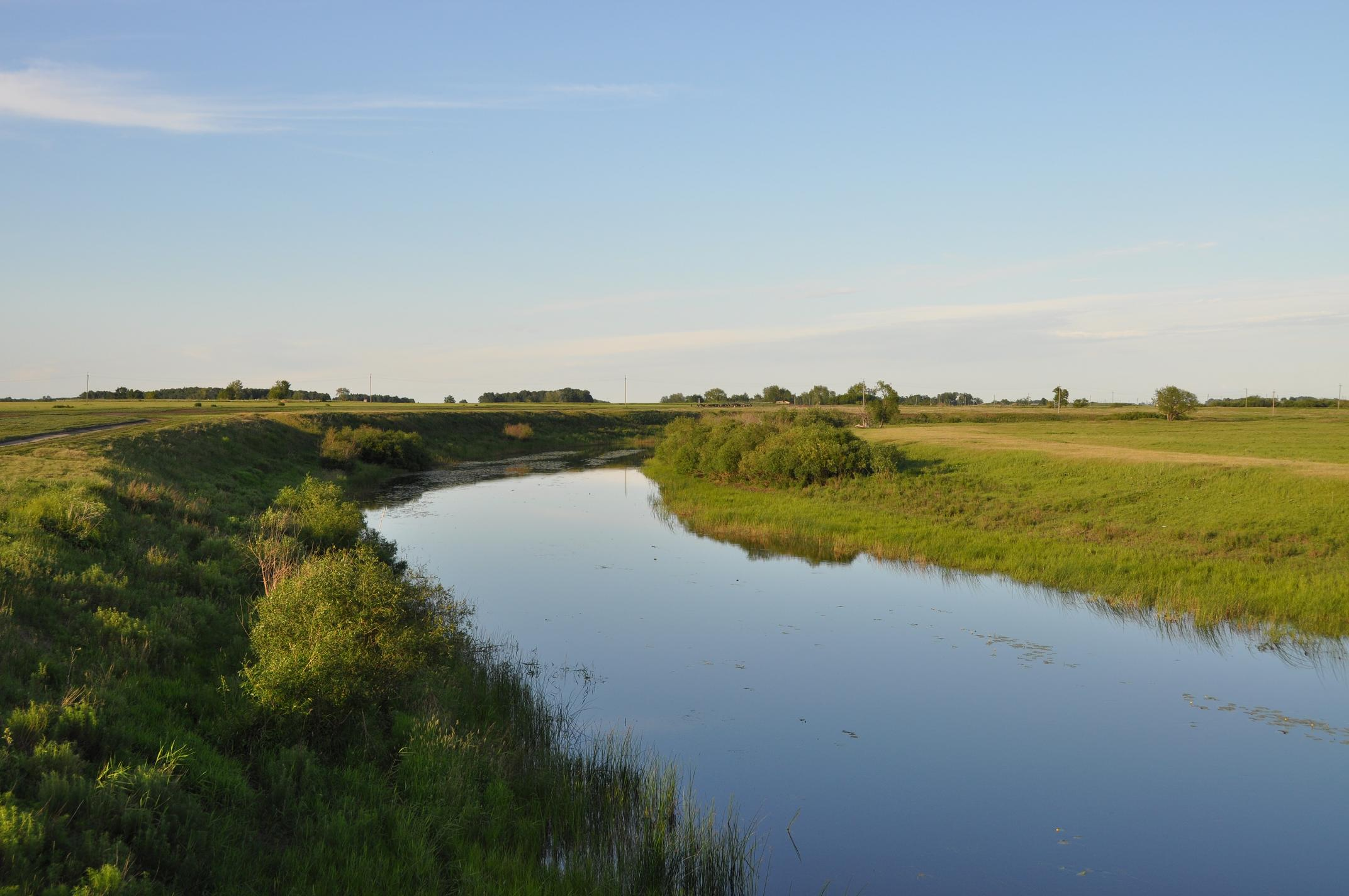
- River Chulym near Starogornostalevo in Zdvinsky District

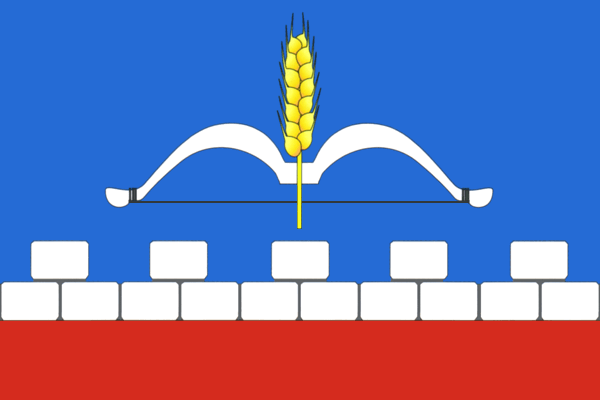
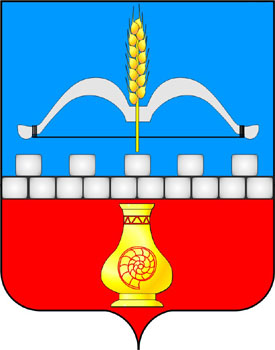
- Flag Coat of arms
- Location of Zdvinsky District in Novosibirsk Oblast
- Coordinates: 54°42′N 78°40′E
- Country: Russia
- Federal subject: Novosibirsk Oblast
- Established: 1925
- Administrative center: Zdvinsk

Area
  - Total: 4,943 km^{2} (1,909 sq mi)

Population (2010 Census)
  - Total: 16,636
  - Density: 3.366/km^{2} (8.717/sq mi)
  - Urban: 0%
  - Rural: 100%

Administrative structure
  - Inhabited localities: 36 rural localities

Municipal structure
  - Municipally incorporated as: Zdvinsky Municipal District
  - Municipal divisions: 0 urban settlements, 14 rural settlements
- Time zone: UTC+7 (MSK+4)
- OKTMO ID: 50613000
- Website: http://www.zdvinsk.nso.ru/

Zdvinsky District (Russian: Здви́нский райо́н) is an administrative and municipal district (raion), one of the thirty in Novosibirsk Oblast, Russia. It is located in the southwestern central part of the oblast. The area of the district is 4,943 square kilometers (1,909 sq mi). Its administrative center is the rural locality (a selo) of Zdvinsk. Population: 16,636 (2010 Census); 18,770 (2002 census); 21,035 (1989 Soviet census). The population of Zdvinsk accounts for 33.7% of the district's total population.

== Geography ==
Lakes Sargul, Uryum and part of Malye Chany, as well as the Chulym river, are located in the district.
