= Chulym (Malye Chany basin) =

River in Russia

Chulym Чулым
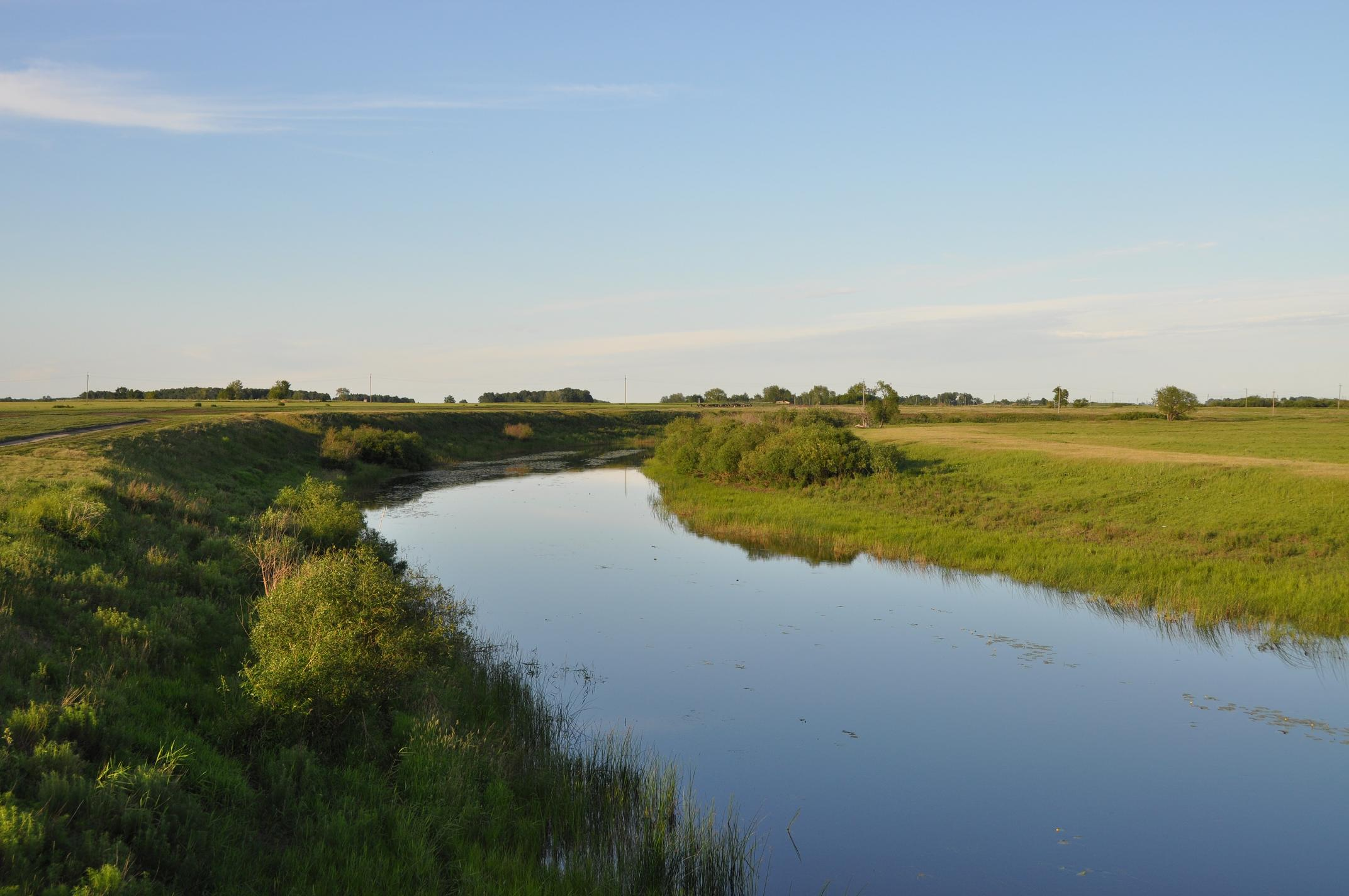

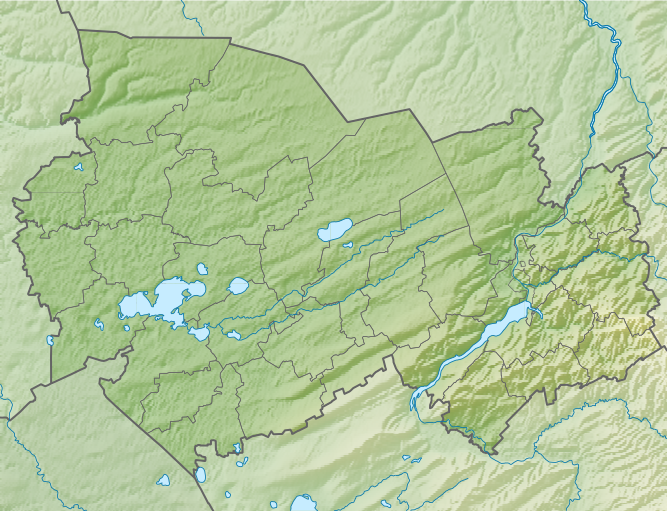
- Mouth location in Novosibirsk Oblast, Russia

Location
- Country: Russia

Physical characteristics
- Mouth: Malye Chany
  - coordinates: 54.6061°N 78.0975°E
- Length: 392 km (244 mi)
- Basin size: 17,900 km^{2} (6,900 sq mi)

Basin features
- Tributaries
  - right: Kargat

The Chulym (Russian: Чулым) is a river in the endorheic drainage basin of Lake Chany in the southeastern part of the West Siberian Plain in Russia. The river is 392 kilometres (244 mi) long, with a drainage basin of 17,900 square kilometres (6,900 mi^{2}).

== Course ==
The Chulym is formed by several tributaries in the Toyskoye Zaymishche (Russian: Тойское Займище) and Troshinskoye Zaymishche (Russian: Трошинское Займище) swamps north of Baraba Steppe, some 100 kilometres (62 mi) northwest of Novosibirsk, at an elevation of 150 metres (490 ft). The river flows over the Baraba Steppe in a southwesterly direction, and flows through the lakes of Sargul (Russian: Саргуль), 34.6 square kilometres (13.4 mi^{2}), and Uryum (Russian: Урюм), 84.1 square kilometres (32.5 mi^{2}), before it finally terminates, at 106 metres (348 ft) elevation, in Lake Malye Chany (Russian: Малые Чаны – Little Chany), which is connected to Lake Chany through a short strait.

In its lower reaches the river is some 30 metres (98 ft) wide and 5 metres (16 ft) deep. Its main tributaries are the Suma River (left), and the Kargat River (right). Lake Itkul is one of the largest lakes of the Chulym floodplain.

In its upper course is the town of Chulym, named after the river. Here the river is crossed by the Trans-Siberian Railway and the M51 highway.

The Chulym is frozen over from November to April or May.

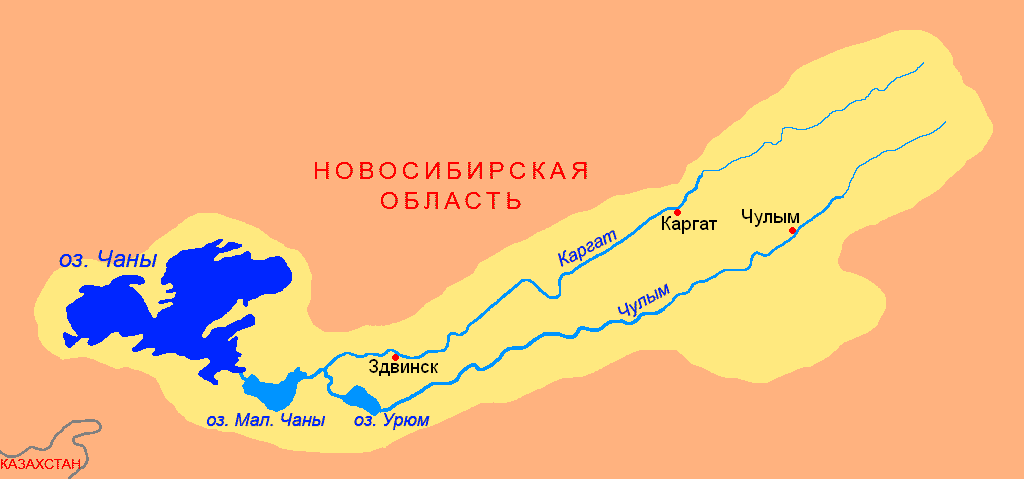
Chany basin with the Chulym in the lower right

== See also ==
- List of rivers of Russia
