= Zolotodolinskaya Street =

Street in Akademgorodok of Novosibirsk, Russia

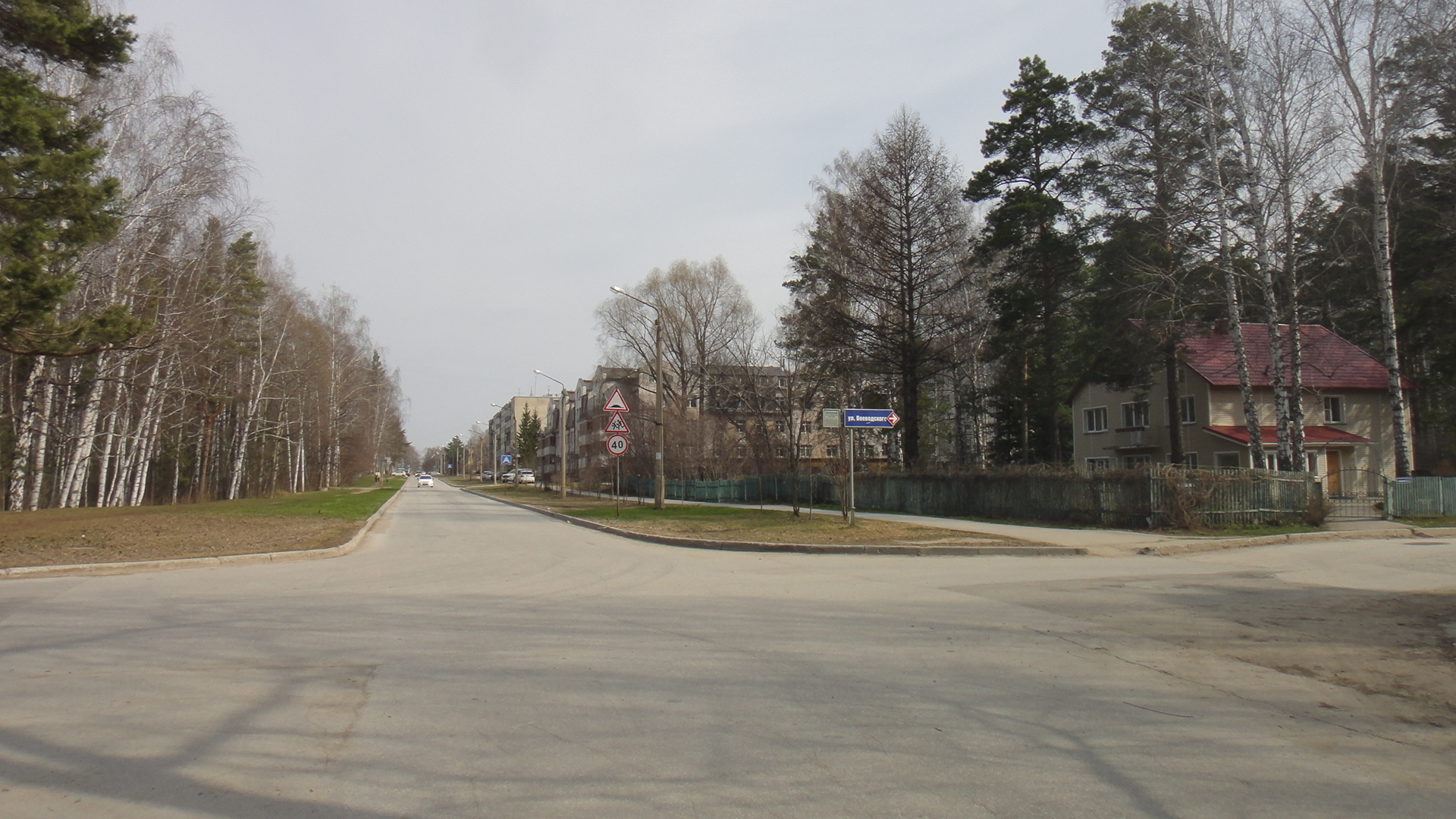
- Native name: Золотодолинская улица (Russian)
- Location: Novosibirsk; Russia

Zolotodolinskaya Street (Russian: Золотодолинская улица) is a street in Akademgorodok of Novosibirsk, Russia. It starts from Morskoy Prospekt, runs south-west, crosses Uchyonykh Street, then forms a crossroad with Voyevodsky and Maltsev streets and ends near Kirovo Settlement.

== Organizations ==
- Exhibition Center of the Siberian Branch of the RAS
- Viktoria Fencing Club is a sports club founded in 1968
- Museum of history and culture of the peoples of Siberia and the Far East
- Museum of the SB RAS

== Gallery ==
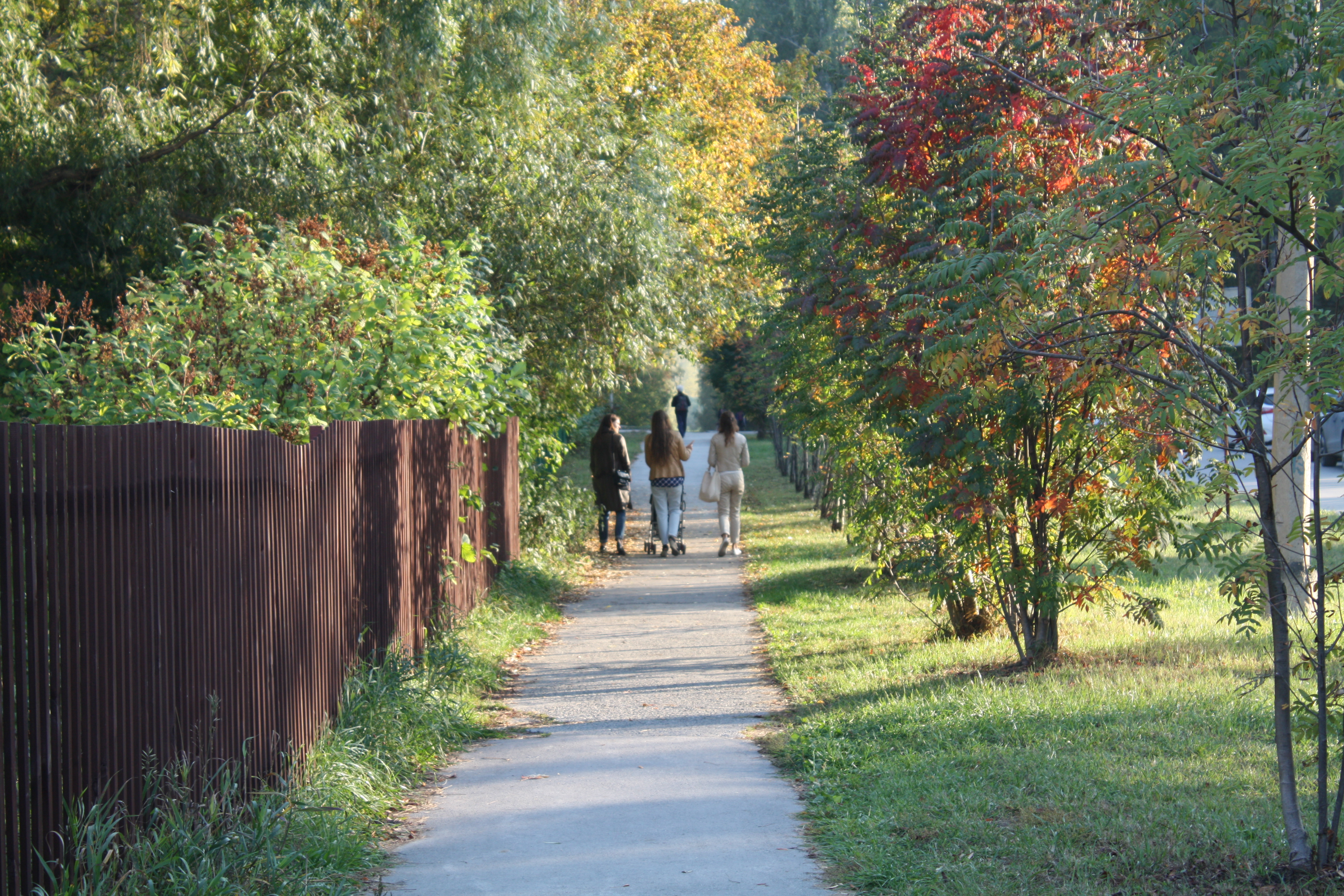

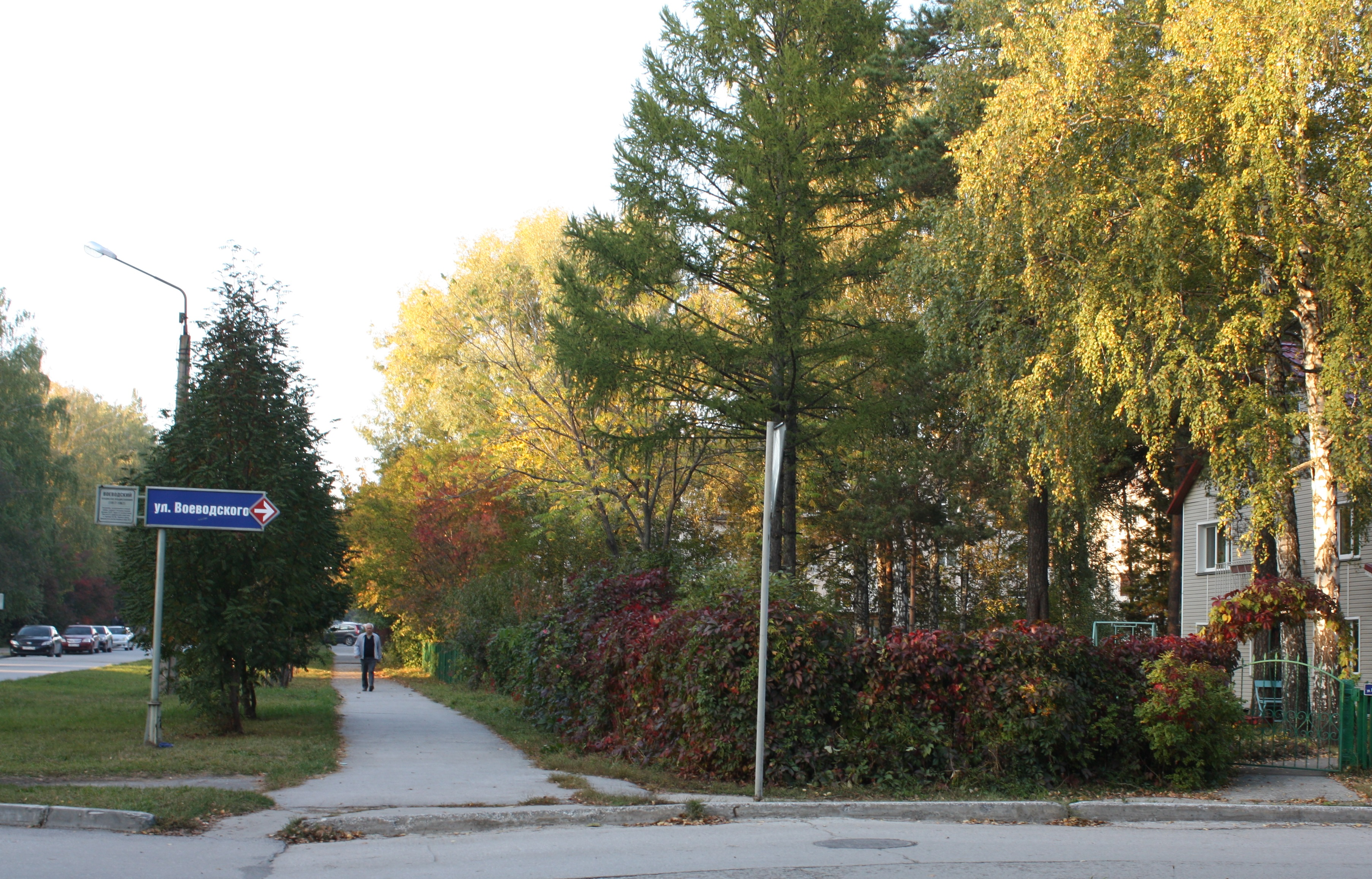

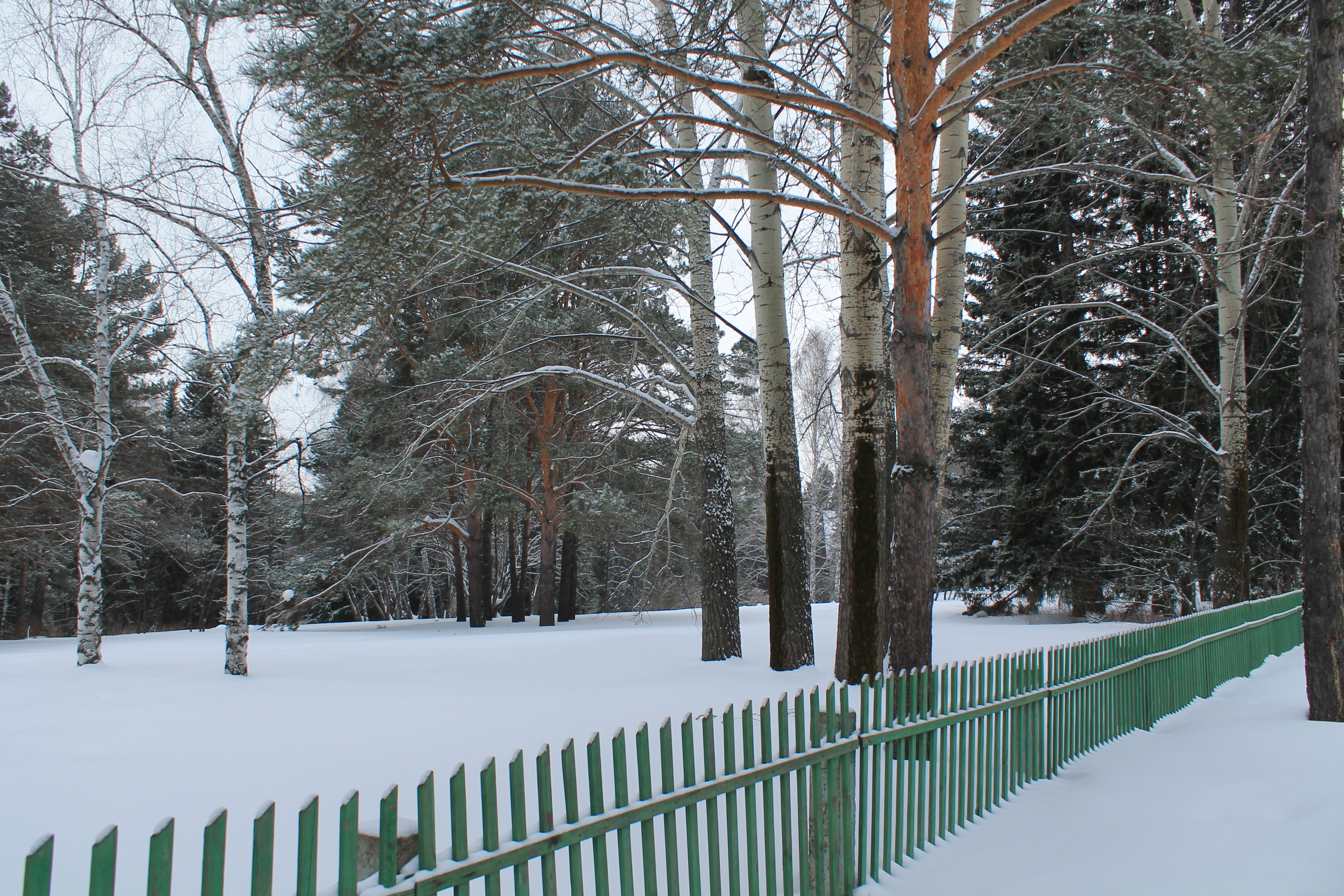

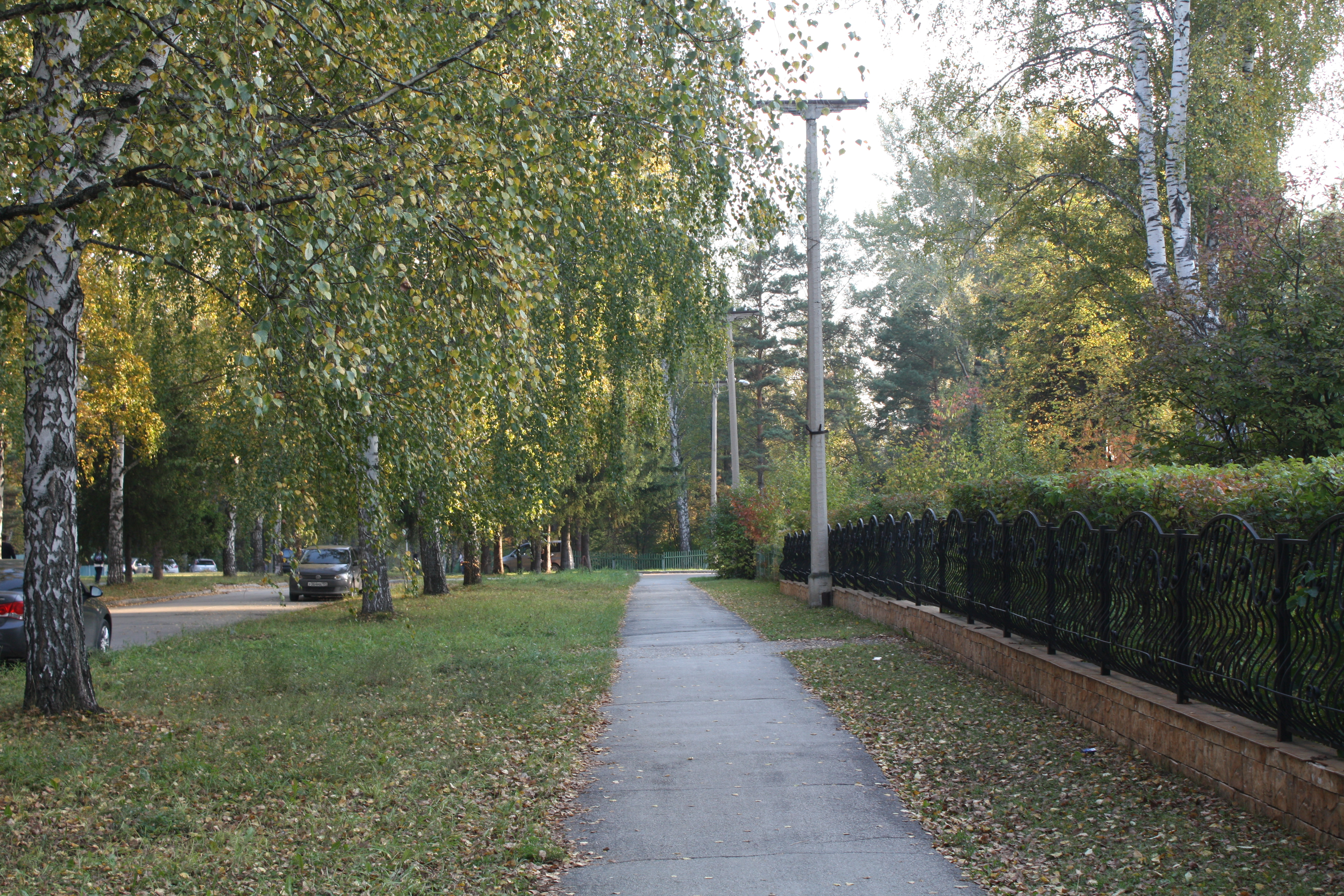

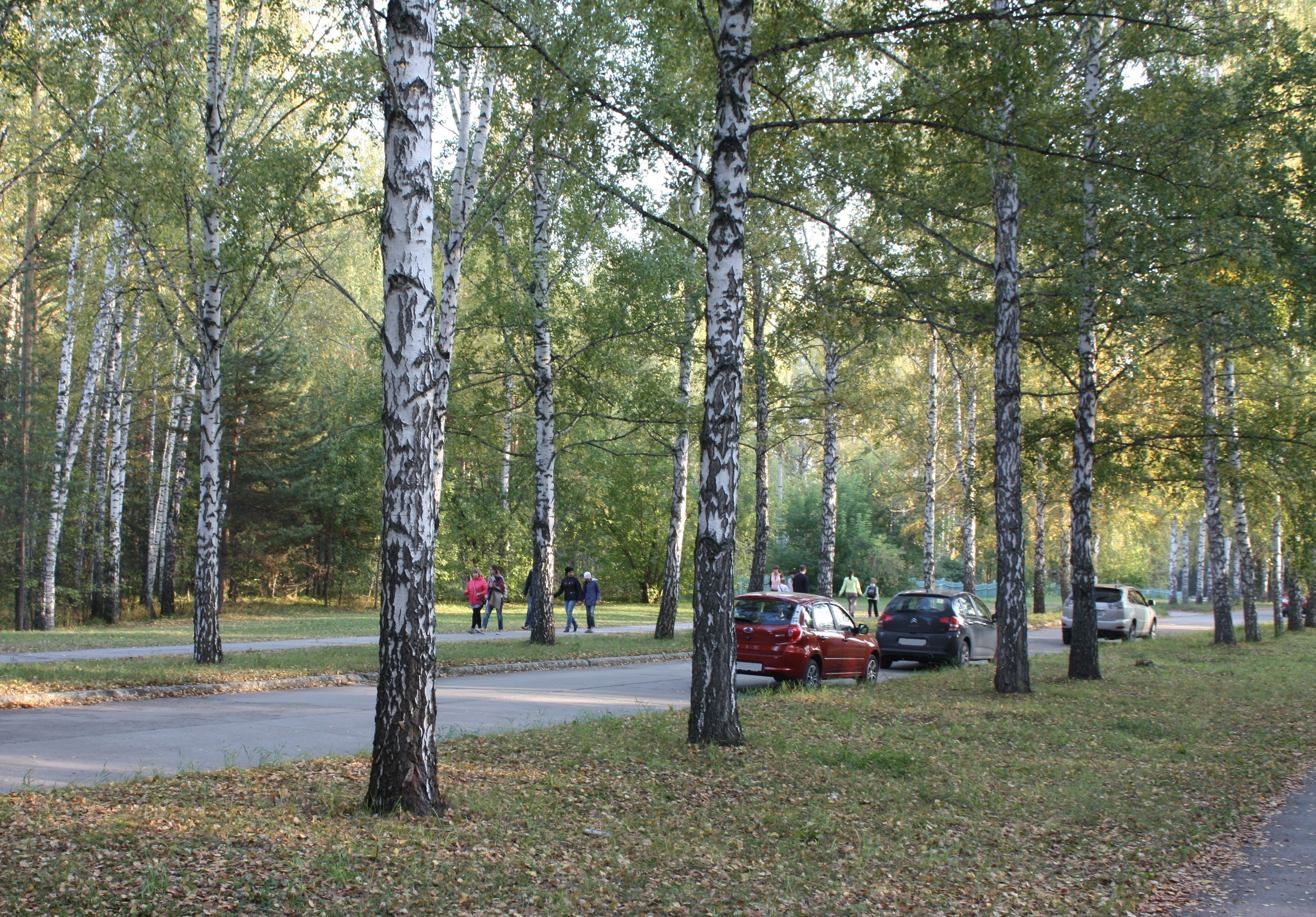

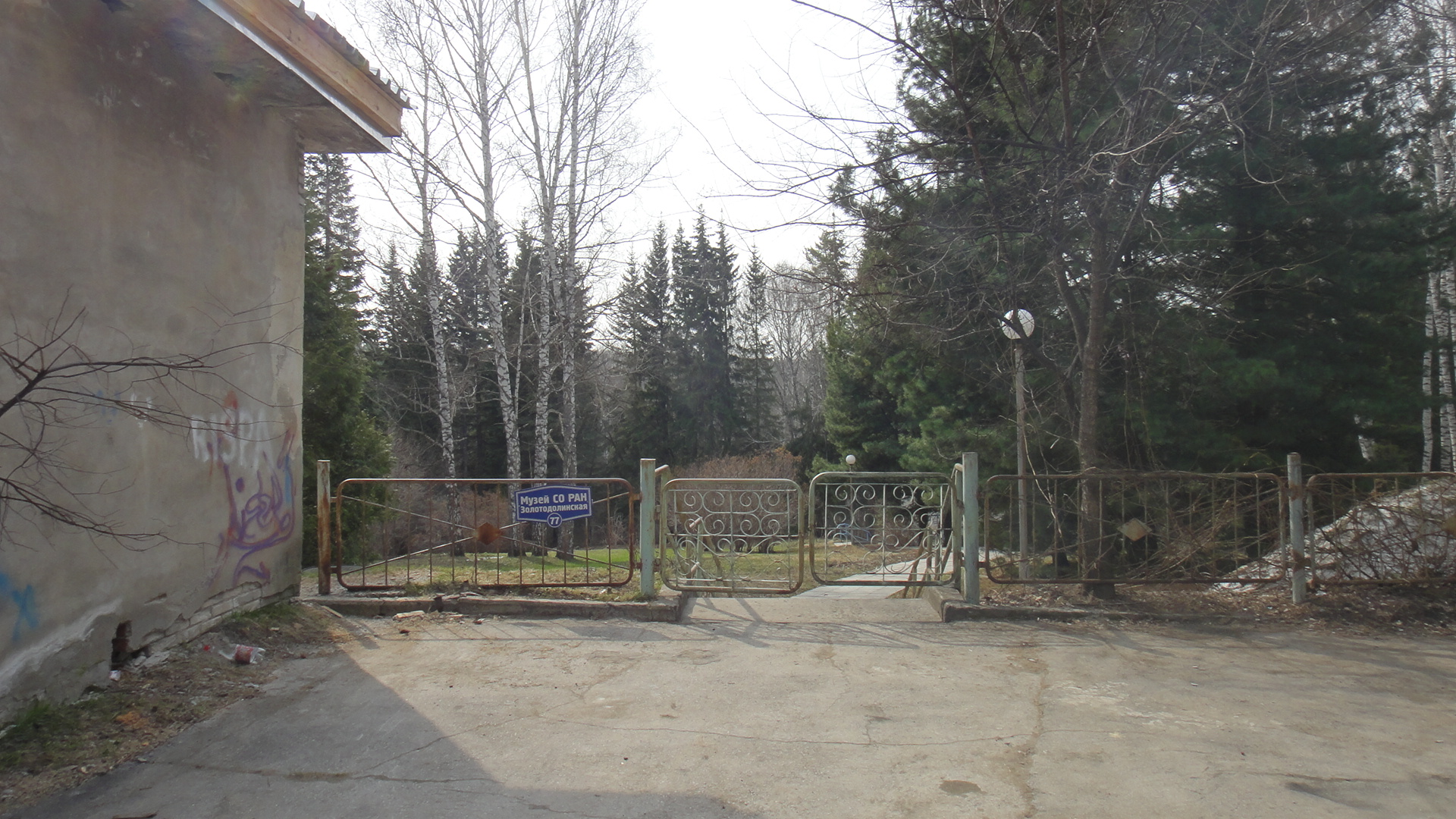

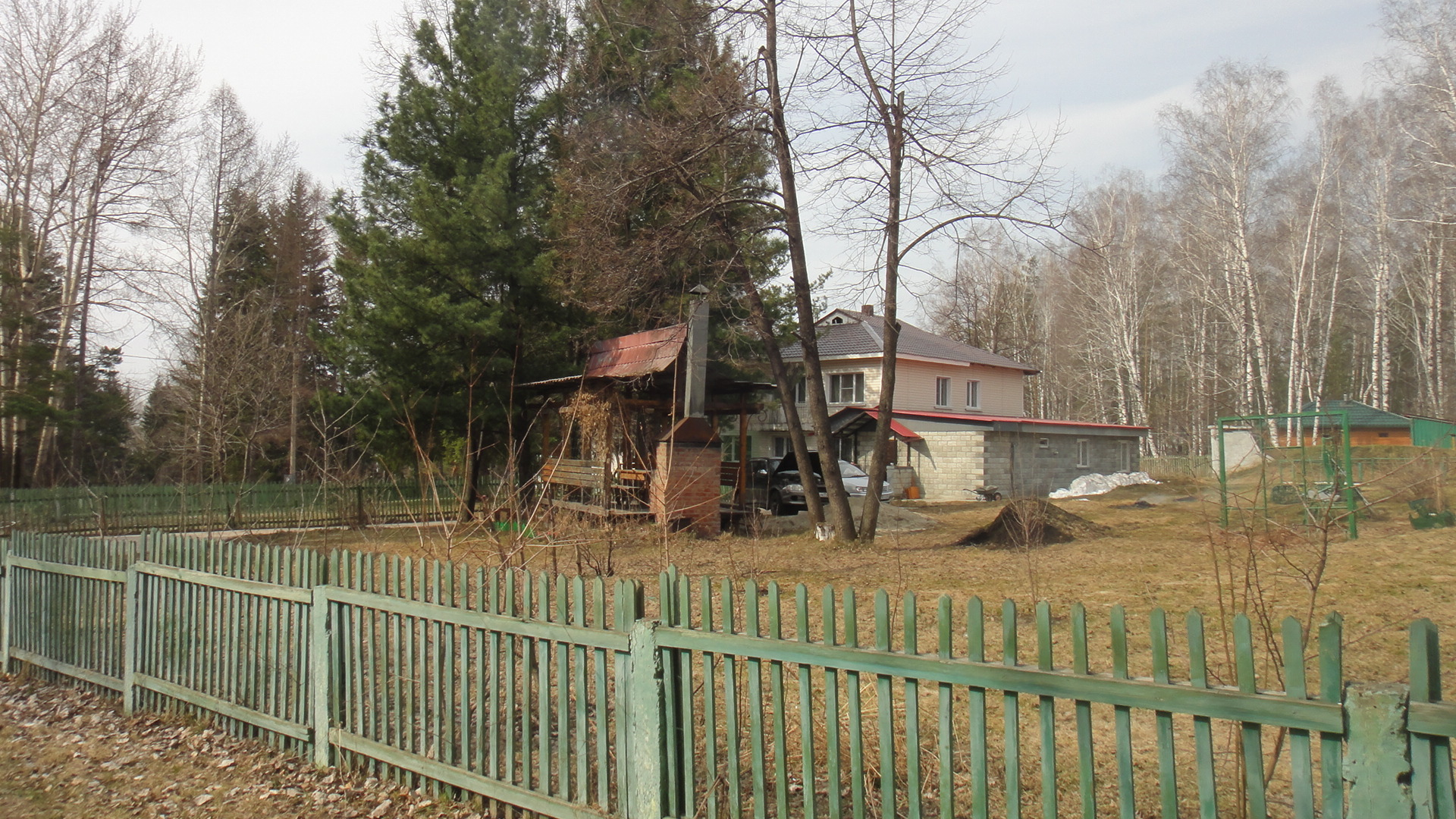

== Notable residents ==
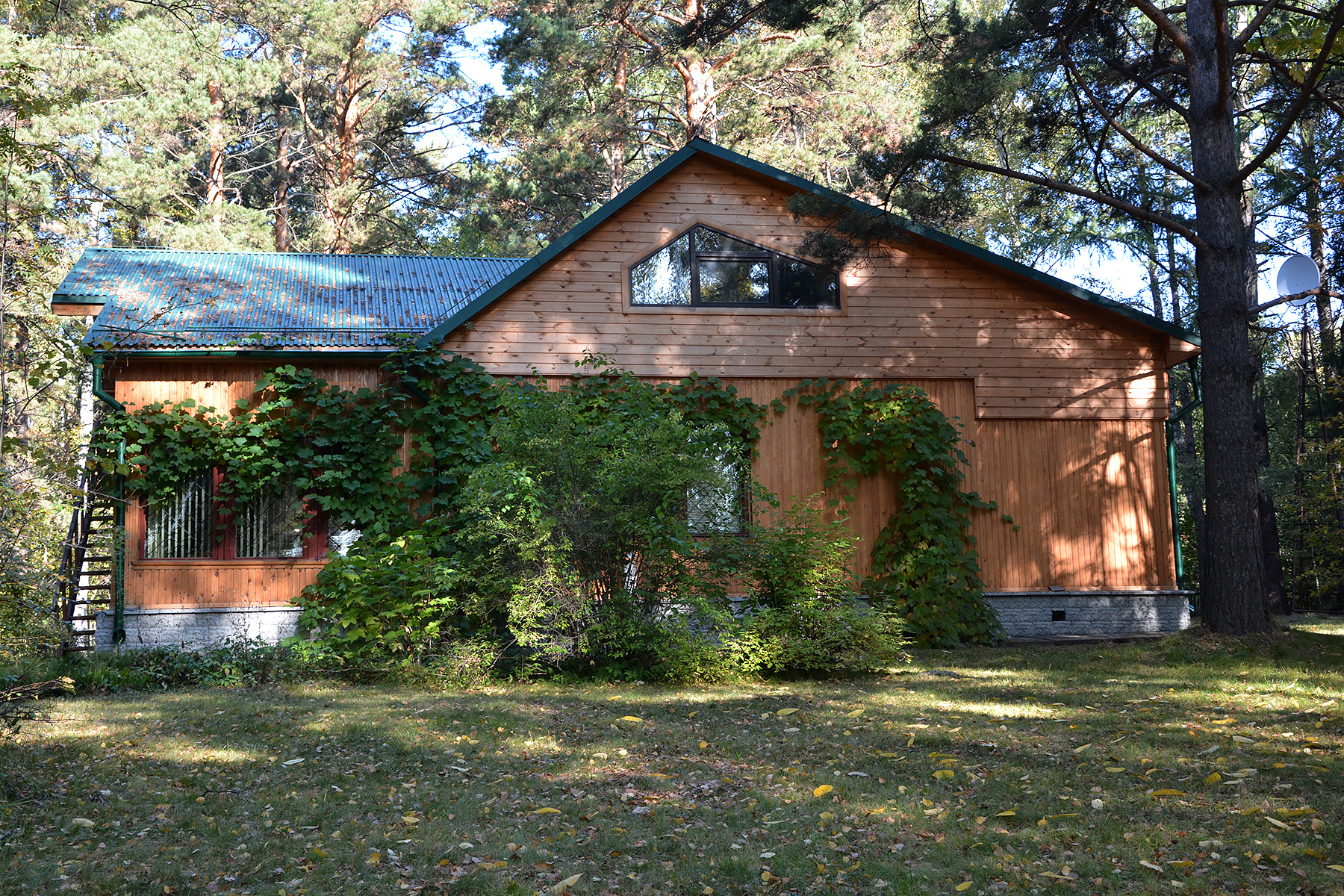
Lavrentyev's House

- Andrey Bitsadze (1916–1994) was a Soviet mathematician and mechanic.
- Anatoly Derevyanko (born 1943) is a Soviet/Russian historian and archaeologist.
- Vasily Fomin (born 1940) is a Soviet and Russian mechanic.
- Michail Ivanov (1945—2013) was a Soviet and Russian scientist in the field of applied mathematics.
- Mikhail Lavrentyev (1900—1980) was a Soviet mathematician and hydrodynamicist, founder of the SB RAS
- Mikhail Lavrentyev (1932–2010) was a Soviet and Russian scientist in the field of mathematical physics. The son of Mikhail Lavrentyev.
- Gury Marchuk (1925–2013) was a Soviet and Russian scientist in the fields of computational mathematics, and physics of atmosphere.
- Vyacheslav Molodin (born 1948) is a Soviet and Russian historian
- Valentin Monakhov (1932—2006) was a Soviet and Russian mathematician and mechanic, a specialist in the field of hydrodynamics.
- Lev Ovsyannikov (1919–2014) was a Soviet/Russian mathematician and mechanic.
- Pelageya Polubarinova-Kochina was a Soviet applied mathematician.
- Alexey Rebrov (born 1933) is a Soviet and Russian scientist in the field of physical gas dynamics, rarefied gas dynamics, thermal physics and vacuum technology.
- Alexander Skrinsky (born 1936) is a Russian nuclear physicist.
- Vladimir Vragov (1945—2002) was a Soviet and Russian mathematician.
- Nikolai Yanenko (1921–1984) was a Soviet scientist in the field of computational mathematics and fluid mechanics.

== Nature ==
- Central Siberian Botanic Garden
- Utinoye Ozero is a pond between Zolotodolinskaya and Maltsev streets.
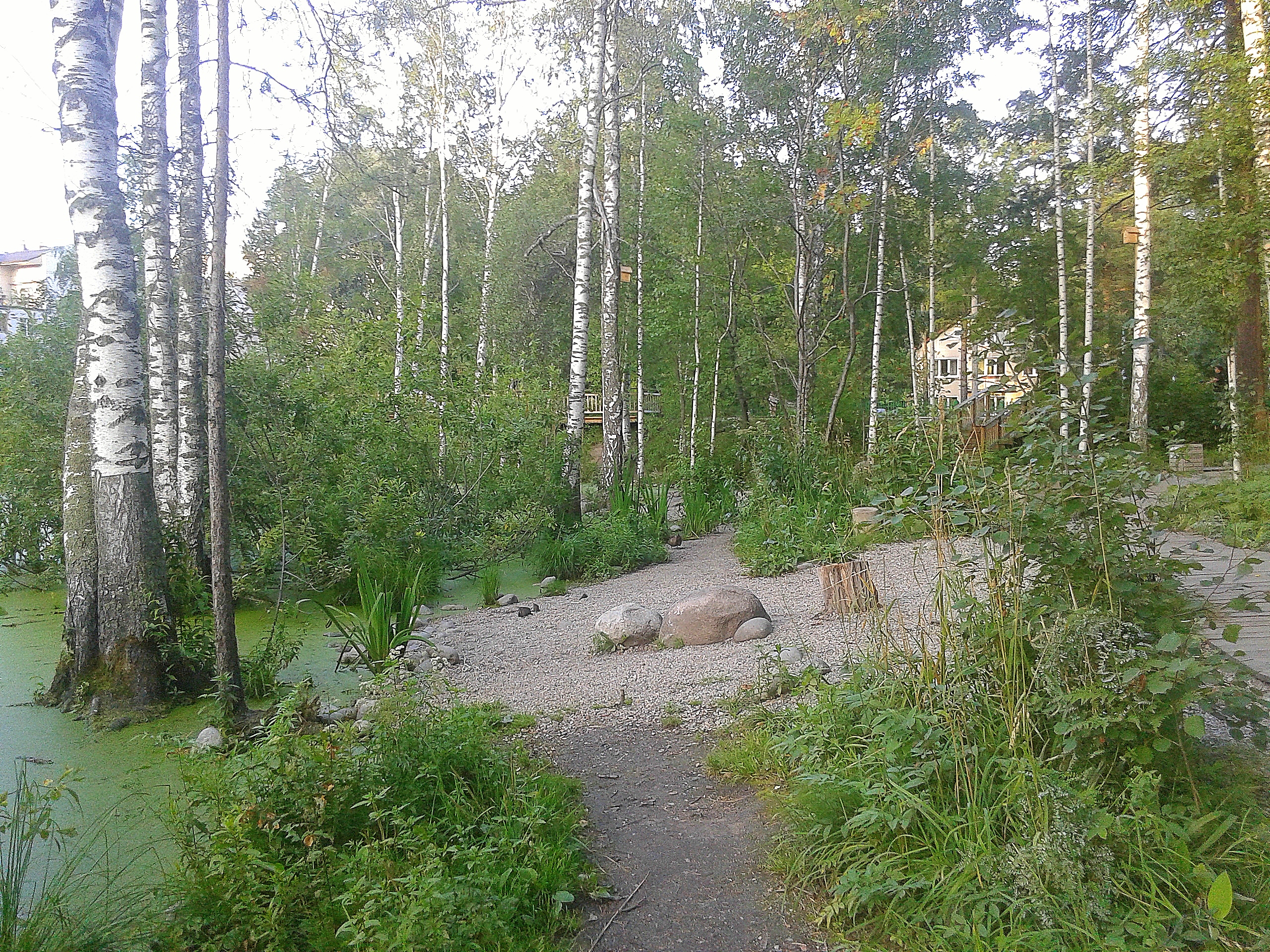

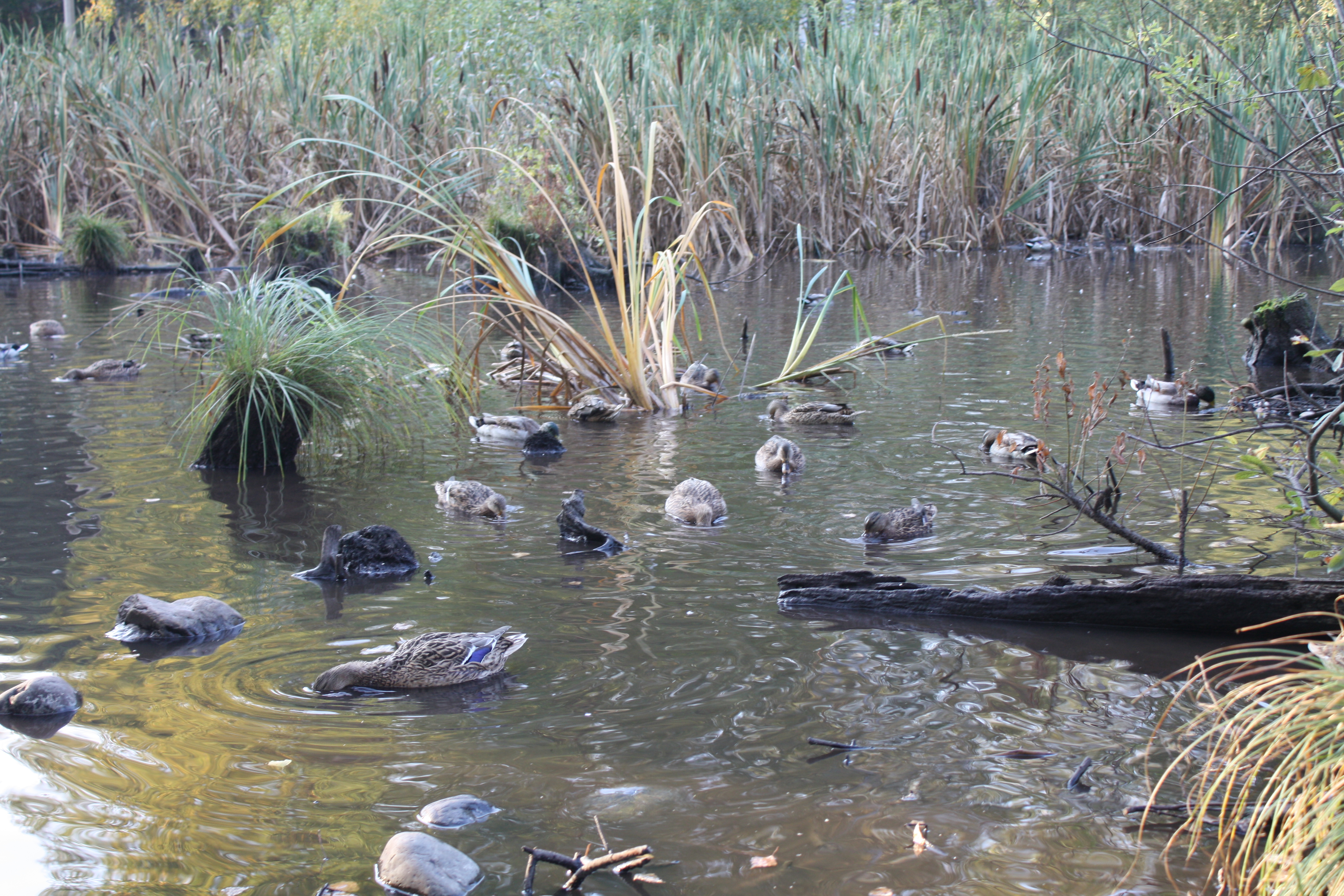

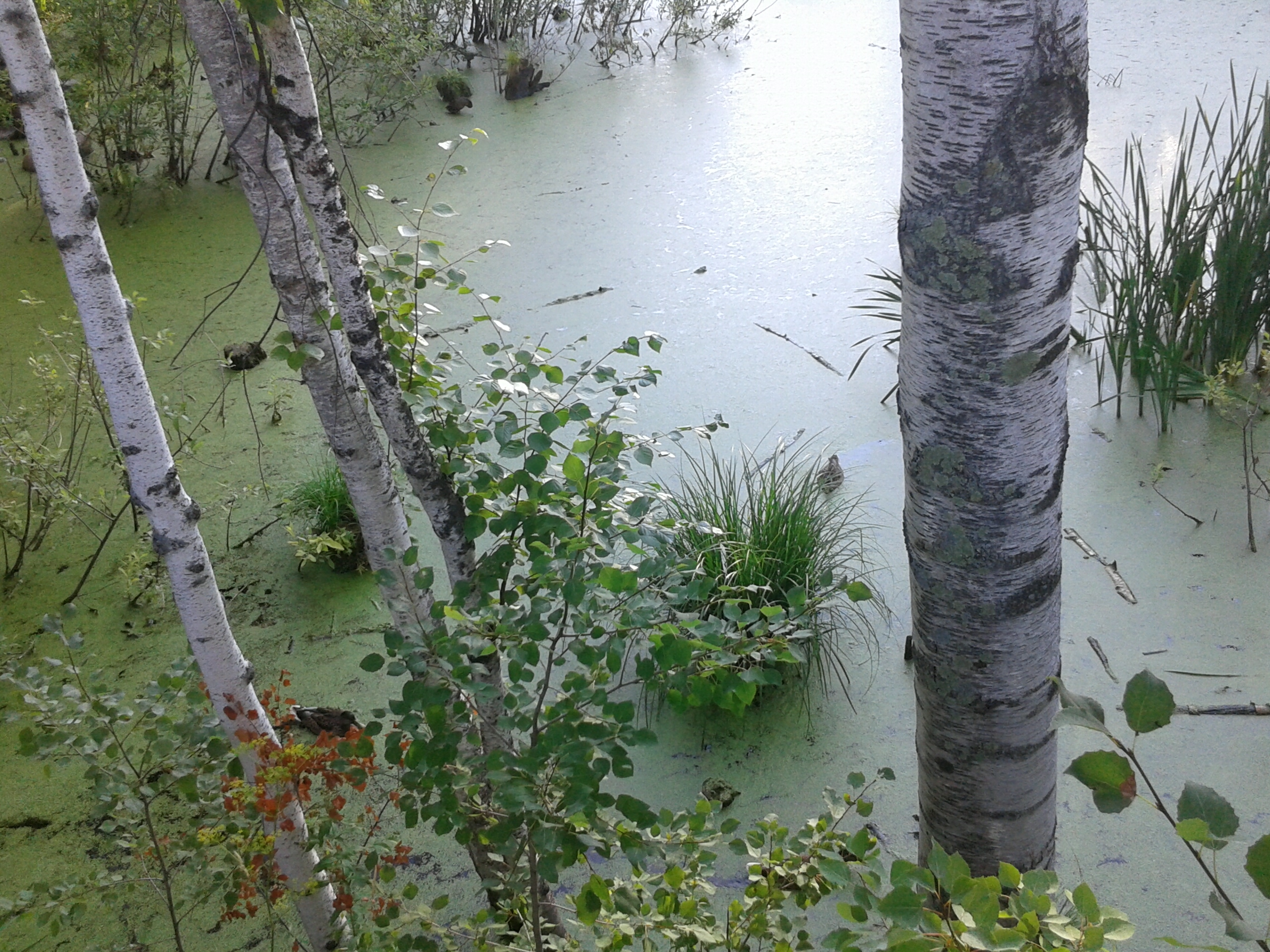

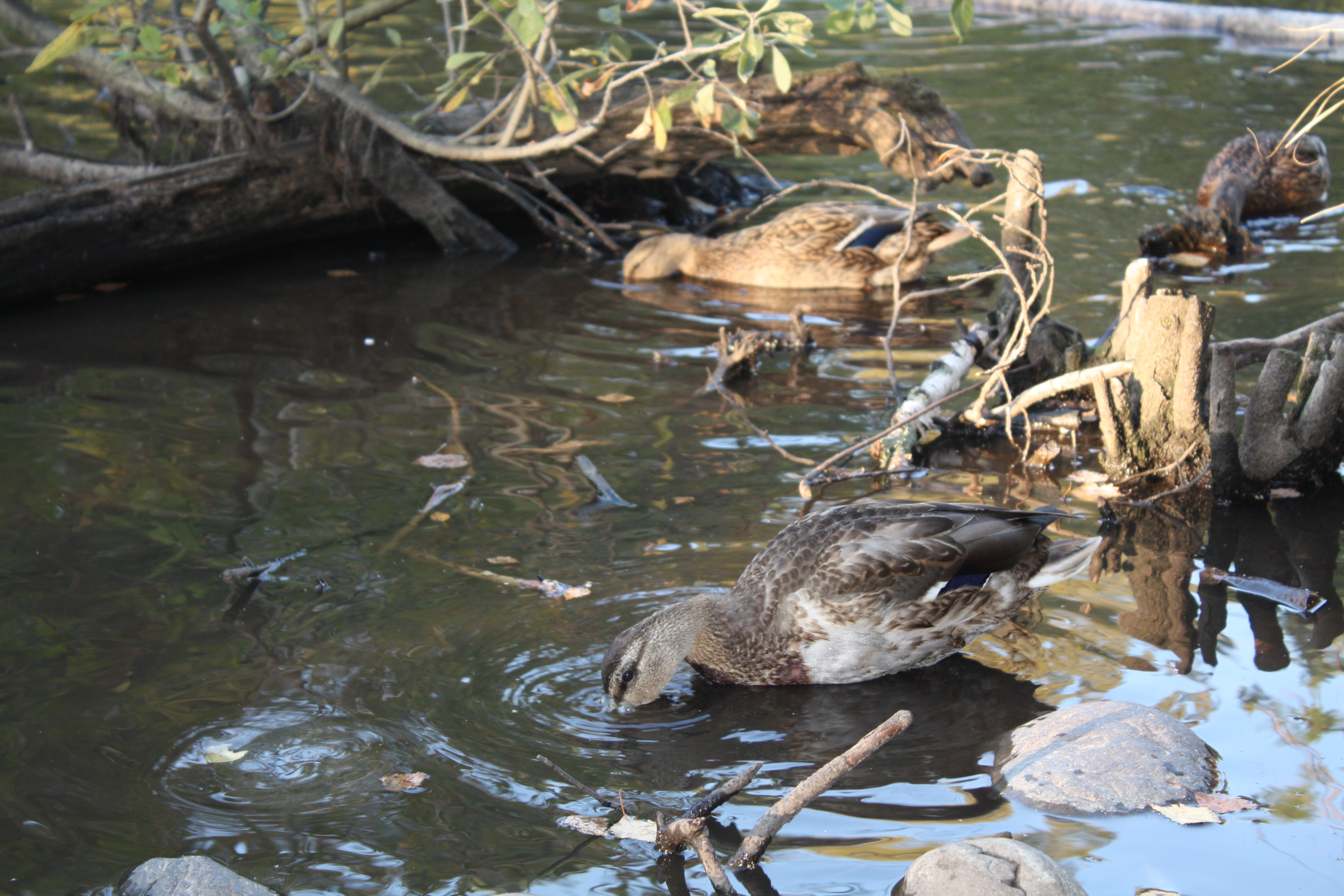

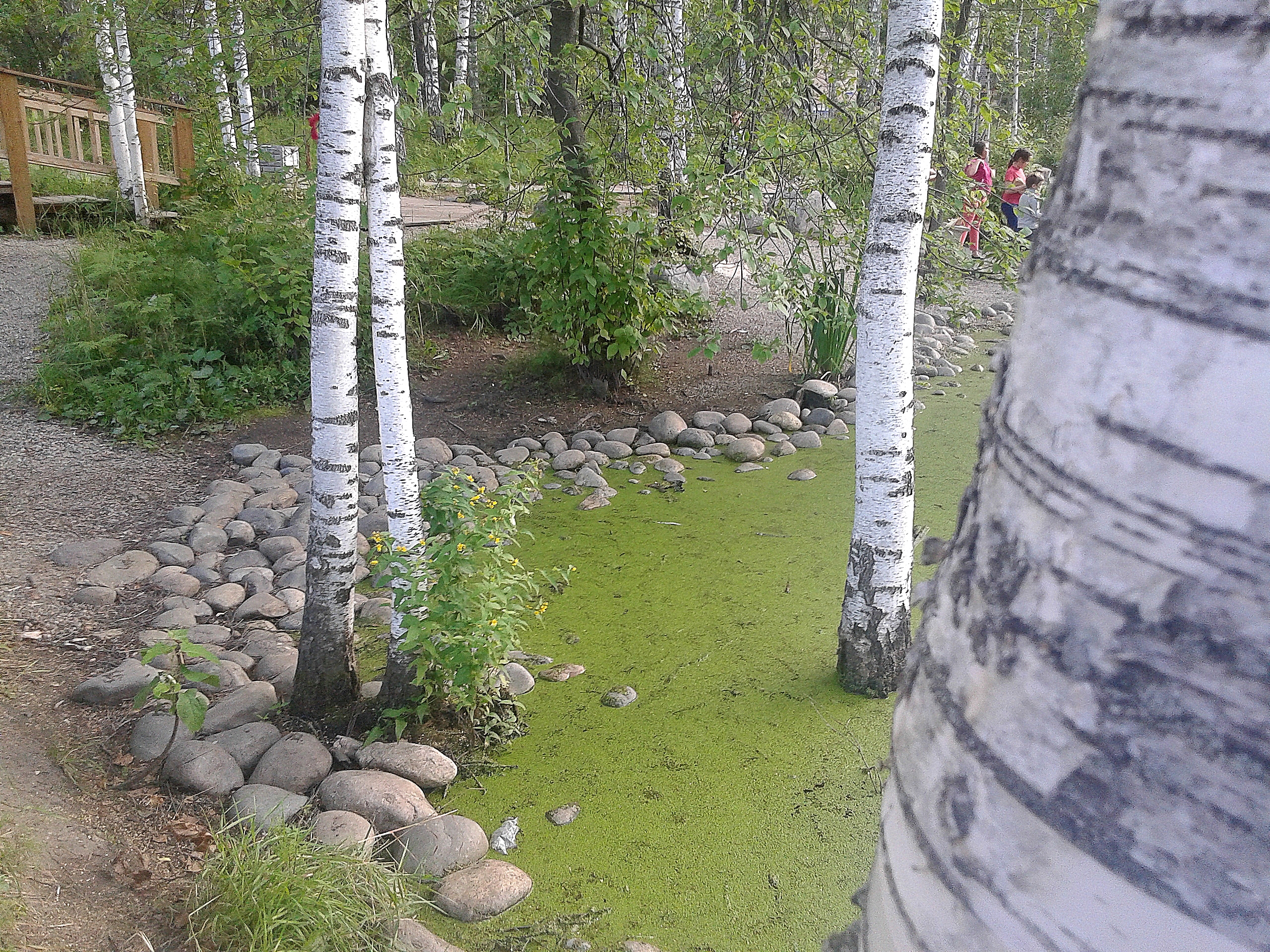
