= Morskoy Prospekt, Novosibirsk =

Street in Novosibirsk, Russia

Morskoy Prospekt
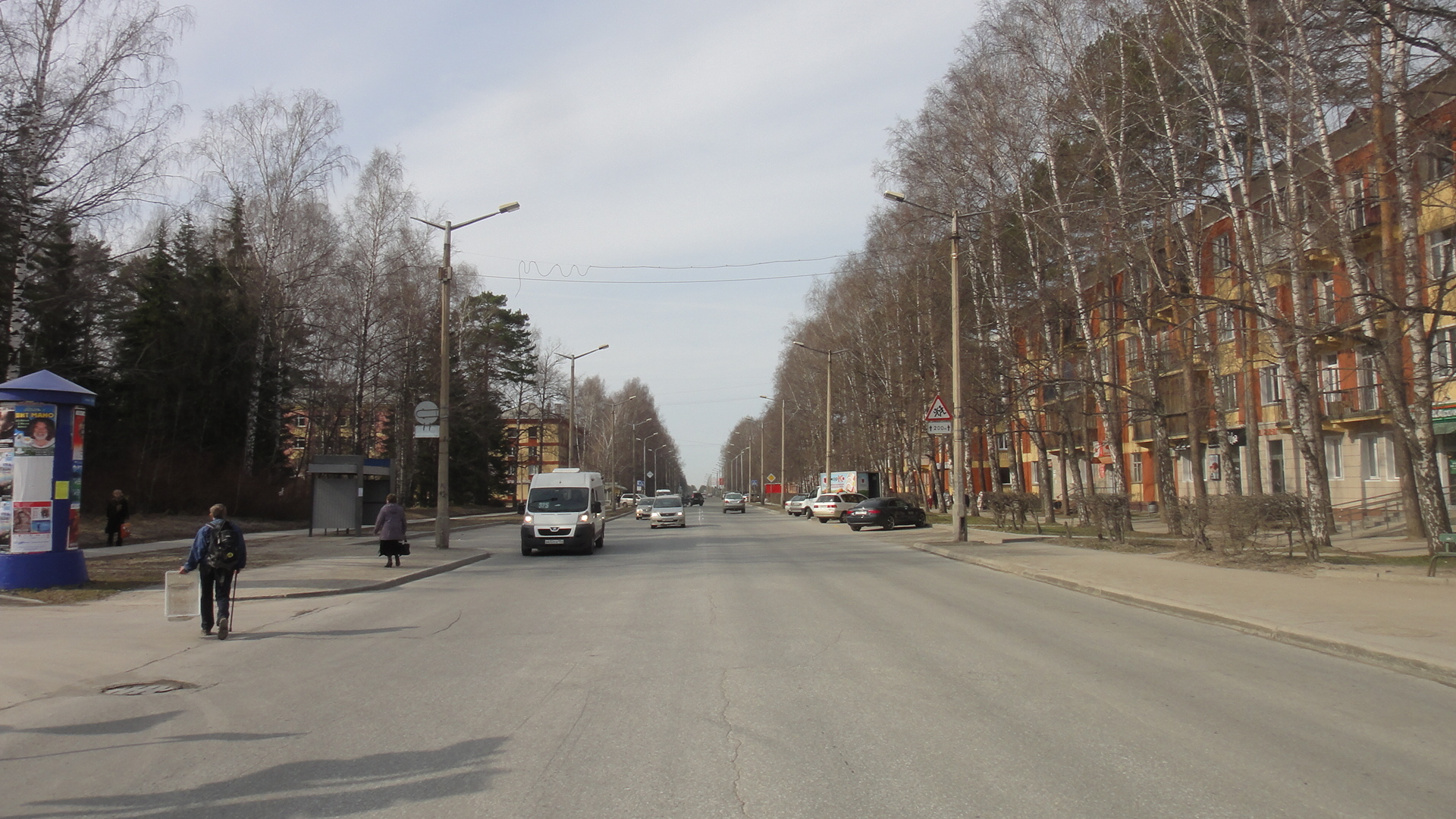
- Native name: Морской проспект (Russian)
- Location: Novosibirsk; Russia

Morskoy Prospekt or Morskoy Avenue (Russian: Морской проспект) is a street in the Akademgorodok of Novosibirsk, Russia. It is one of the central streets of the science city. The prospekt starts from the intersection with Academician Lavrentyev Avenue and Tereshkova Street, runs south-west and then forms a crossroad with Berdskoye Highway. Berdskoe Highway, a narrow strip of forest and a railway line separate it from the bank of the Novosibirsk Reservoir, popularly known as the Sea of Ob', hence the name (lit. 'Sea Avenue').

The streets adjacent to the prospekt: Detsky Proyezd, Zolotodolinskaya, Pravda, Ilyich, Uchyonykh, Maltsev and Zhemchuzhnaya streets.

== History ==
Street buildings were built in the late 1950s and 1960s.

In 1966, Charles de Gaulle visited Morskoy Prospekt. Residents of the avenue were on balconies and roofs of their houses and looked at the president of France.

Morskoy Prospekt was fully built in 1968.

In 1976, Swedish Prime Minister Olof Palme visited the street.

In 1983, Rajiv Gandhi visited the prospekt.

Morskoy Prospekt was the most expensive place to buy real estate in the city in 2014.

== Organizations ==
- The House of Scientists

== Gallery ==
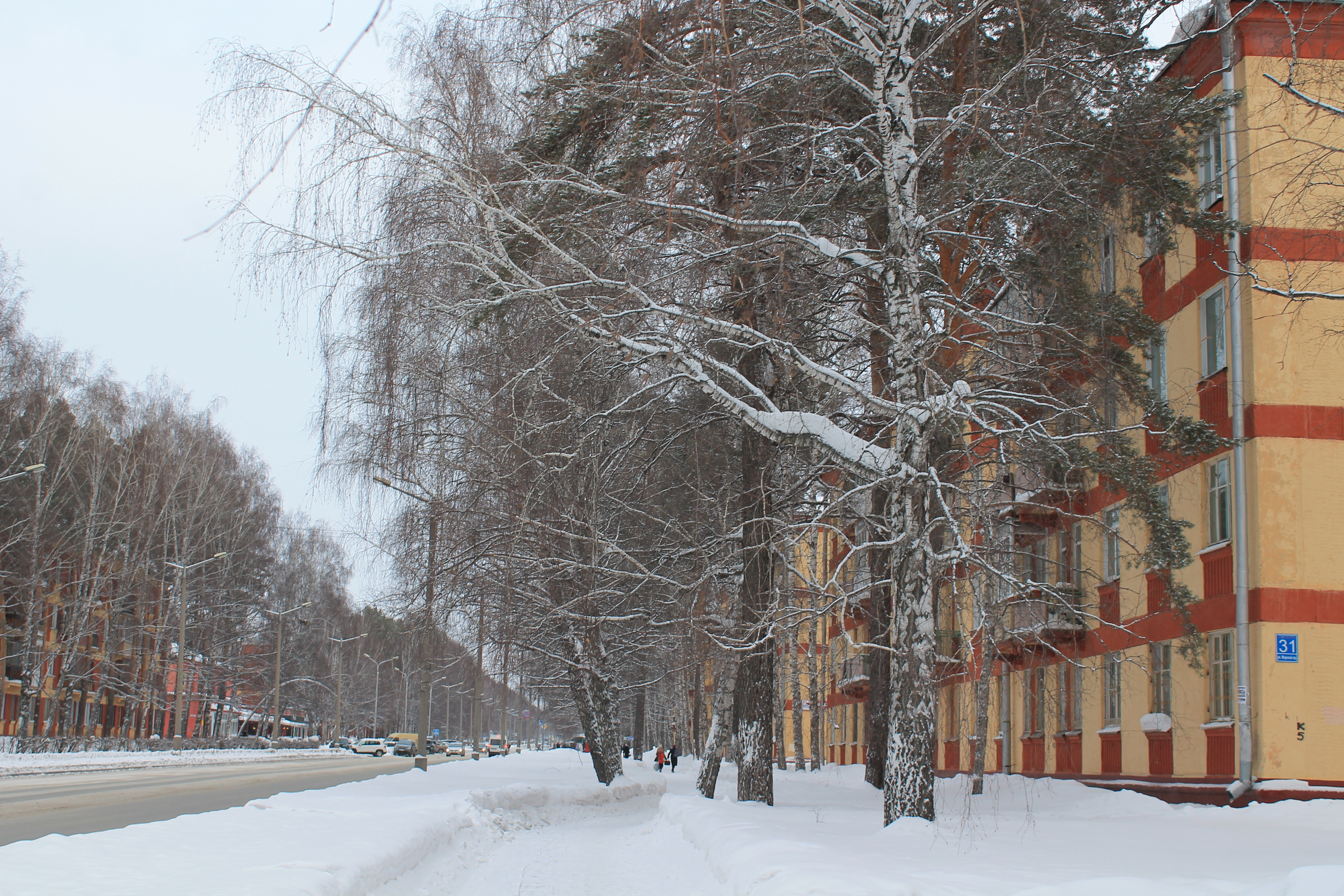

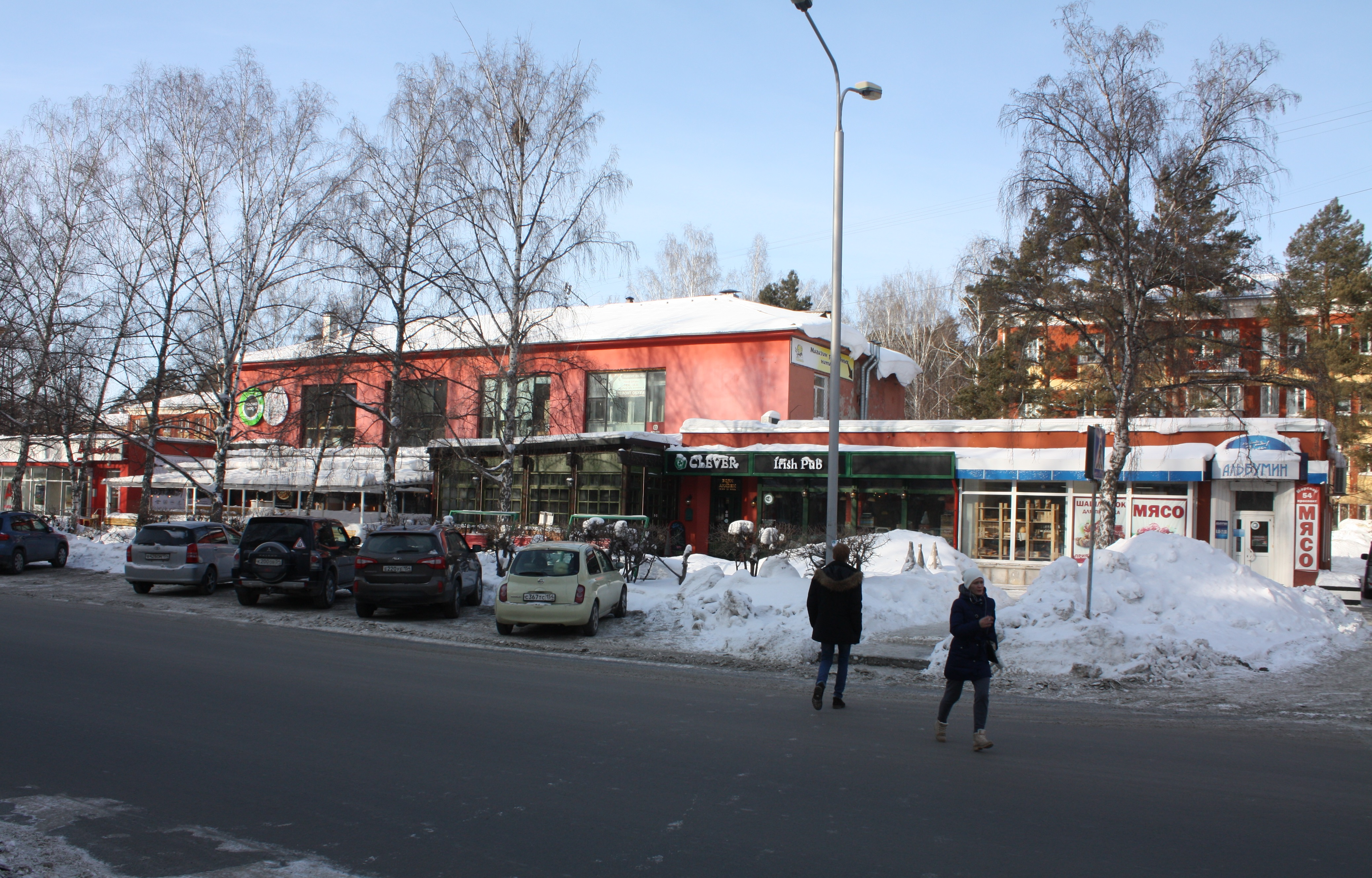

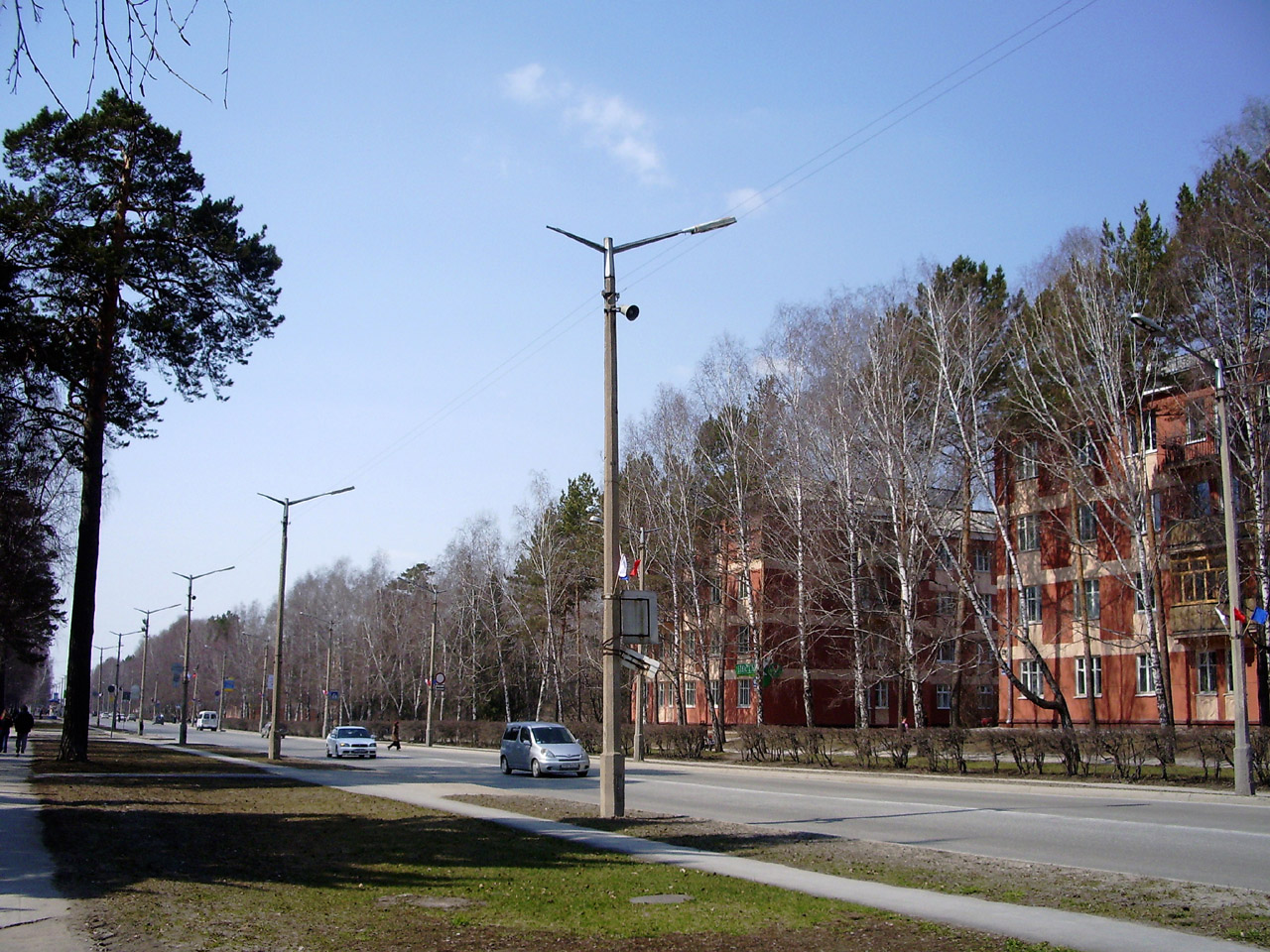

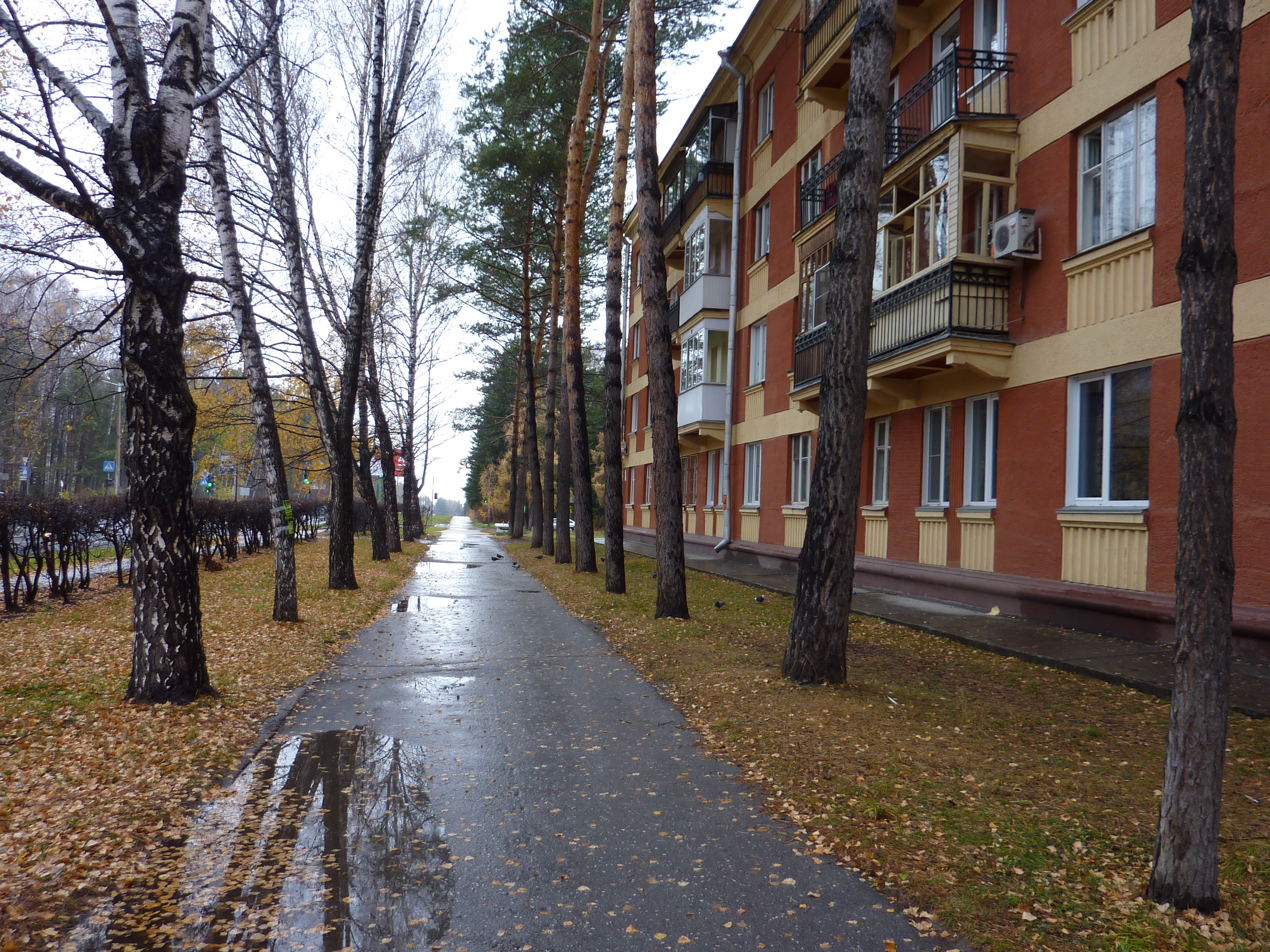

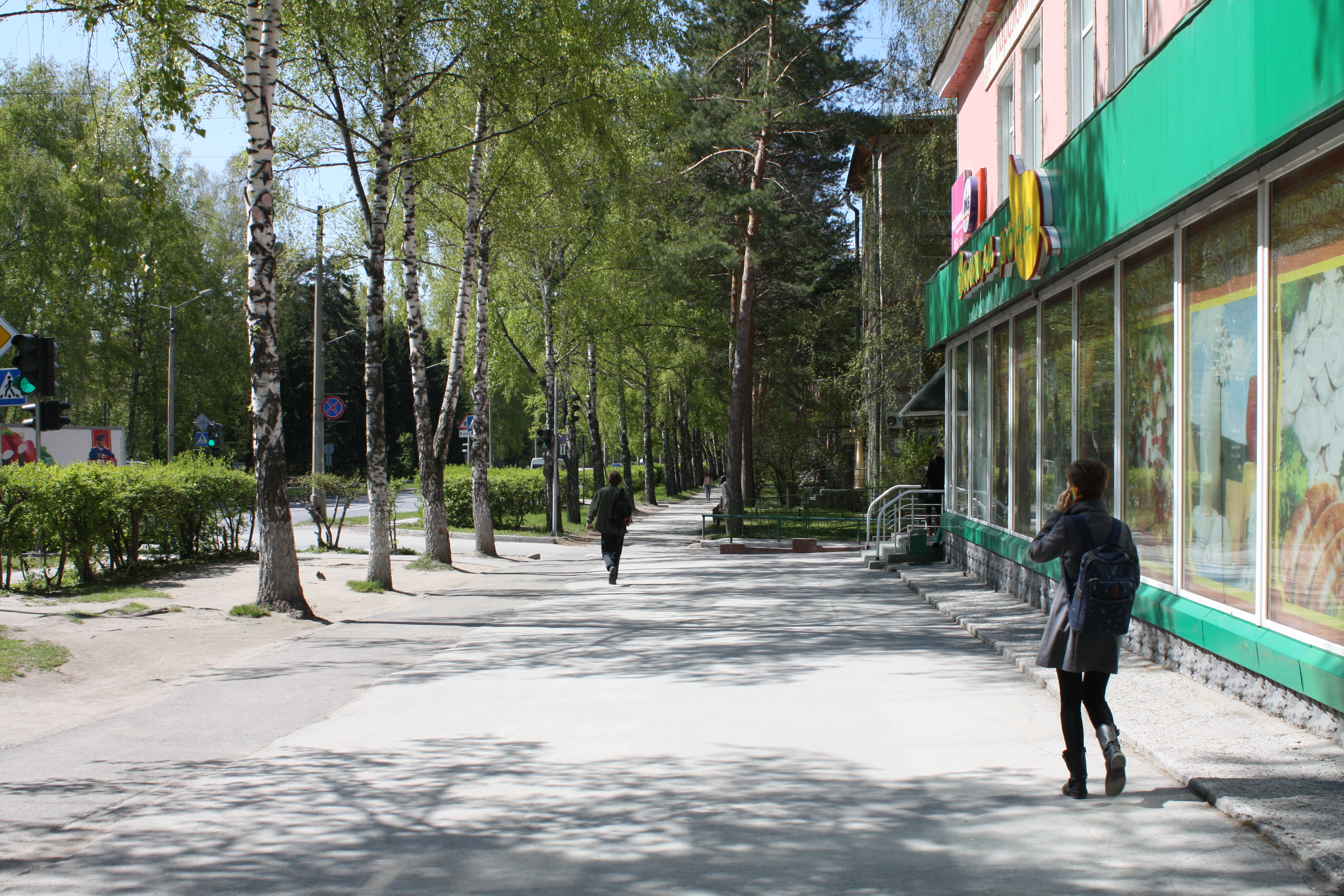

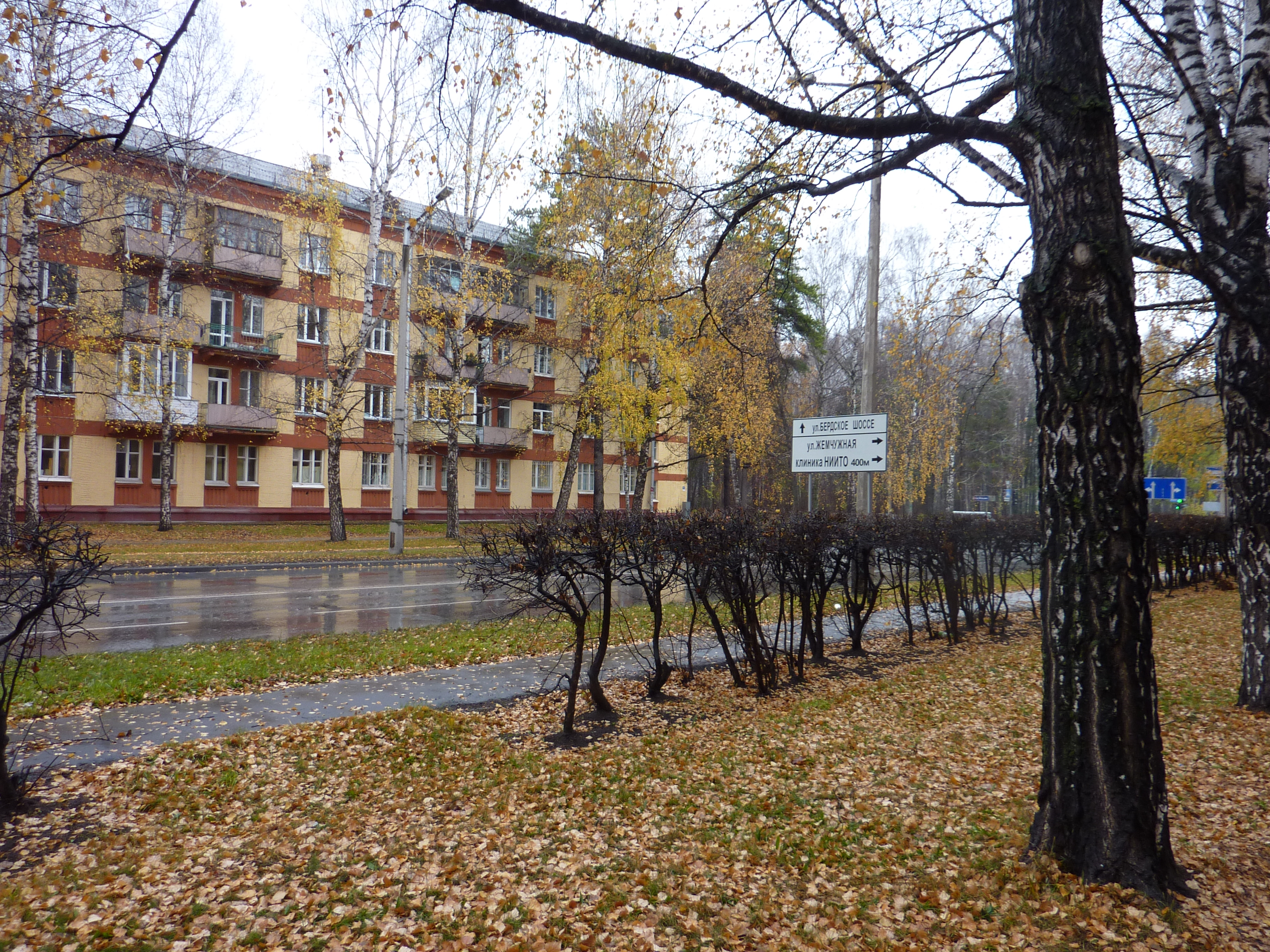

== Notable residents ==
- Boris Annin (born October 18, 1936) is a Soviet and Russian scientist in the field of solid mechanics.
- Leonid Aseyev (born September 24, 1946) is a Soviet and Russian physicist.
- Andrey Ershov (1931–1988) was a Soviet computer scientist, notable as a pioneer in systems programming and programming language research.
- Sergei K. Godunov (born July 17, 1929) is a professor at the Sobolev Institute of Mathematics.
- Leonid Kantorovich (1912–1986) was a Soviet mathematician and economist, Nobel Prize Laureate. He lived in the house number 44 from 1961 to 1963.
- Vladislav Pukhnachyov (born March 29, 1939) is a Soviet and Russian scientist in the field of continuum mechanics.
- Vladimir Teshukov (1946–2008) was a Soviet and Russian mechanics.
- Bohdan Voitsekhovsky (1922–1999) was a soviet scientist in the field of hydrodynamics and aerodynamics.
- Marlen Topchiyan (1934—2014) was a Soviet and Russian scientist in the field of explosives engineering.
- Nikolai Yanenko was a Soviet mathematician. He was known for his contributions to computational mathematics and fluid mechanics.
