= Sibers =

IT outsourcing company

Sibers Group Ltd.
- Type: Privately held company
- Industry: IT services IT consulting IT Outsourcing
- Founded: 31 July 1998
- Founder: Yuriy Bannov
- Headquarters: Akademgorodok, Novosibirsk, Russia
- Services: Information technology consulting services, solutions and outsourcing.
- Number of employees: 125 (2010)
- Website: www.sibers.com www.sibers.de www.sibers.ru

Sibers is an Information Technology Outsourcing company that is headquartered in Akademgorodok, Silicon Taiga, Russia. Currently, Sibers is one of the largest IT outsourcing companies in Russia with development offices located in Akademgorodok, Novosibirsk, Barnaul and Bishkek (Kyrgyzstan) and a total of 120 employees as of 2010. Sibers’ also has representatives located in Australia, Germany, and the United States.

The company operates under its registered trademark name HireRussians as well.

== History ==
Sibers was established in 1998 by graduates of the Novosibirsk State University mathematics program. Having determined to launch an IT venture, they joined forces to create a dedicated team of software developers and were subsequently employed by the American company, IWC (Interactive Web Concepts), thus forming the IWC Russian Division. The developers – 5 of them working in one office in Akademgorodok, Russia – completed projects provided to them by their single client, IWC. This was the team's first step to creating what soon became known as Key-Soft Ltd., and would later become Sibers. The founders started the company with an initial investment from their own savings.

In the late 1990s^{when?}, during the Dot-com Boom, 3COM Corporation bought IWC, including its Russian Division. It was at this time that all employees became official contract workers of the 3COM Corporation.

During the spring of 2001 the Russian team, now composed of ten employees, became an independent offshore software development company known as Key-Soft Ltd. This was the same year Key-Soft registered with Elance and created their own profile to gain their first independent contracts.

In 2005, in an effort to unite a circle of Russian software developers, Key-Soft created its virtual service outlet called HireRussians. Following ISO and CMM standards, Key-Soft delivered hundreds of projects for retail, oil/gas, security, finance, real estate, health care industries, education and entertainment for children and adults. The key market at this time was the United States only.

In 2006, Key-Soft was officially renamed "Sibers". The new name reflected the geographical location of the company and differentiated it from the numerous "xxx-soft" teams at that time. At the time, the company employed 70 developers and managers and continued to grow by widening its presence on Elance as well as other online and offline marketplaces. The company gradually continued to expand the range of key territorial markets to include Canada, England, France, and Scandinavia. In 2006, Sibers earned its first million dollars on Elance and became one of the site's top providers. After almost a year of consideration Sibers' trademark was registered for outsourcing in the field of software development in 2008 by USPTO. Sibers then entered the German IT market with a new regional website and solutions for Green IT in November 2008.
