= Ilyich Street, Novosibirsk =

Street in Novosibirsk, Russia

Ilyich Street
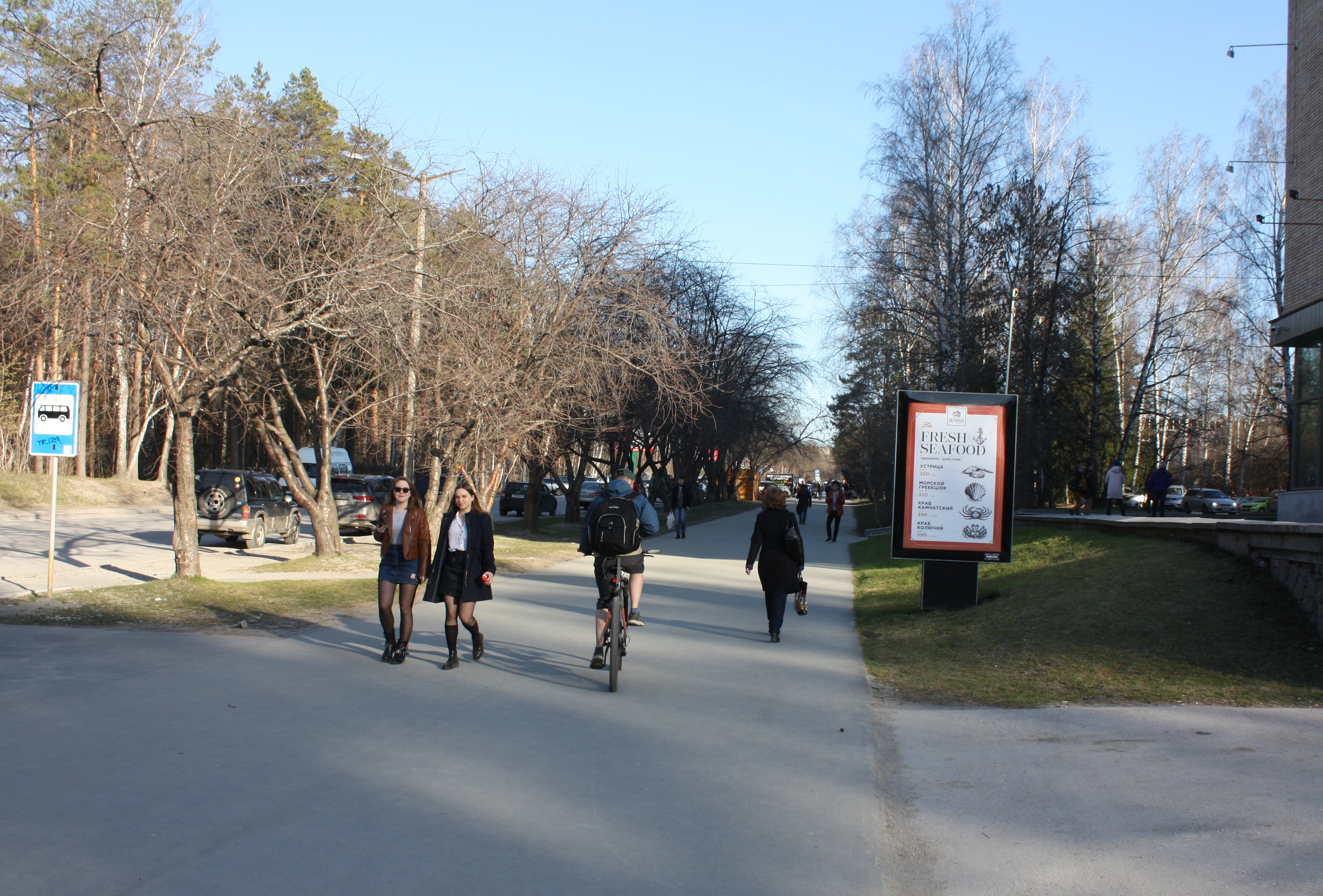
- Interactive map of Ilyich Street
- Native name: Улица Ильича (Russian)
- Location: Novosibirsk; Russia

Ilyich Street or Ilyicha Street (Russian: Улица Ильича) is a street in Akademgorodok of Novosibirsk, Russia. It starts from a T-shaped intersection with Morskoy Prospekt, runs north-west and then forms a crossroad with Universitetsky Prospekt, Pirogov Street and Vekua Footpath.

The streets adjacent to the street: Tsvetnoy Proyezd and Vesenny Proyezd.

== Architecture ==
- Akademia House of Culture is a building built in 1962.
- Shopping Complex of Akademgorodok is a public and shopping complex built in 1964. In 1967, the architectural project was awarded at the international exhibition in Monreal.
- Zolotaya Dolina is an eight-story hotel. It was built in 1966.

== Nature ==
A small stretch of forest is located along the odd side of the street. This forest is inhabited by ants (more than 300 anthills).

== Gallery ==
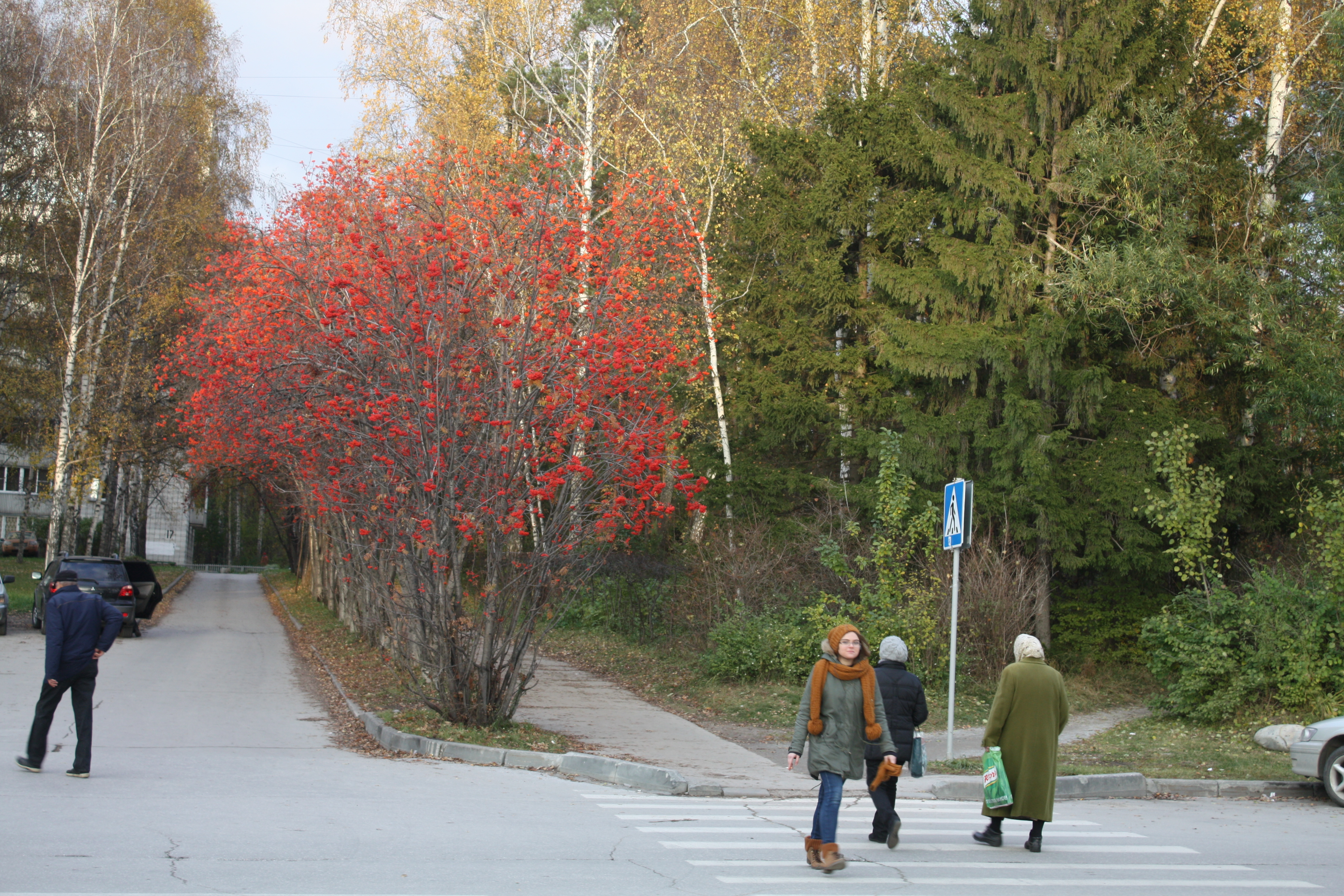

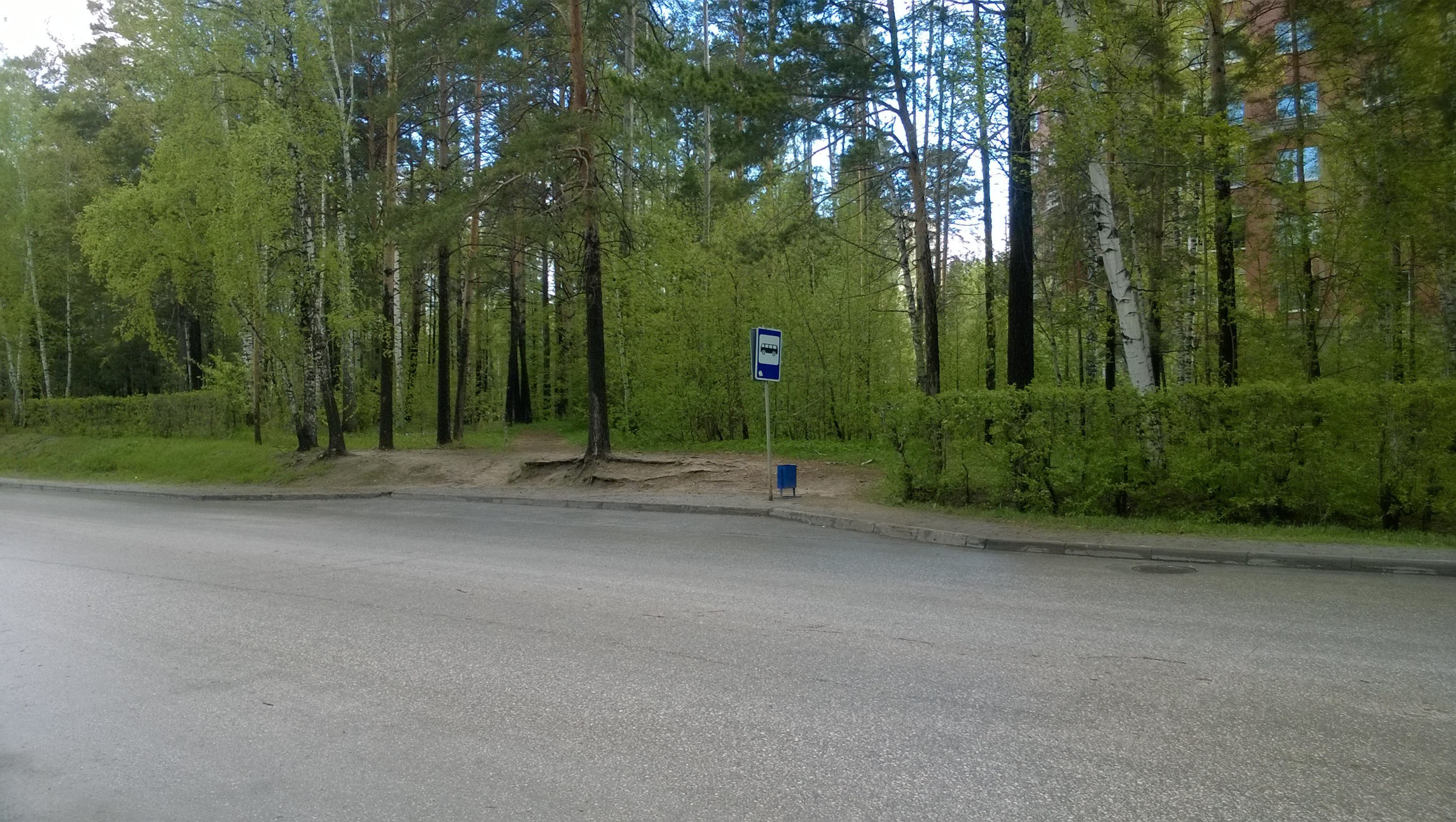

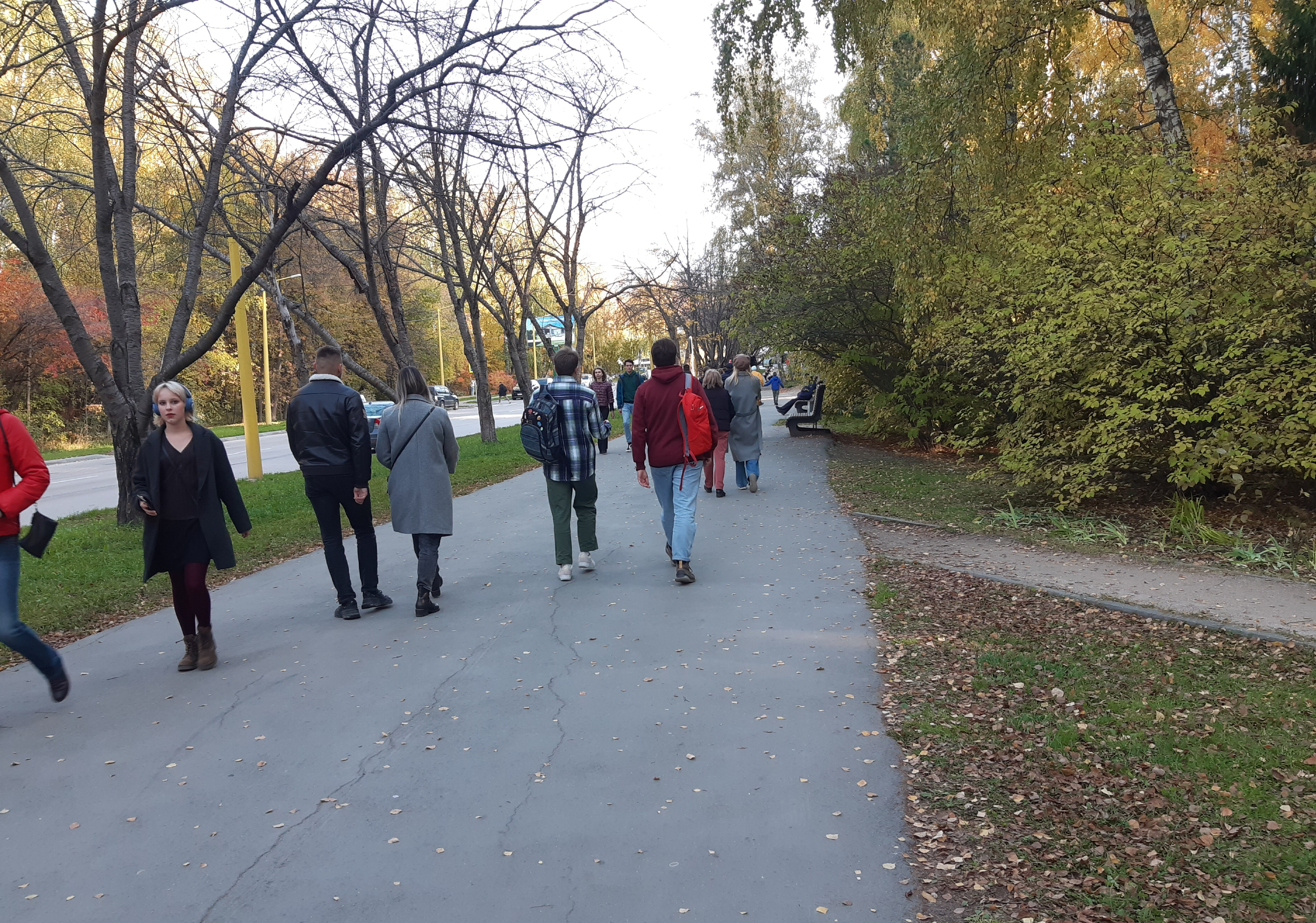

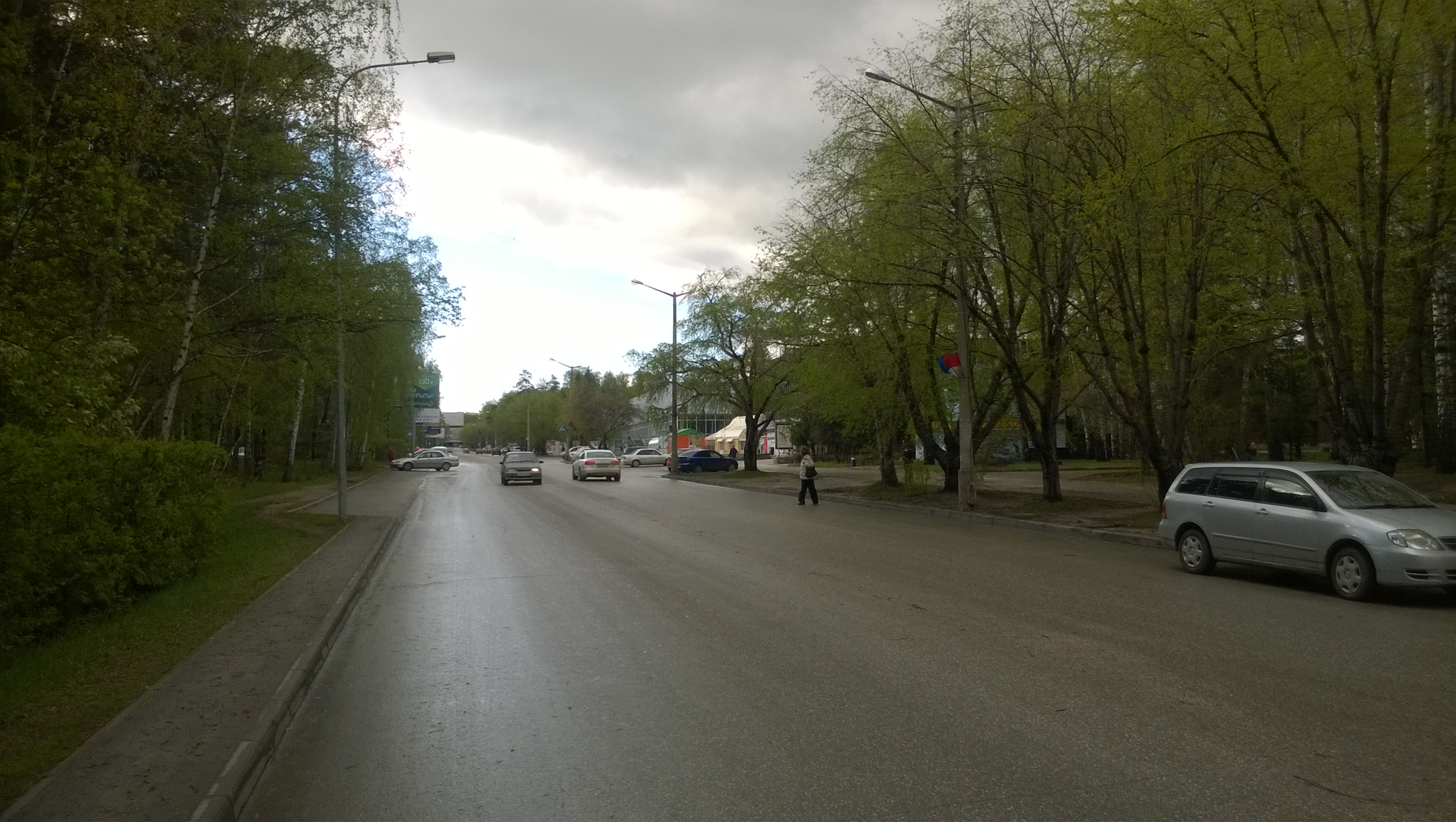
