= Vladimir Kvint =

American economist

Vladimir L'vovich Kvint
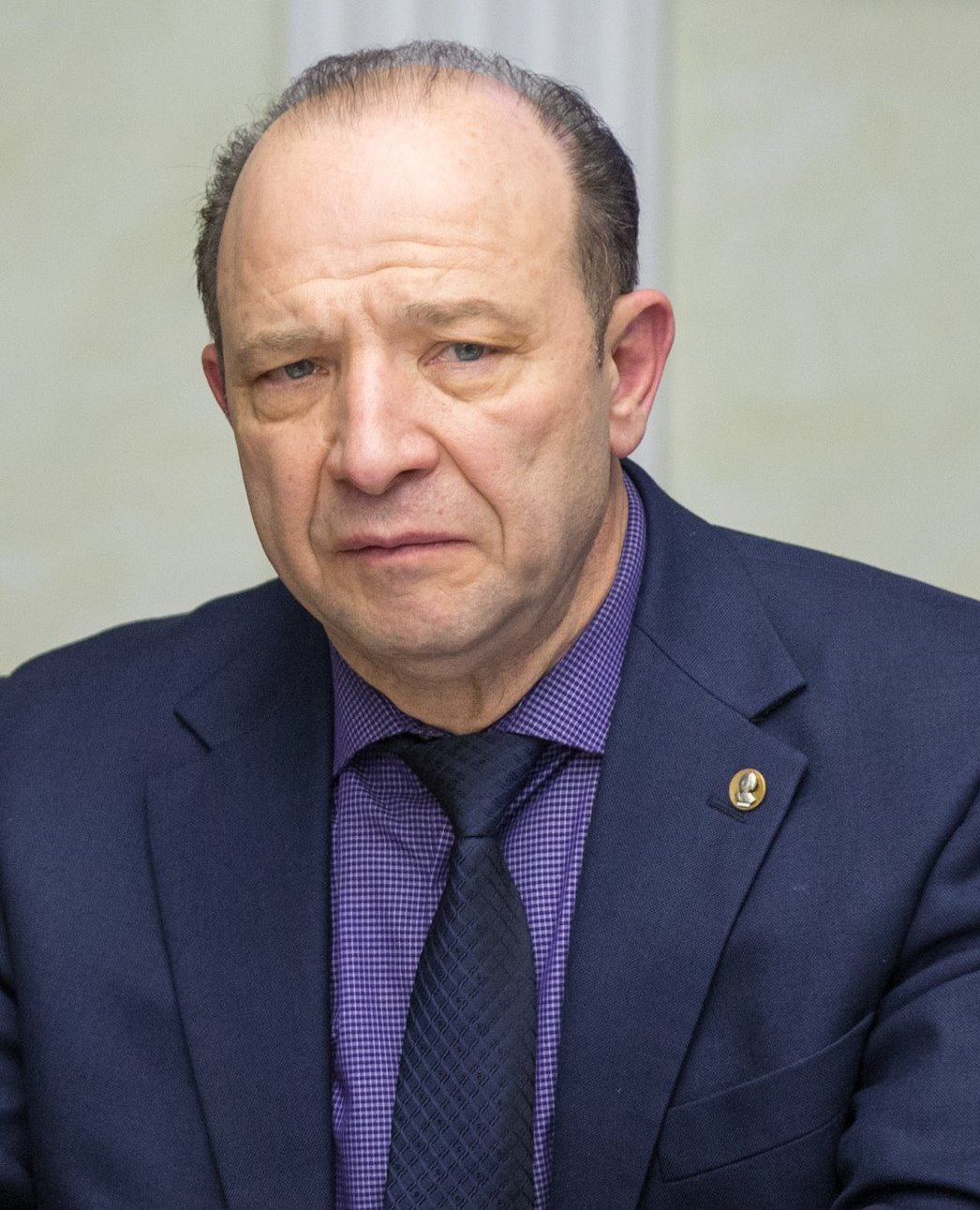
- Vladimir Kvint in 2016
- Born: 1949 (age 76–77); Krasnoyarsk, Russian SFSR, Soviet Union
- Known for: Theory of global emerging markets, strategy studies
- Awards: Order of Friendship, N.D. Kondratieff Medal, Lomonosov Prize, Fulbright Scholar Award

Academic background
- Education: Economics
- Alma mater: Plekhanov Russian University of Economics

Academic work
- Discipline: Economist

Vladimir L'vovich Kvint (Russian: Владимир Львович Квинт) is a Soviet-born Russian-American economist, and the Chair of the Department of Economic and Financial Strategy at the Moscow School of Economics in the Lomonosov Moscow State University. He is the President of the International Academy of Emerging Markets and a Foreign Member of the Russian Academy of Sciences.

== Early career in industry ==
=== Norilsk Nickel ===
Vladimir Kvint was born into a family of engineers in Krasnoyarsk, Siberia, in the Soviet Union. Between 1975 and 1978, he worked in the mining-metallurgical industry. He founded and served as Chief of the Department of Organization Management at the Norilsk Mining – Metallurgical Concern, later renamed Norilsk Nickel, which produces refined nickel.

== Later career in education and lecturing ==
=== Arctic Seaway Economic Expedition ===
In 1978, he was invited to join the Academy of Sciences of the Soviet Union and was elected Chief of the Department of Regional Problems of Scientific-Technological Progress at the Institute of Economy and Industrial Organization of the Siberian Branch of the USSR Academy of Sciences. The Siberian School of Economics was at that time led by economist Abel Aganbegyan and Nobel Laureate in Economics Leonid Kantorovich.

In 1979, the chairman of the Siberian branch of the academy appointed him to head these expeditions. Some of these expeditions included a journey across the eight seas of the Arctic Seaway by ship, helicopter, and SUV in 1980, and another trip through three seas along the Pacific Coast of Russia to evaluate the area's natural resources and productive forces.

=== Research at the Russian Academy of Sciences (Moscow) ===
In 1986, he presented a report on the organization of strategic development of the scientific-technological process to the Council of Ministers of the Soviet Union, arguing that without activating certain factors and functions of motivation, the Soviet Union would face economic difficulties. Following this, Kvint faced pressure from the Soviet power structure.

In 1985, Kvint prepared his second Doctoral dissertation on the "Regional Management of the Scientific-Technological Development of the National Economy". His recommendations included the potential decentralization of the Soviet command economy. He was not allowed to present his dissertation to the Scientific Council until February 1988. In 1989, he received the lifetime title of "Professor of Political Economy." In 2011, by decree of the President of the Russian Federation, he was awarded the title of "Honored Professor of Higher Education of the Russian Federation."

=== Professorship in the United States ===
Kvint's first professorship in the United States was in the international economics department at Babson College in Massachusetts. From 1990 to 2004, Kvint was a Professor of Management Systems and International Business at Fordham University's Gabelli School of Business. Until 2000, he was also an adjunct professor of Business Strategy at the Stern School of Business at New York University for five years. Between 2004 and 2007, he was a Professor of International Business at the Kogod School of Business of American University in Washington, D.C. He taught courses including fundamentals of international business, the global marketplace, export-import management, comparative management systems, and developed a global emerging market course for Honors Program students. Between 2005 and 2016, Kvint was an adjunct professor of International Business Strategy at La Salle University in Pennsylvania.

== Awards ==
In 1992, Kvint was awarded a two-year scholarship by the Wexner Heritage Foundation, and in 1993, he received the Faculty Scholarship Award from the University of Southern California. The New England Center for International and Regional Studies awarded Kvint the title of Honorary Fellow in 1997.

In 2001, as a U.S. Fulbright Scholar Award recipient, Kvint conducted studies and lectured at the University of Vlore and the University of Tirana in Albania, as well as provided consultations to the government of Albania.

On September 20, 2006, by decree of the President of the Russian Federation, Kvint was awarded the Order of Friendship.

In 2010, he received the Gold Kondratiev Medal, issued every three years "For Achievements in Social Studies," by the International N. D. Kondratieff Foundation and the Russian Academy of Natural Sciences (RAEN).

In 2022, Kvint became a Laureate of the State Prize of the Republic of Uzbekistan in the Field of Science and Technology for the Research Monograph "The Strategic Leadership of Amir Timur: Comments on the Code".

== See also ==
- Emerging markets
