= Nikolaev Institute of Inorganic Chemistry =

Research institute in Novosibirsk, Russia

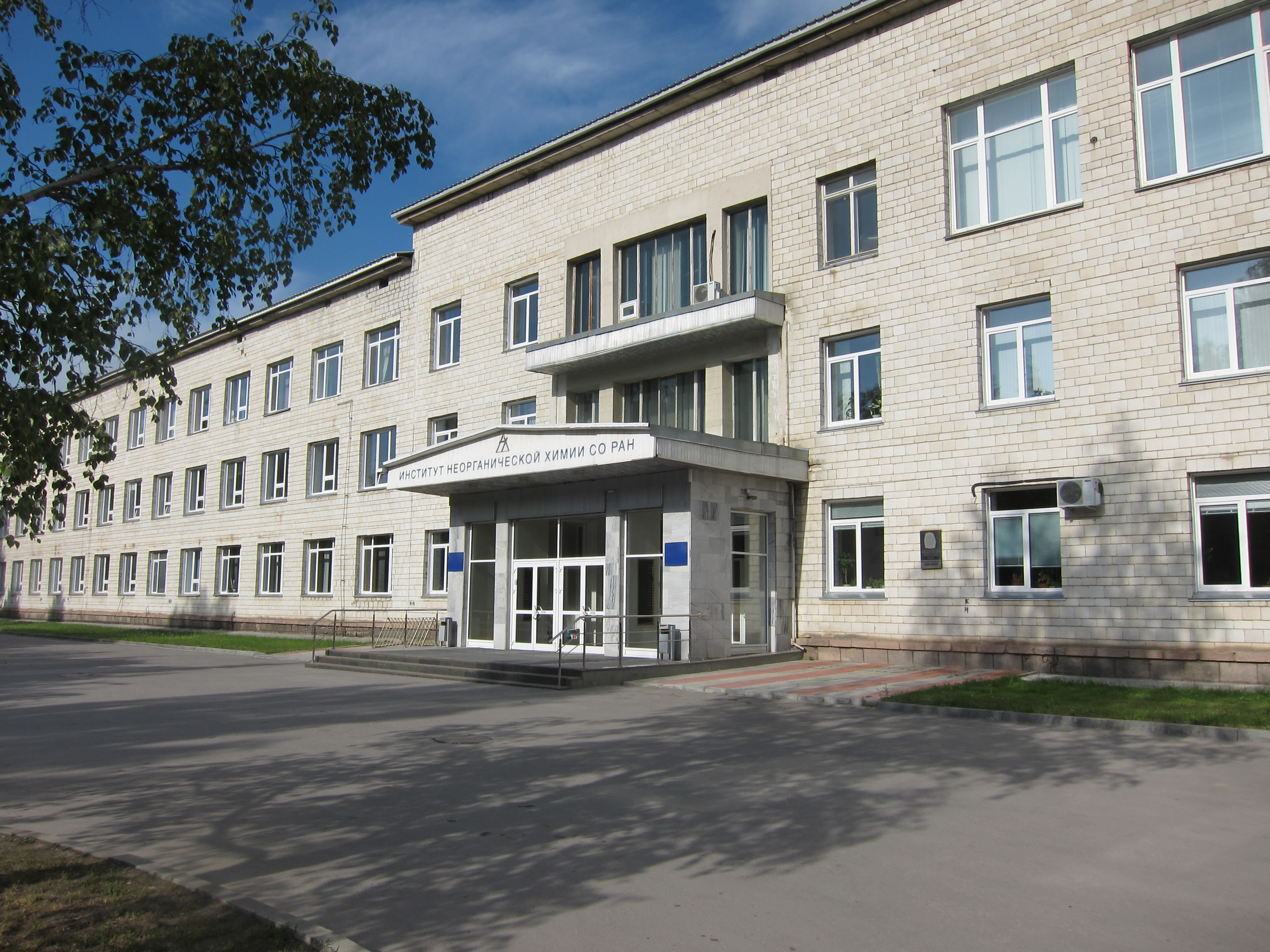
- Established: 1957
- Director: Konstantin Brylev
- Owner: Siberian Branch of RAS
- Address: Lavrentyev Prospekt 3, Novosibirsk, 630090, Russia
- Location: Novosibirsk, Russia
- Website: www.niic.nsc.ru

Nikolaev Institute of Inorganic Chemistry of the Siberian Branch of the RAS (Russian: Институт неорганической химии имени А. В. Николаева СО РАН) is a research institute in Akademgorodok, Novosibirsk, Russia. It was founded in 1957.

== Activities ==
Its field includes the chemistry of inorganic compounds, chemical thermodynamics of inorganic systems, crystal chemistry and electronic structure of inorganic substances.
