= Institute of Solid State Chemistry and Mechanochemistry =

Research institute in Novosibirsk, Russia

- Established: 1944
- Director: Alexander Nemudry
- Owner: Siberian Branch of RAS
- Address: Kutateladze Street 18, Novosibirsk, 630128, Russia
- Location: Novosibirsk, Russia
- Website: www.solid.nsc.ru

The Institute of Solid State Chemistry and Mechanochemistry of the Siberian Branch of the RAS (Russian: Институт химии твердого тела и механохимии СО РАН) is a research institute in Novosibirsk, Russia. It was founded in 1944.

== History ==
The Institute of Solid State Chemistry and Mechanochemistry is one of the oldest scientific institutes in Siberia. It was founded in 1944 as the Chemical and Metallurgical Institute. Five years later, thanks to the institute, a ceramic pipe plant was launched in Dorogino. Later, the institute became part of the Siberian Branch of the USSR Academy of Sciences.

In 1964, the scientific organization was renamed the Institute of Physicochemical Principles of Mineral Raw Materials Processing, and in 1980, it was renamed the Institute of Solid State Chemistry and Mineral Raw Materials Processing. In 1997, the institute was renamed the Institute of Solid State Chemistry and Mechanochemistry.

== Locations ==
The institute is located in Tsentralny District (Frunze Street 13) and Akademgorodok.

== Branches ==
- Kemerovo Division of Institute of Solid State Chemistry and Mechanochemistry of the Siberian Branch of the RAS
