= Silicon Taiga =

Coordinates: 54.852°N 83.105°E

Silicon Taiga is a nickname for Akademgorodok, a Russian research and development center that is located near Novosibirsk. The nickname is a reference to the Silicon Valley, a renowned IT region found in Northern California. The term was first introduced to the Western press by Newsweek magazine in 1999.

== Location ==
The town is situated partly on the River Ob, and partly on the shore of a Novosibirsk artificial reservoir that was created by a dam on the river. Informally, this reservoir is called the Ob Sea. The dam contains a large hydroelectric power plant that was constructed in the 1950s.

The town itself has no skyscrapers, and only one remote speedway connecting it to the city of Novosibirsk. Office buildings and residences are connected by many intertwined, well-worn paths.

== History ==
In the 1950s the former Academy of Sciences of the USSR founded its Siberian Division, today known as the Siberian Division of the Russian Academy of Sciences, with a center of scientific research in Akademgorodok, where it established a dozen research institutes. To keep institutes supplied with fresh minds, Novosibirsk State University (NSU) was founded by a resolution of the Council of Ministers of the USSR on January 9, 1958.

=== Distinctive ===
The distinctive feature of NSU is its system of competitive selection and its training of talented youth. NSU is the only university in Siberia to have developed a multilevel model of continuing education. The university was built and developed simultaneously with the Novosibirsk scientific center and is focused on training highly qualified specialists for scientific work and tutoring. Since its foundation in 1958, more than 50,000 specialists have graduated from Novosibirsk State University; more than 6,000 have defended their PhD dissertations, and over 1,500 have received doctoral degrees. In 2009, NSU achieved the status of a national research university. This high honor was granted by the Russian Government on a competitive basis for a period of ten years.

=== Information Technology Outsourcing ===
The first IT companies were established in Akademgorodok in the 1990s. After the collapse of the Soviet Union, the government's investments in scientific activity were greatly reduced, and many scientists left long established institutions on a quest for better conditions. Some of these scientists decided to leave Russia in search of jobs in foreign scientific organizations all over the world. Others established their own private businesses, which were software-related high-tech IT companies. Many of these companies grew up into large, internationally recommended providers of software products and services. Their strategy was simple: the new IT companies would adopt the tried and true principles of the already established, famous IT corporations.

All IT companies in the Silicon Taiga can be divided into two categories according to the offshore programming business model they employ: The firms that provide Offshore Development Center (ODC), and mostly develop new custom products (NPD), and the firms that are oriented to the SAAS model. Meantime the global giants in the field of software and high-tech products, such as IBM, Intel Corporation, and Schlumberger, saw this growing trend and established branch offices in the Silicon Taiga.

=== Technology park ===
In 2010, a technology park was launched in Akademgorodok.

== Companies and subsidiaries ==
The following is a partial list of past and present notable companies founded in the Silicon Taiga or which have a major subsidiary located there:

- Alawar Entertainment
- Arello Mobile
- ATAPY Software
- Axmor
- Azoft
- Baker Hughes
- BCS-IT
- Fortess
- HP (By establishing HP's International Institute of Technology in Novosibirsk State University)
- Intel Corporation
- Novosoft
- Parallels
- Schlumberger
- Sibers
- Velvetech
- Vito technology
