= Institute of Economics and Industrial Engineering =

Russian research institute

- Established: 1958
- Address: Lavrentyev Prospekt, 17, Novosibirsk, 630090, Russia
- Location: Novosibirsk, Russia
- Website: www.ieie.su

Institute of Economics and Industrial Engineering of the Siberian Branch of the RAS (Russian: Институт экономики и организации промышленного производства СО РАН) is a scientific organization in Sovetsky District of Novosibirsk, Russia. It was founded in 1958.

== History ==
In 1957, the Institute of Economics and Statistics established. In 1958, it was renamed the Institute of Economics and Industrial Engineering. The founder of the organization was G. A. Prudensky.

In early 2002, the institute employed 329 people, including 3 members of the RAS, 27 doctors of sciences, 89 candidates of sciences.
