= Institute of History of Siberian Branch of the Russian Academy of Sciences =

Russian research institute

Institute of History of Siberian Branch of the Russian Academy of Sciences (Russian: Институт истории СО РАН)
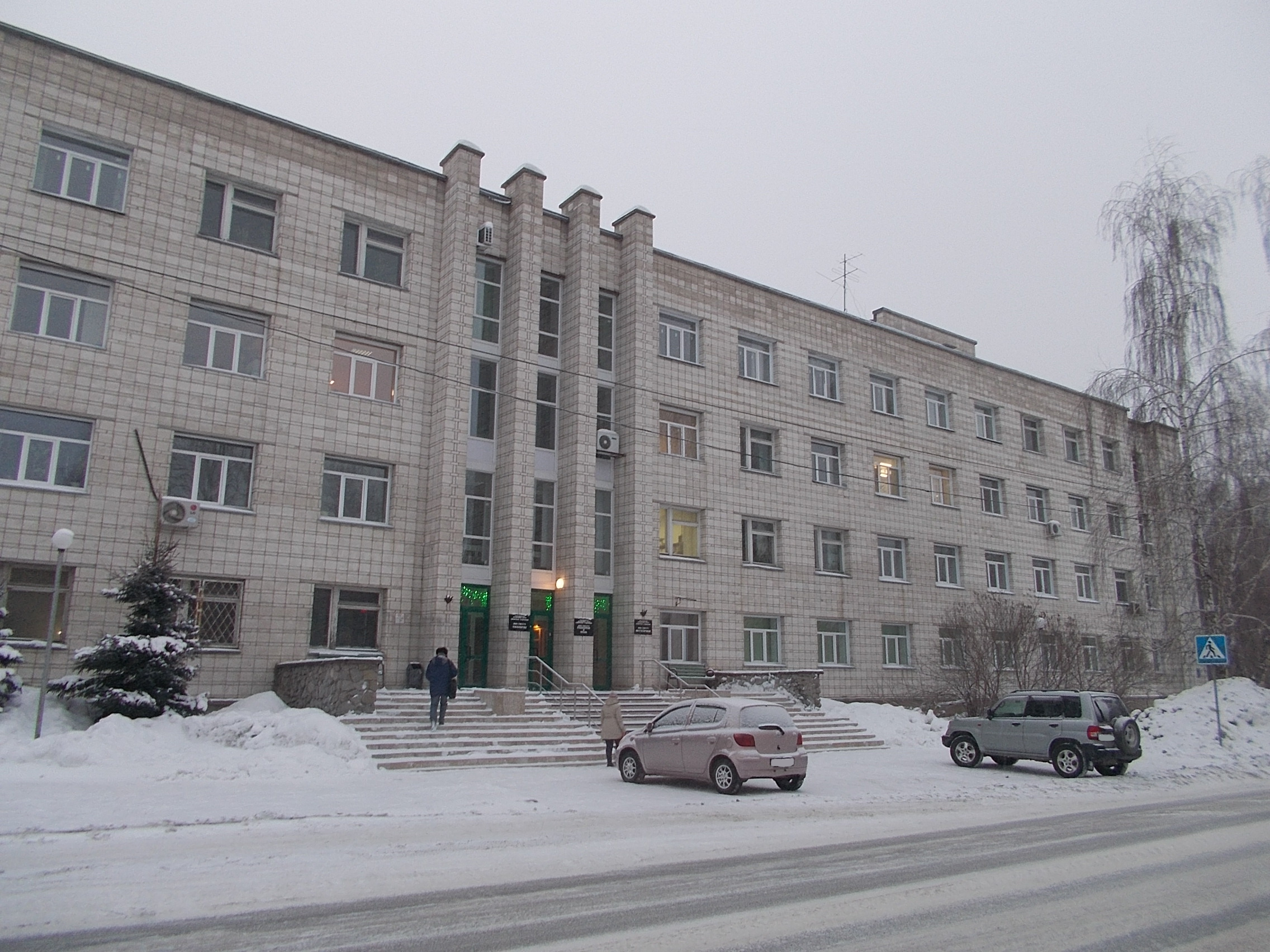
- Founder: Federal Agency of Scientific Institutions
- Established: 2007
- Focus: History of Siberia
- President: Vladimir Lamin
- Address: 630090 Novosibirsk, Nikolaeva Str. 8,
- Location: Novosibirsk, Russia
- Website: Official website

The Institute of History of Siberian Branch of the Russian Academy of Sciences (Russian: Институт истории СО РАН) is a part of the Historical and Philological Studies Department of the Russian Academy of Sciences. Currently, as a result of the dissolution of the Russian Academy of Sciences, the Institute is subordinate to the Federal Agency of Scientific Institutions. It is focused on comprehensive studies of history of Siberia in from the 16th to the 20th centuries.

== History ==
The Institute was founded in 2007 after dissolution of a larger institution, which encompassed the studies of history, languages and philosophy in Siberia.

The Institute was established on the foundation of the Unified Institute of history, philology, and philosophy of the Siberian Branch of the Academy of Sciences of the USSR (IIFiF SO AN SSSR). The Unified Institute was created on December 23, 1966, on the basis of the Humanities Research Department in the Institute of Economics and Industrial Production (IEiOPP), Siberian Branch of the Academy of Sciences. (The Industrial History Section of IEiOPP, established in March 1961, became the Humanities Research Department in July 1962).

== Structure ==
Structure of the Institute

- Directorate
- Administration
- Academic Council
- Dissertation Council D 200.05.01 on defending dissertations for the degree of Doctor of Science
- Scientific Council on Museums of the SB RAS
- Council of the labor collective
- Council of Scientific Youth
- Scientific subdivisions

Sector of archaeography and source study (Archeographic and Source-Study Section)

Sector history of the second half of the 16th – early 20th century.

Sector of the history of socio-political development

Sector for the History of Social and Economic Development

Sector of Agrarian History

Sector for Historical and Demographic Studies

Sector Museum of the Siberian Branch of the RAS

Research group Science and Technology Museum of SB RAS

- Postgraduate study
- Library

== List of prominent employees ==
=== Moved to another institution ===
Member of Russian Academy of Sciences Vyacheslav Molodin.

=== Deceased ===
Member of Russian Academy of Sciences Nikolay N. Pokrovsky.

== Publishing activity ==
The Institute of History publishes many books, articles, an academic journal and encyclopedic editions.

=== Academic journal ===
Humanities in Siberia

Humanities in Siberia (Russian: Гуманитарные науки в Сибири, ISSN 0869-8651) is an academic journal published four times a year since 1959 in Russian language about history of Siberia in the 16th—21st centuries. The journal has its own page on the website of the Institute and an English version of the web-site.

=== Encyclopedic editions ===
In 2009 the Institute has published Historical Encyclopedia of Siberia in three volume. The web version is available

== See also ==
- Siberian Branch of the Russian Academy of Sciences
