= Nikolai Yanenko =

Soviet mathematician and academician

- Born: 22 May 1921
- Died: 16 January 1984 (aged 62)
- Education: Tomsk State University
- Scientific career
- Fields: Mathematics
- Doctoral advisor: Petr Rashevskii

Nikolai Nikolaevich Yanenko (Russian: Николай Николаевич Яненко; 22 May 1921 – 16 January 1984) was a Soviet mathematician and academician. He was known for his contributions to computational mathematics and fluid mechanics. He served as Director of the Institute of Theoretical and Applied Mechanics of the Siberian Division of the USSR Academy of Sciences.

== Education and research ==
After finishing the Tomsk State University at 1942, Yanenko received his Ph.D. degree from Lomonosov Moscow State University in 1954 under the supervision of Petr Rashevskii. The topic of his doctoral thesis was a problem in multidimensional differential geometry. His scientific interests span several areas of fundamental research, including gas dynamics, the theory of difference schemes, and computational fluid dynamics.

In recognition of Yanenko's scientific contributions the International Conference on "Mathematical Models and Numerical Methods of Continuum Mechanics" was held on May 26, 1996 at the Novosibirsk Scientific Center, Novosibirsk.
