= Akademgorodok =

Academic campus in Sovetsky District of the city of Novosibirsk

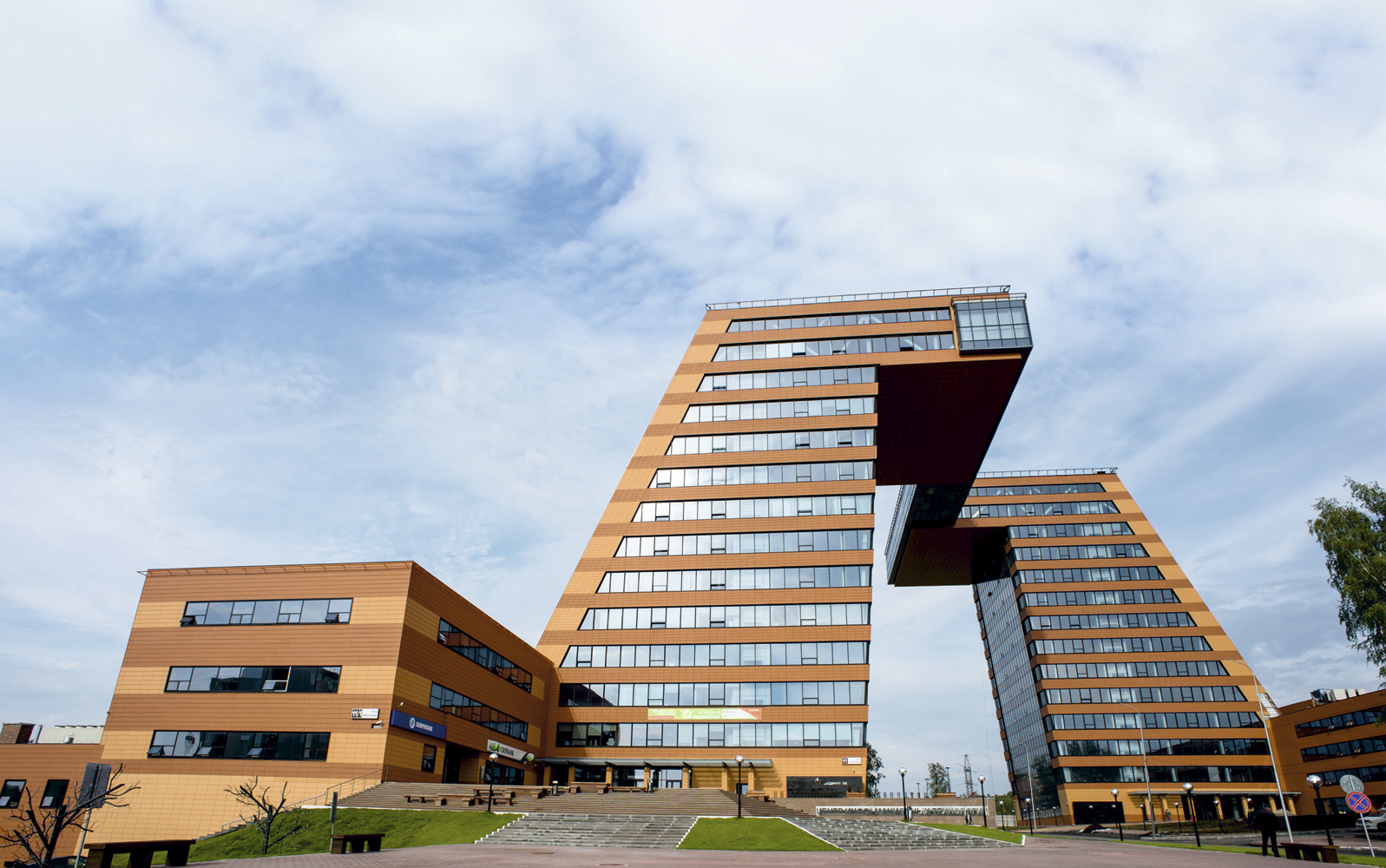
"The Geese", Academpark Technopark

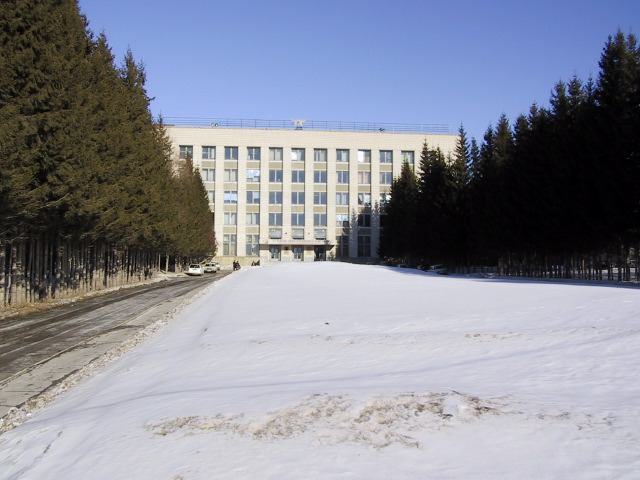
The Budker Institute of Nuclear Physics

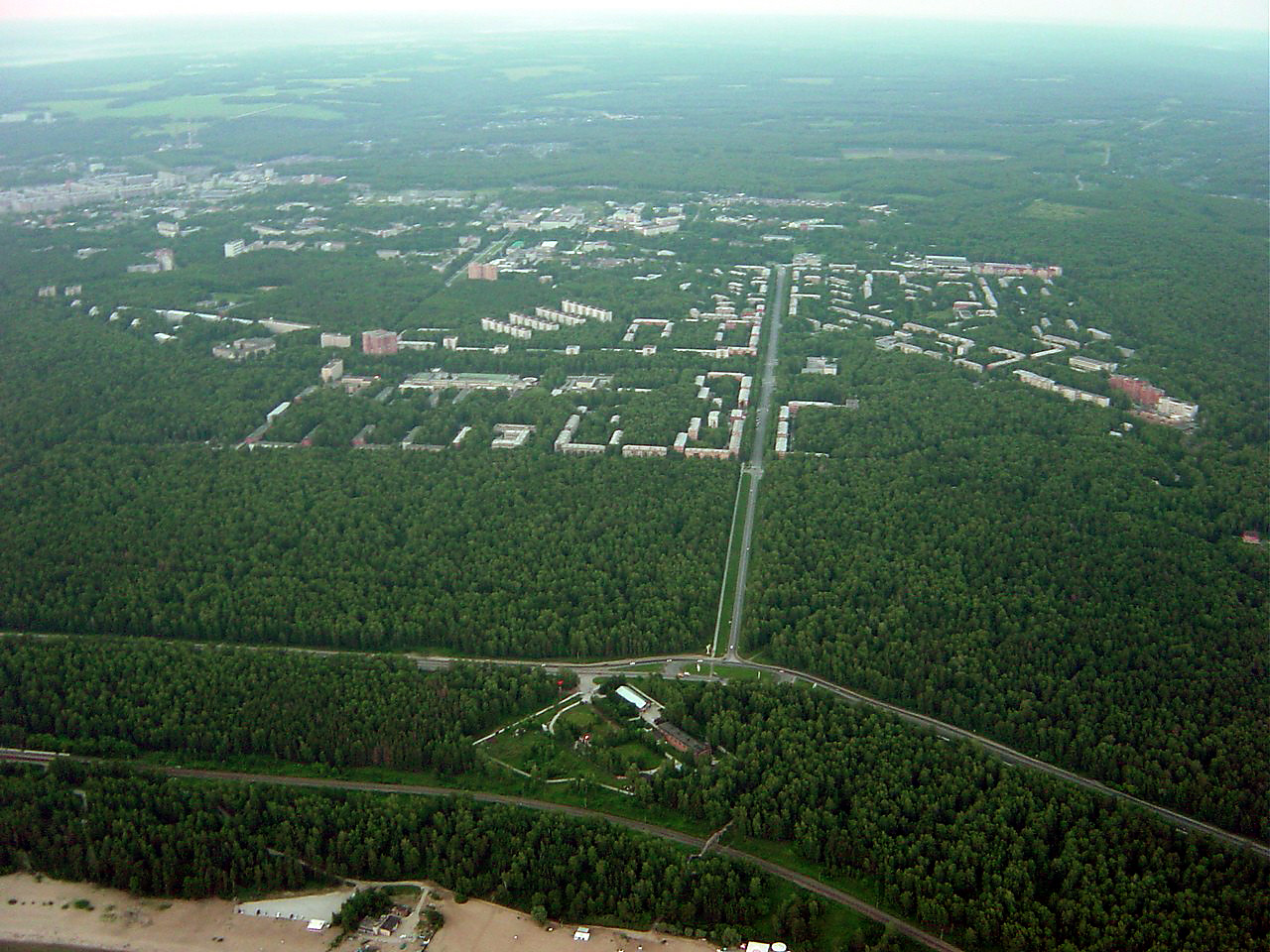
Aerial view of Akademgorodok

Akademgorodok (Russian: Академгородок, IPA: [ɐkəˌdʲemɡərɐˈdok], "Academic Town") is a part of the Sovetsky District of the city of Novosibirsk, Russia, located 30 km (19 mi) south of the city center and about 10 km (6.2 mi) west of Koltsovo. It is the educational and scientific centre of Siberia.

It is surrounded by a birch and pine forest on the shore of the Ob Sea, an artificial reservoir on the river Ob. Formally it is a part of Novosibirsk city, and has never been a closed city.

Located within Akademgorodok is Novosibirsk State University, 35 research institutes, a medical academy, apartment buildings and houses, and a variety of community amenities including stores, hotels, hospitals, restaurants and cafes, cinemas, clubs and libraries. The House of Scientists (Дом учёных, Dom Uchyonykh), a social center of Akademgorodok, hosts a library containing 100 thousand volumes – Russian classics, modern literature and also many American, British, French, German, Polish books and magazines. The House of Scientists also includes a picture gallery, lecture halls and a concert hall.

== History ==
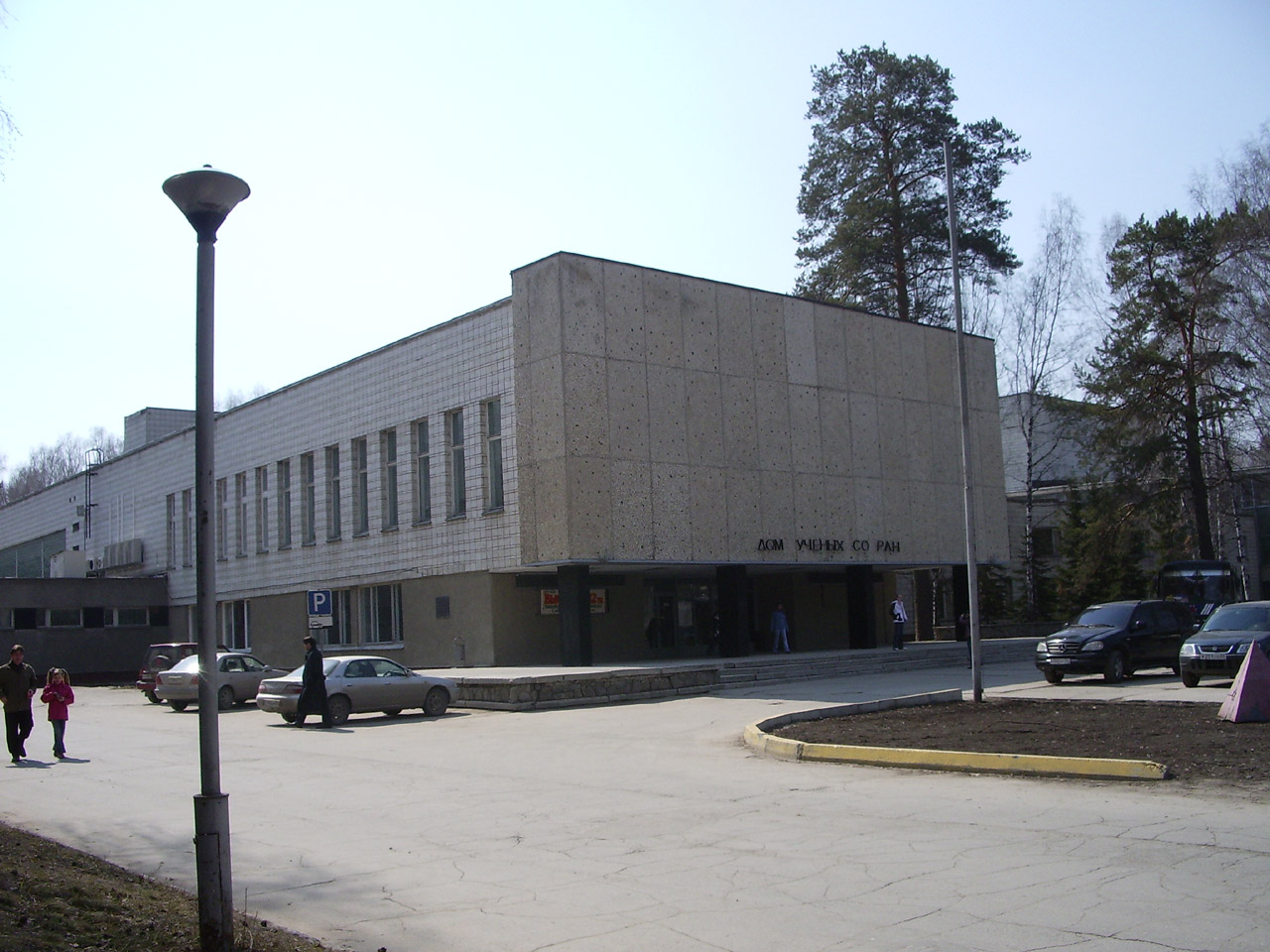
The House of Scientists is the cultural centre of Akademgorodok

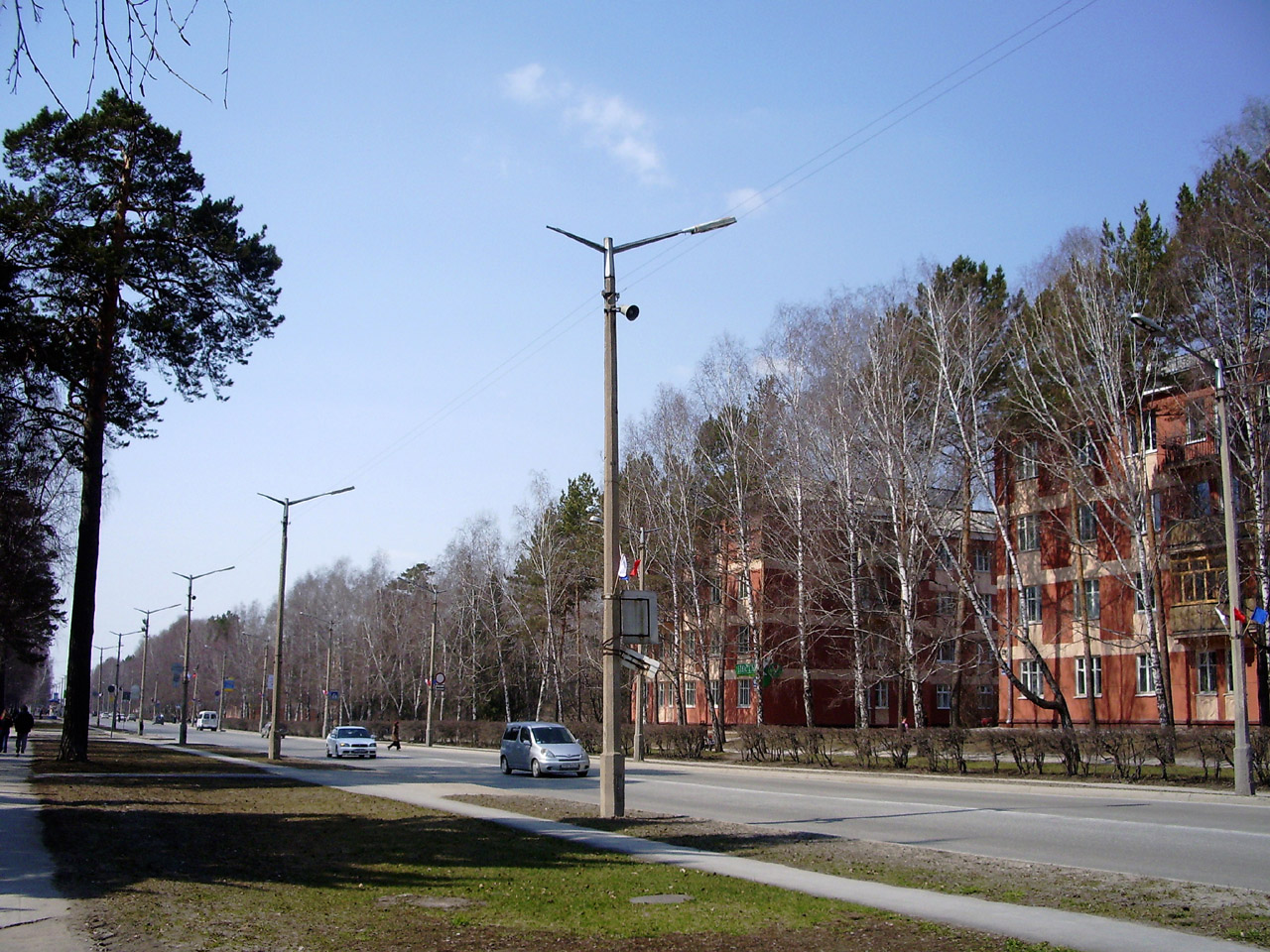
Residential houses at Morskoy Avenue

The town was founded in 1957 under the auspices of the Academy of Sciences of the USSR. Academician Mikhail Alexeyevich Lavrentyev, a mechanician and mathematician, the first Chairman of the Siberian Branch of the Soviet Academy of Sciences, played a prominent role in establishing Akademgorodok. At its peak, Akademgorodok was home to 65,000 scientists and their families, and was a privileged area to live in.

During the Soviet period (1961–1991), due to the peculiarity of the Soviet economic system, monetary rewards did not always translate into a higher standard of living. To offset this, a special compensation system was devised in Akademgorodok for its residents and leading scientists. For example, residents of Akademgorodok had access to special food ration distribution outlets (stoly zakazov) that provided, most of the time, an access to some basic subsidized foodstuffs, which were not always easily obtainable elsewhere. Scientists who had obtained a doctorate (a post-Ph.D. degree under the Russian system) were rewarded by the authorities with the special food delivery service (doktorskiy zakaz), which provided access to a wider selection of groceries than available to the general population; some of the scientists, despite being eligible, refused it on moral grounds.

Full and corresponding members of the Academy of Sciences had access to still higher level of service (akademicheskiy zakaz) and were eligible to live in single-family residences (called "cottages"), considered luxurious by Soviet standards, as most of the population lived in apartments in nine- and four-story multi-apartment buildings.

During the early years residents enjoyed great freedom from the rules and restraints of the Soviet Union, with a modernist cultural centre exhibiting works by banned Soviet artists, risqué poetry evenings, and other activities allowed nowhere else. Scientific research in areas dismissed as dangerous pseudoscience in Moscow, such as cybernetics and genetics, flourished. However, freedoms were severely curtailed in the 1970s during the Brezhnev era.

== Akademgorodok in the post-Soviet era ==
The collapse of the Soviet Union saw many scientists, including whole cadres of Russia's top minds in the physical and theoretical sciences, reduced to penury. Beginning in the mid-1990s, as economic reforms allowed private investment in Russia, Akademgorodok saw the beginnings of venture funding. In 1992, a software company called Novosoft was founded here, and its chief client was IBM. Around this time CFT started, which specializes in banking and financial software. By 1997, private investment reached US$10 million; by 2006, it was $150 million, reaching about $1 billion by 2015.

Intel and Schlumberger have brought work to Akademgorodok, and other companies are following them into the area. Many scientists, including Lavrentyev's son, also named Mikhail and an accomplished mathematician in his own right, were heavily involved in this renaissance. Currently its population stands at over 100,000 and there are over 40 research institutes located within Akademgorodok.

As of 2015, 300 companies had been set up since 2011, employing about 9,000 people and generating 17bn roubles (£175M) annually.

The area is sometimes called "Silicon Forest" or "Silicon Taiga". A much larger technology center in the former Soviet Union is the Skolkovo Innovation Center, conveniently located on the outskirts of Moscow, a $4bn state project with annual revenues of $1bn.

== List of research and education facilities in Akademgorodok ==
- Kutateladze Institute of Thermal Physics
- Nikolaev Institute of Inorganic Chemistry
- Boreskov Institute of Catalysis
- Budker Institute of Nuclear Physics
- Ershov Institute of Informatics Systems
- Institute of Informatics and Mathematical Geophysics
- Institute of Chemical Biology and Fundamental Medicine
- Institute of Cytology and Genetics
- Institute of Molecular and Cellular Biology
- Sobolev Institute of Mathematics
- United Institute of Geology, Geophysics and Mineralogy
- Institute of Automation and Electrometry
- Institute of Semiconductors Physics
- Khristianovich Institute of Theoretical and Applied Mechanics Archived 2019-11-18 at the Wayback Machine
- Institute of Chemical Kinetics and Combustion
- Lavrentyev Institute of Hydrodynamics
- Institute of History of Siberian Branch of the Russian Academy of Sciences
- Institute of Philology
- Institute of Philosophy and Law
- Institute of Laser Physics
- Central Siberian Botanical Garden
- Central Siberian Botanical Garden
- Institute of Solid State Chemistry and Mechanochemistry
- Research Institute of Circulation Pathology
- Institute of Economics and Industrial Engineering
- Presidium of the Siberian Division of the Russian Academy of Sciences
- House of Scientists
- Novosibirsk State University
- Specialized Educational Scientific Center on Physics, Mathematics, Chemistry and Biology of Novosibirsk State University
- Museum of Archæology and Ethnography
- Central Siberian Geological Museum
- Institute of Computational Technologies

The QSI International School of Novosibirsk, previously located in Akademgorodok, opened in 2008.

== Sightseeing ==
The Technopark (Academpark) has a distinctive headquarters, constructed in 2013. It has two inclined towers connected by an overhead passage on the 13-14th floor level. Its unique form is the source of its nickname, "the geese".

== See also ==
- Education in Russia
- "Silicon Taiga"
