= Sovetsky District, Novosibirsk =

Sovetsky District
- District
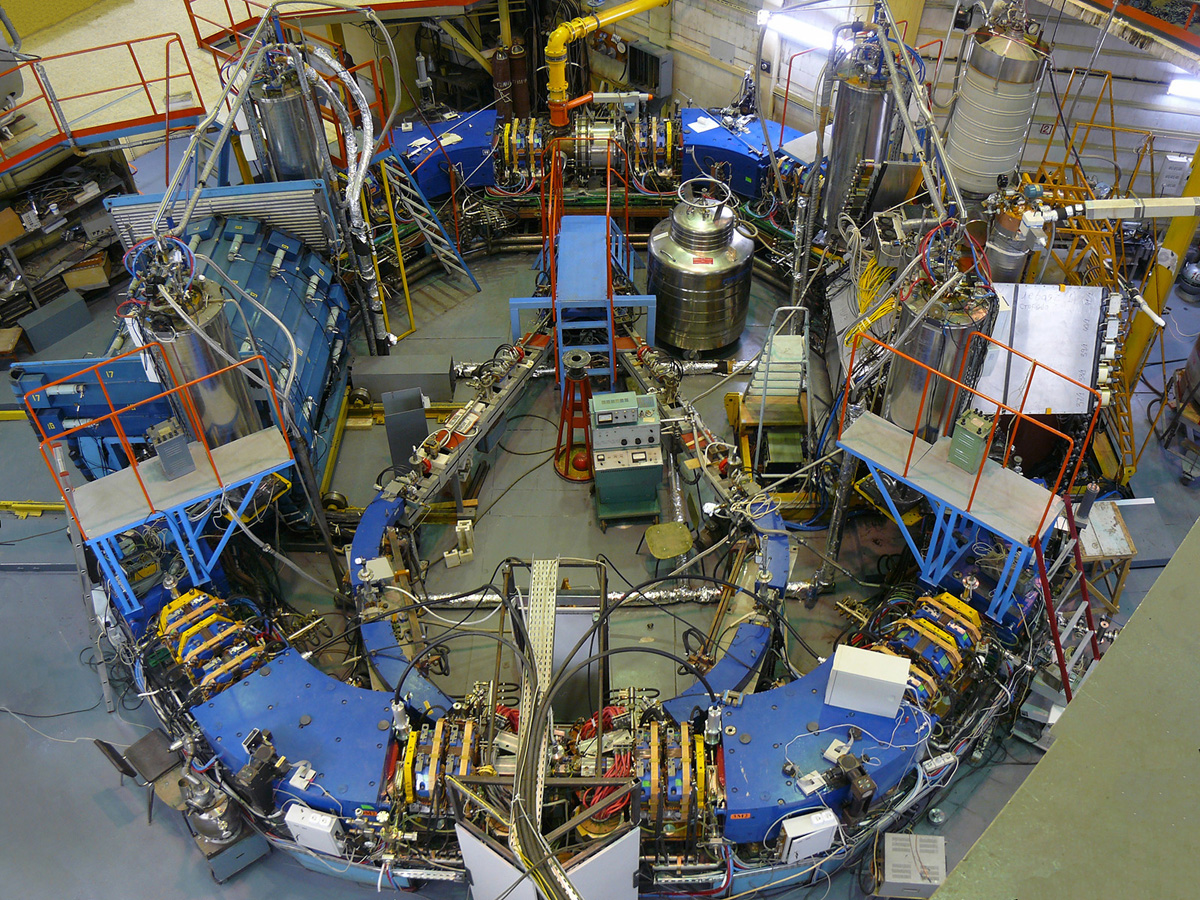
- VEPP-2000 is an electron-positron collider at Budker Institute of Nuclear Physics
- Location of Sovetsky City District
- Coordinates: 54°55′00″N 83°00′00″E
- Country: Russia
- Federal subject: Novosibirsk
- Established: 26 March 1958

Area
  - Total: 89.2 km^{2} (34.4 sq mi)

Sovetsky District is an administrative district (raion), one of the 10 raions of Novosibirsk, Russia. It is located on the right and left banks of the Ob River. The area of the district is 89,2 km^{2} (34,4 sq mi). Population: 141,911 (2018 Census).

== History ==
The district was established on March 26, 1958. The new raion included Ogurtsovo, Left Chyomy and Right Chyomy, Nizhnyaya Yeltsovka, "Shcha" Microdistrict and Akademgorodok.

In 1959 more than 33,000 people lived in the Sovetsky District.

== Akademgorodok ==
Akademgorodok was founded in 1957. Academicians Mikhail Lavrentyev, Sergey Sobolev, Andrey Trofimuk, Sergey Khristianovich and others played a big role in establishing of the naukograd. The Institute of Hydrodynamics is one of the first research institutions that opened in the scientific town.

December 30, 2014 Akademgorodok was included in The Register of Objects of Cultural Heritage (monuments of history and culture) of the Peoples of the Russian Federation

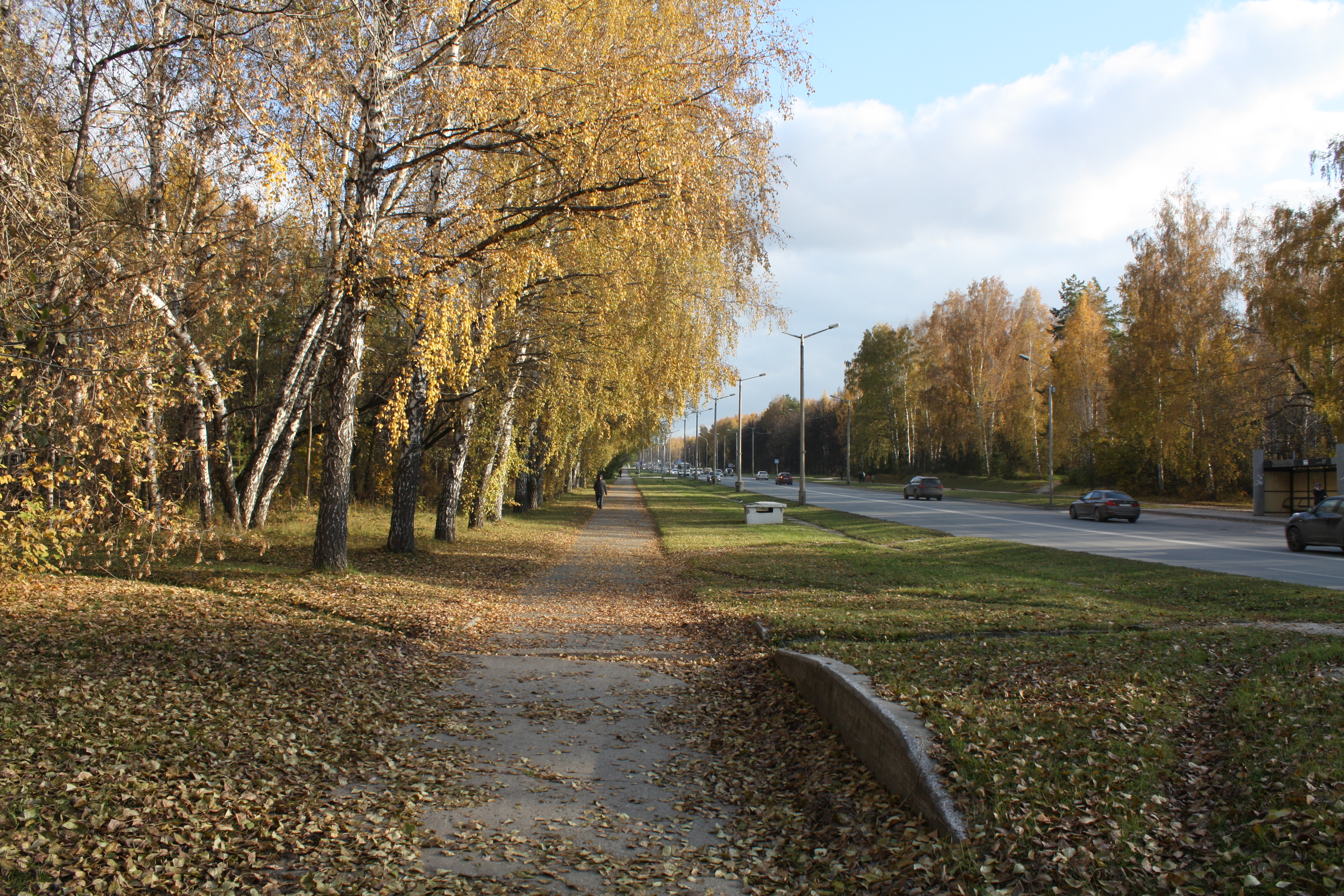
Academician Lavrentyev Avenue

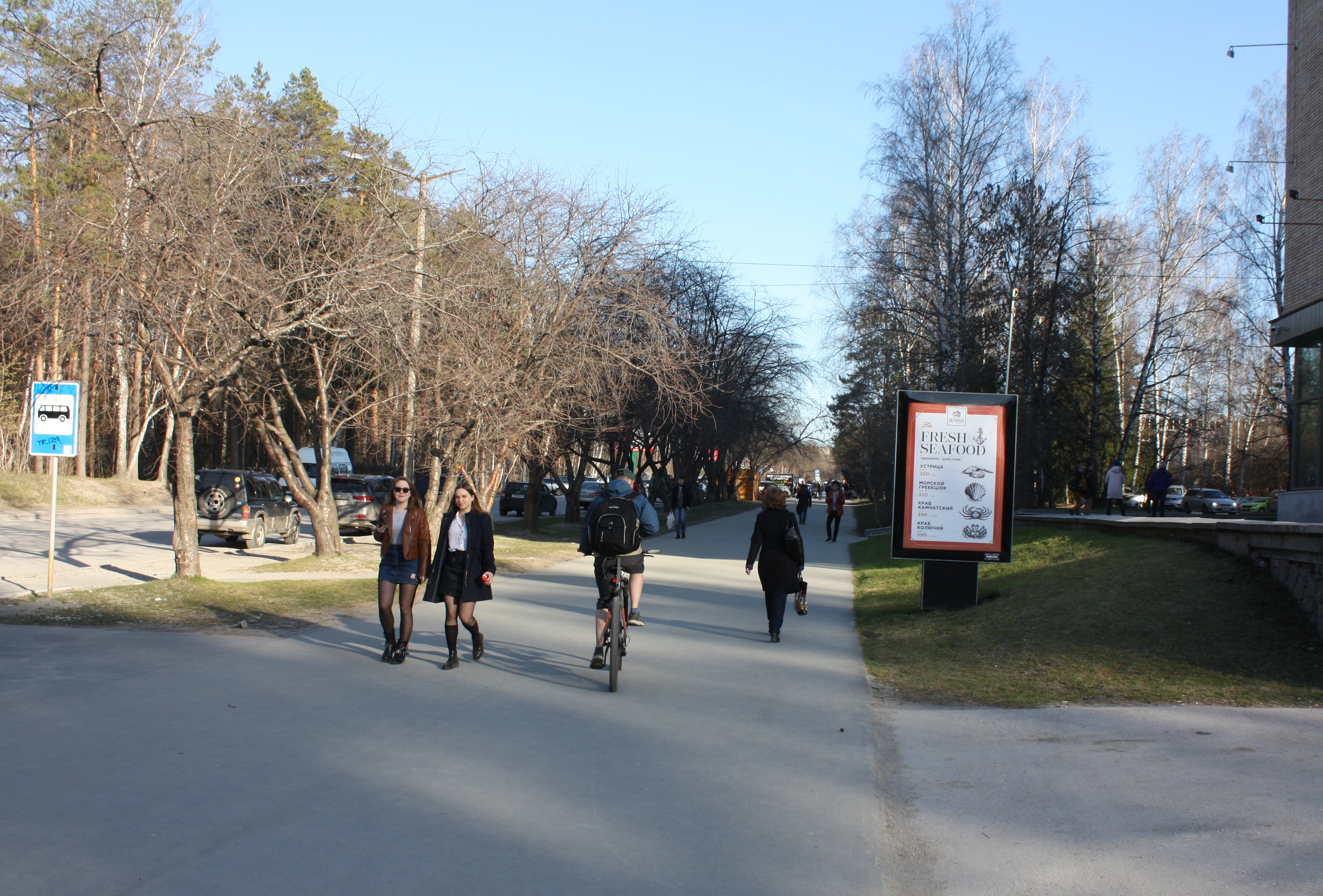
Ilyich Street

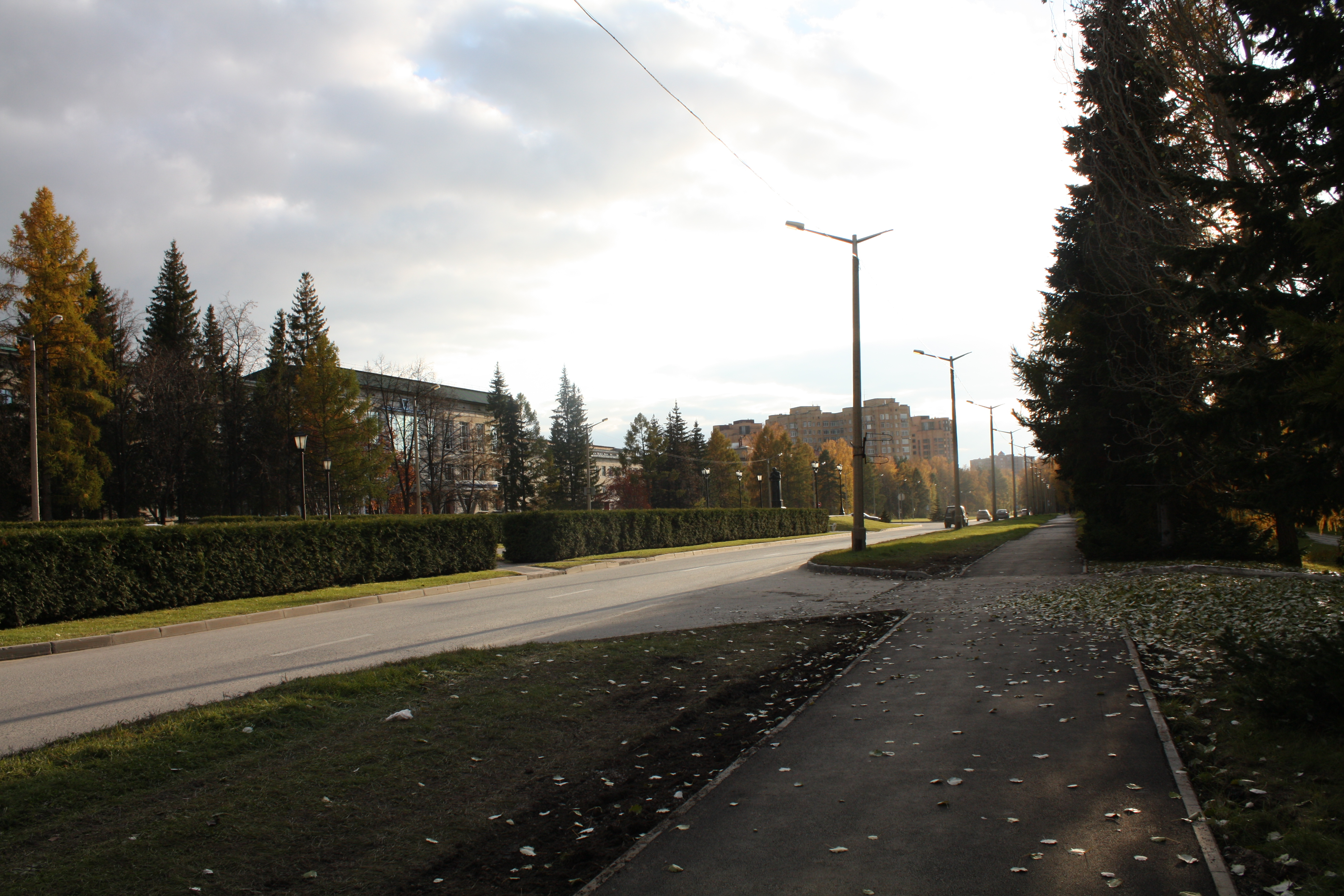
Academician Koptyug Avenue

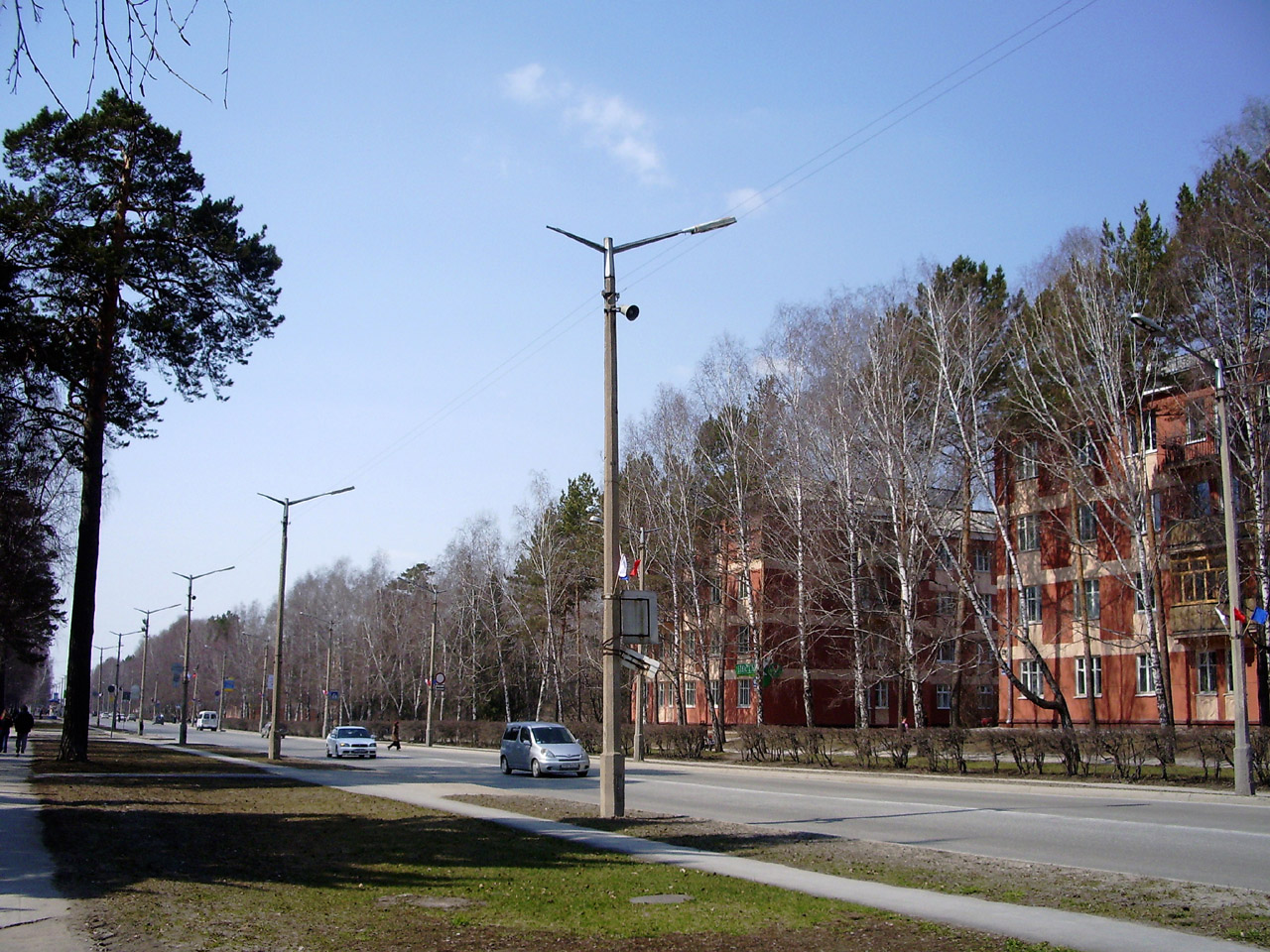
Morskoy Prospekt

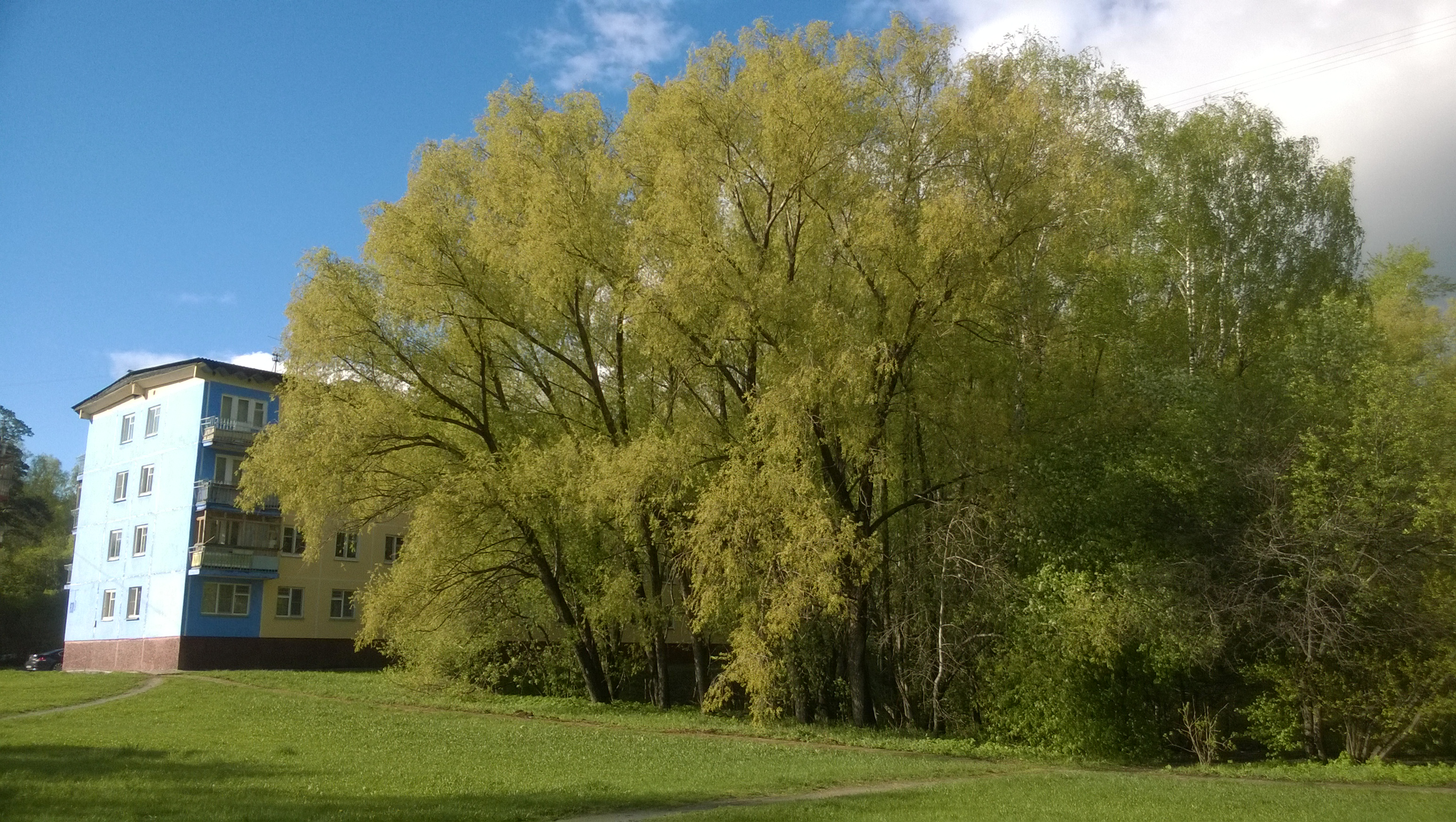
Tsvetnoy Proyezd

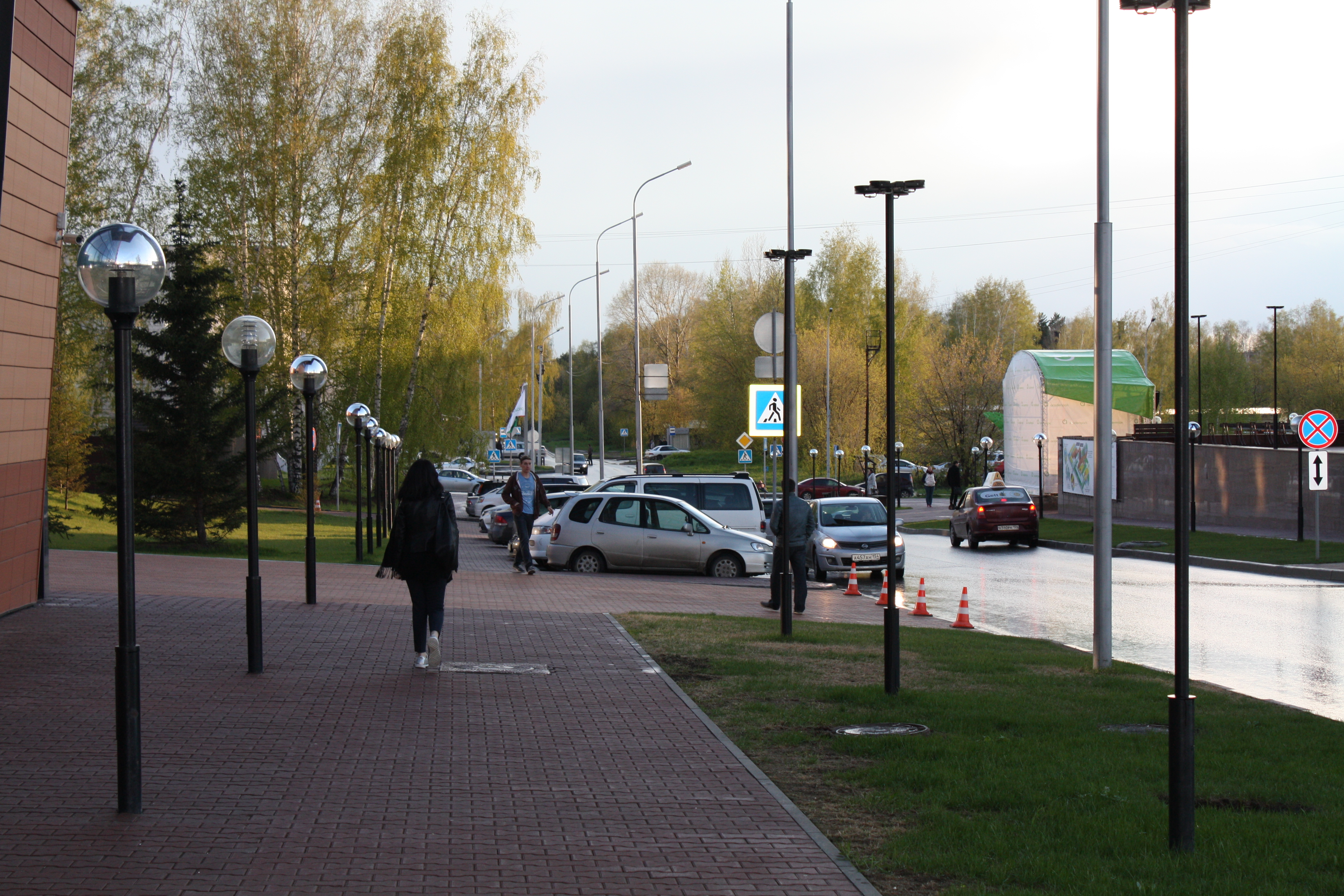
Nikolaev Street

== Nizhnyaya Yeltsovka ==
The village has been known since the beginning of the 18th century.

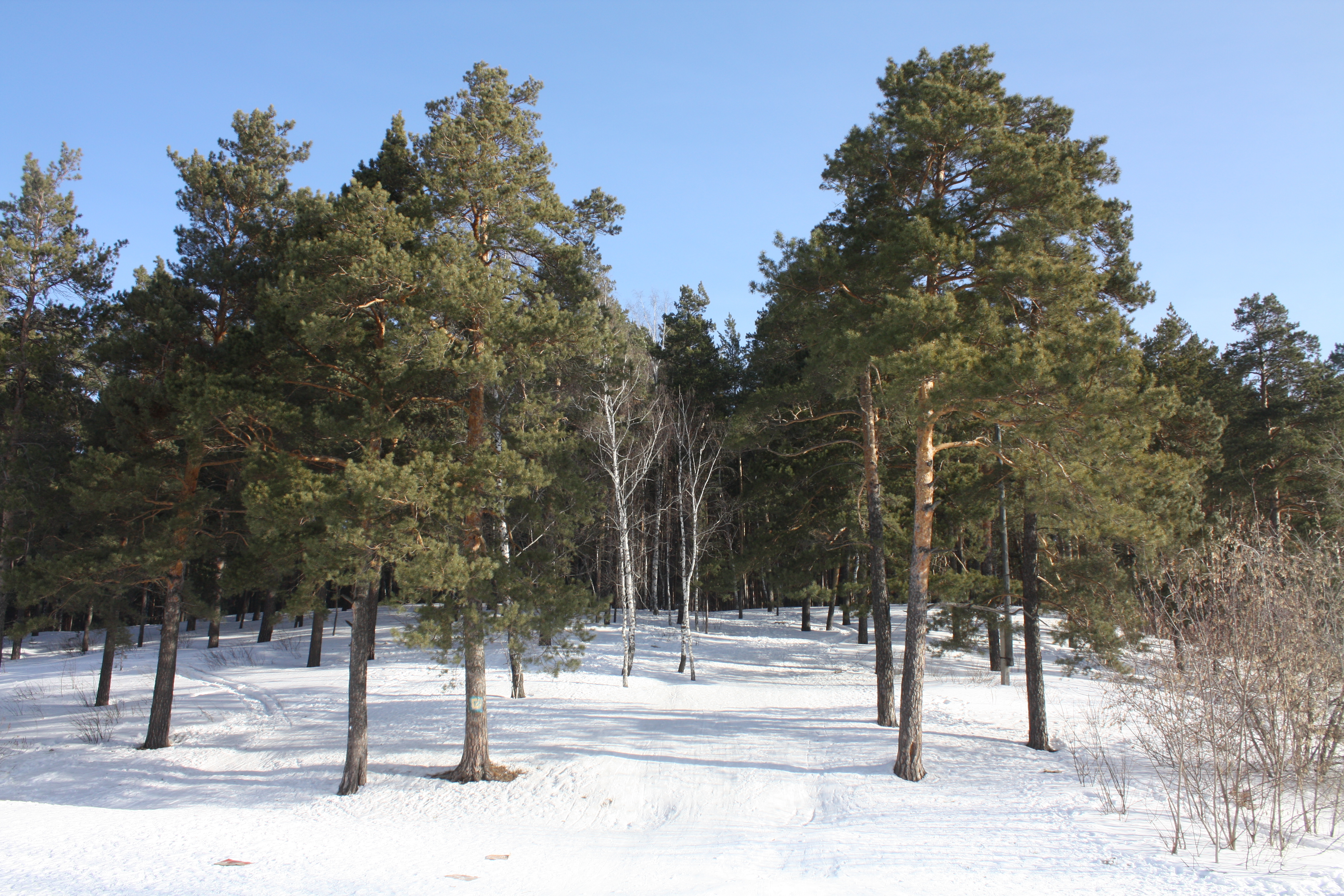

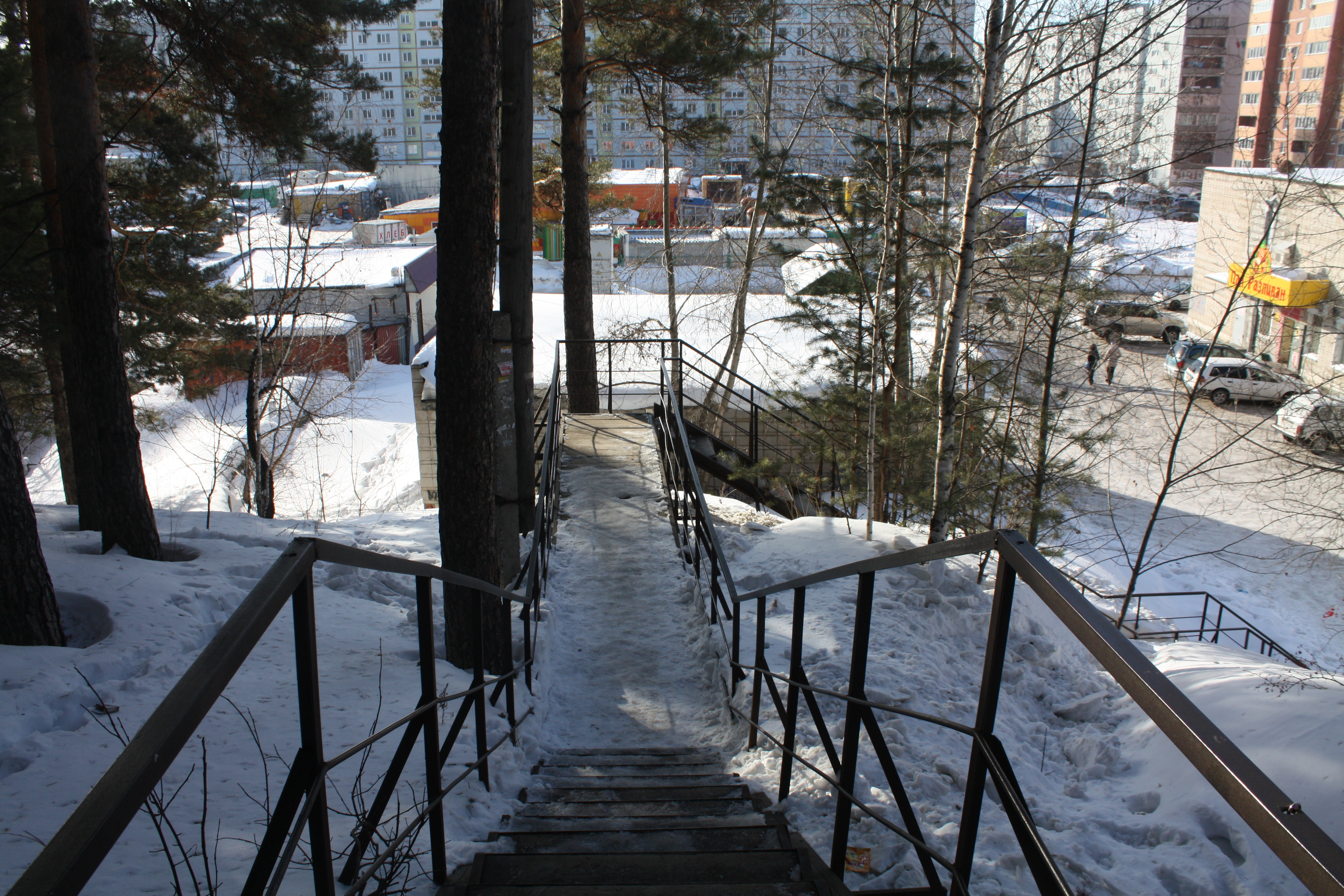

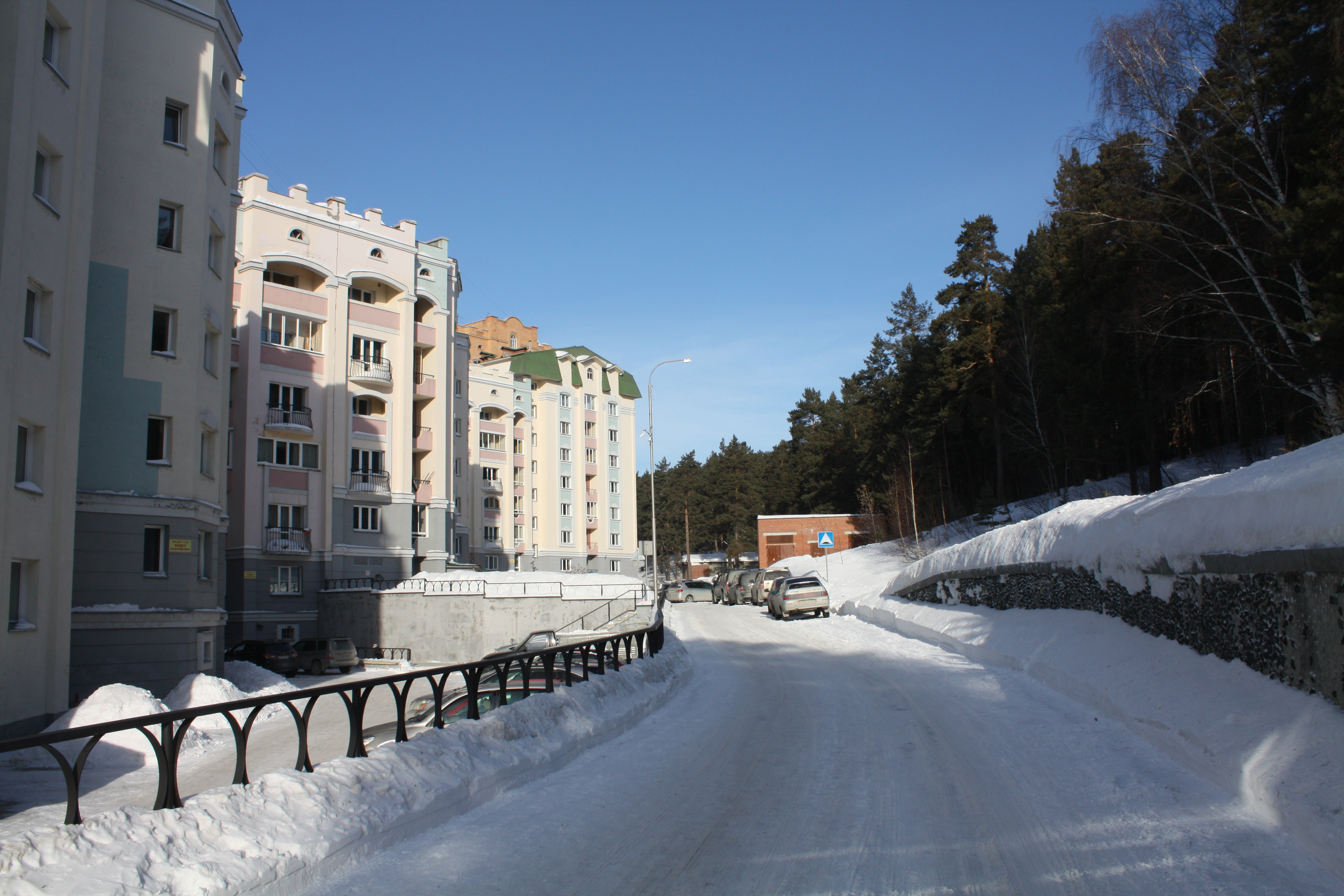

== ObGES Microdistrict ==
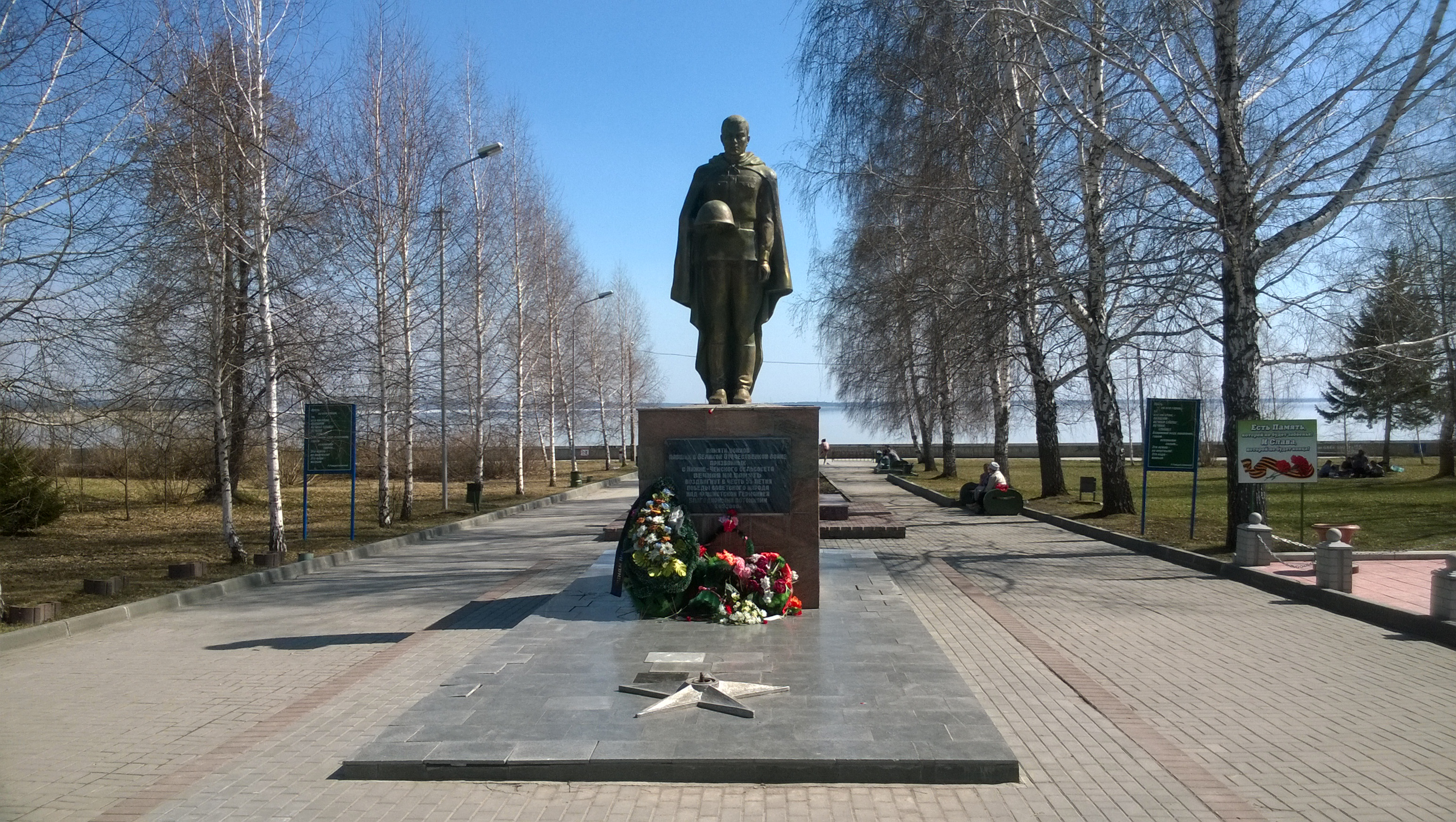

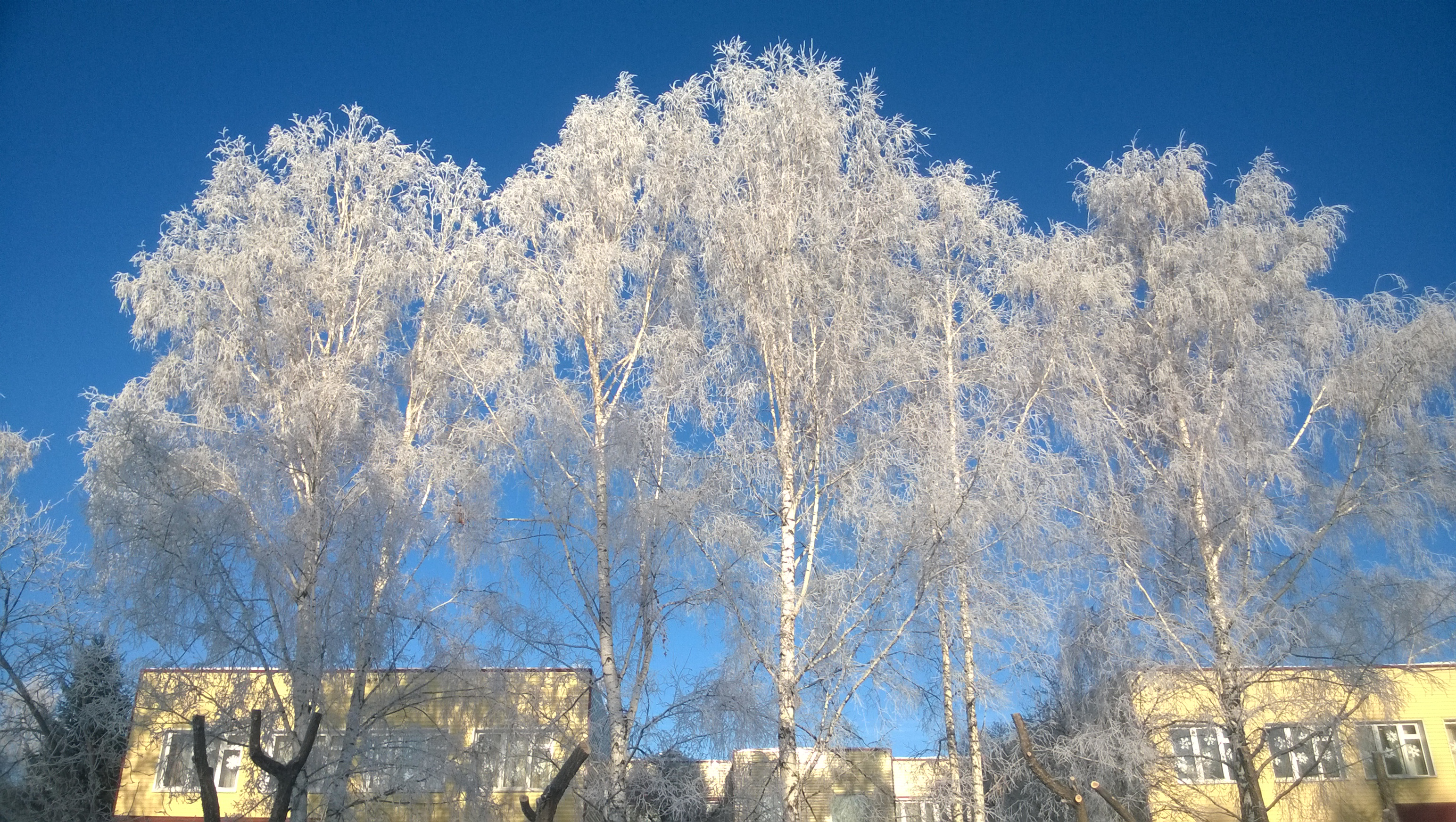

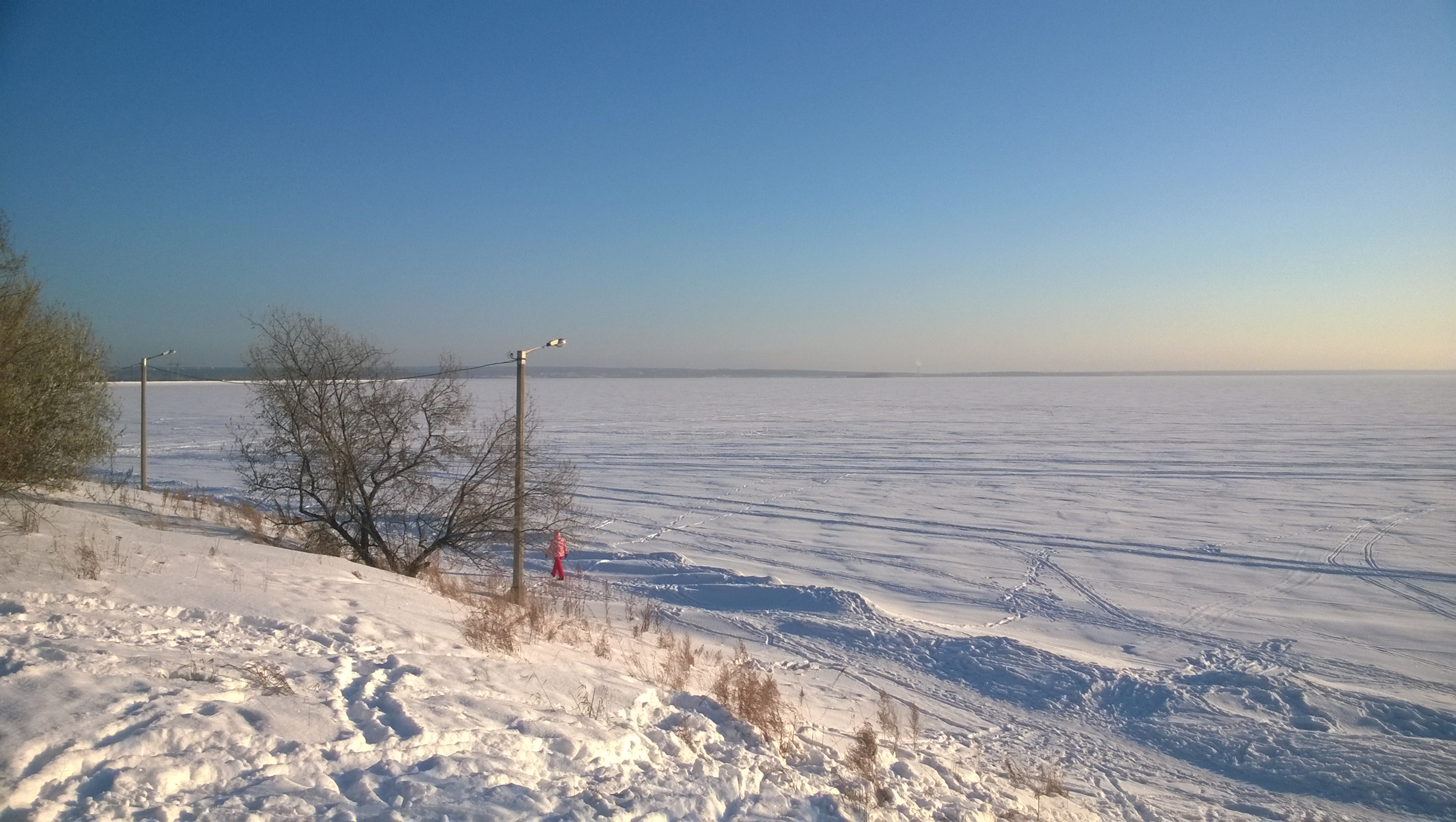
Novosibirsk Reservoir

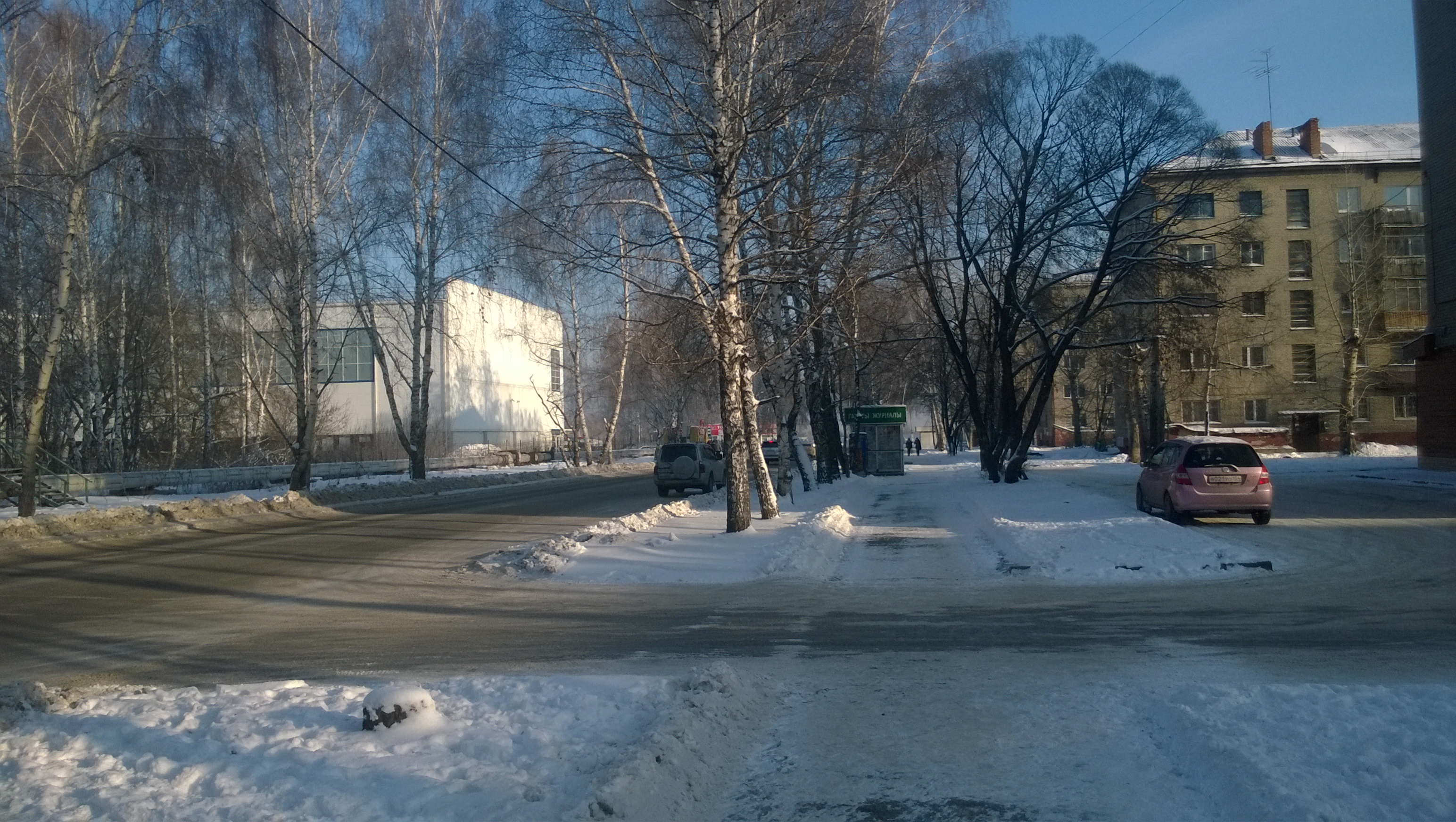
Chasovaya Street

== Shlyuz Microdistrict ==
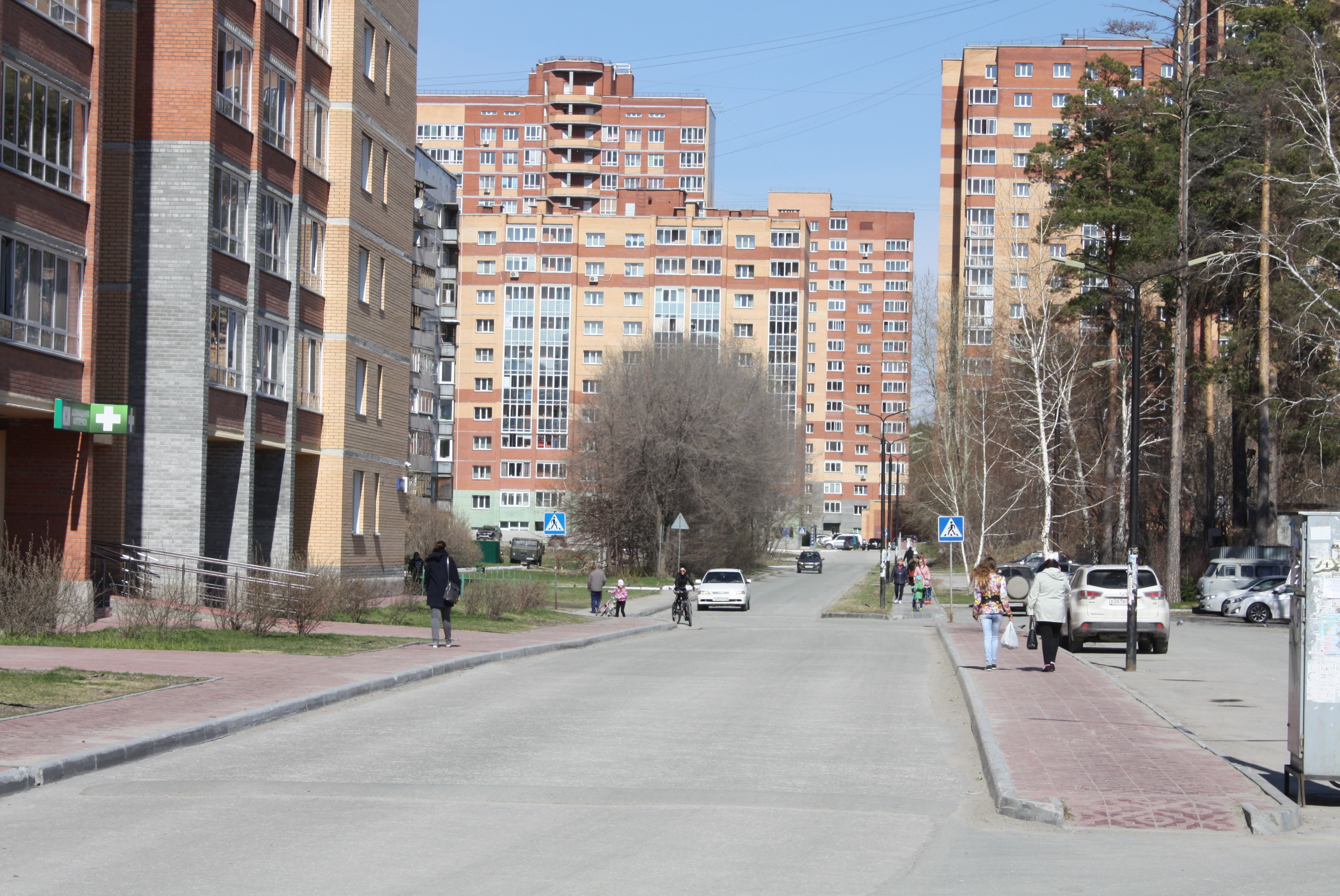
Sirenevaya Street

== Science ==
=== Scientific organizations in Akademgorodok ===
- Kutateladze Institute of Thermophysics
- Nikolaev Institute of Inorganic Chemistry
- Boreskov Institute of Catalysis
- Vorozhtsov Institute of Organic chemistry
- Budker Institute of Nuclear Physics
- Ershov Institute of Informatics Systems
- Institute of Informatics and Mathematical Geophysics
- Institute of Chemical Biology and Fundamental Medicine
- Institute of Cytology and Genetics
- Institute of Molecular and Cellular Biology
- Sobolev Institute of Mathematics
- United Institute of Geology, Geophysics and Mineralogy
- Institute of Automation and Electrometry
- Institute of Semiconductors Physics
- Khristianovich Institute of Theoretical and Applied Mechanics
- Voevodsky Institute of Chemical Kinetics and Combustion
- Lavrentyev Institute of Hydrodynamics
- Institute of History of Siberian Branch of the Russian Academy of Sciences
- Institute of Philology
- Institute of Philosophy and Law
- Institute of Laser Physics
- Institute of Solid State Chemistry and Mechanochemistry
- Research Institute of Circulation Pathology
- Institute of Economics and Industrial Engineering
- Trofimuk Institute of Petroleum Geology and Geophysics
- Presidium of the Siberian Division of the Russian Academy of Sciences
- Central Siberian Botanical Garden
- Institute of Computational Technologies

=== Scientific organizations in Nizhnyaya Yeltsovka ===
- Research Institute of Experimental and Clinical Medicine
- Research Institute of Molecular Biology and Biophysics
- Research Institute of Physiology and Fundamental Medicine
- Department of the Institute of Mining of the SB RAS

=== Scientific organizations in Shlyuz Microdistrict ===
- Research Institute of Automated Planning and Control Systems
- Department of Trofimuk Institute of Petroleum Geology and Geophysics

== Education ==
=== Novosibirsk State University ===
Novosibirsk State University is located in the Akademgorodok. It was established in 1959.

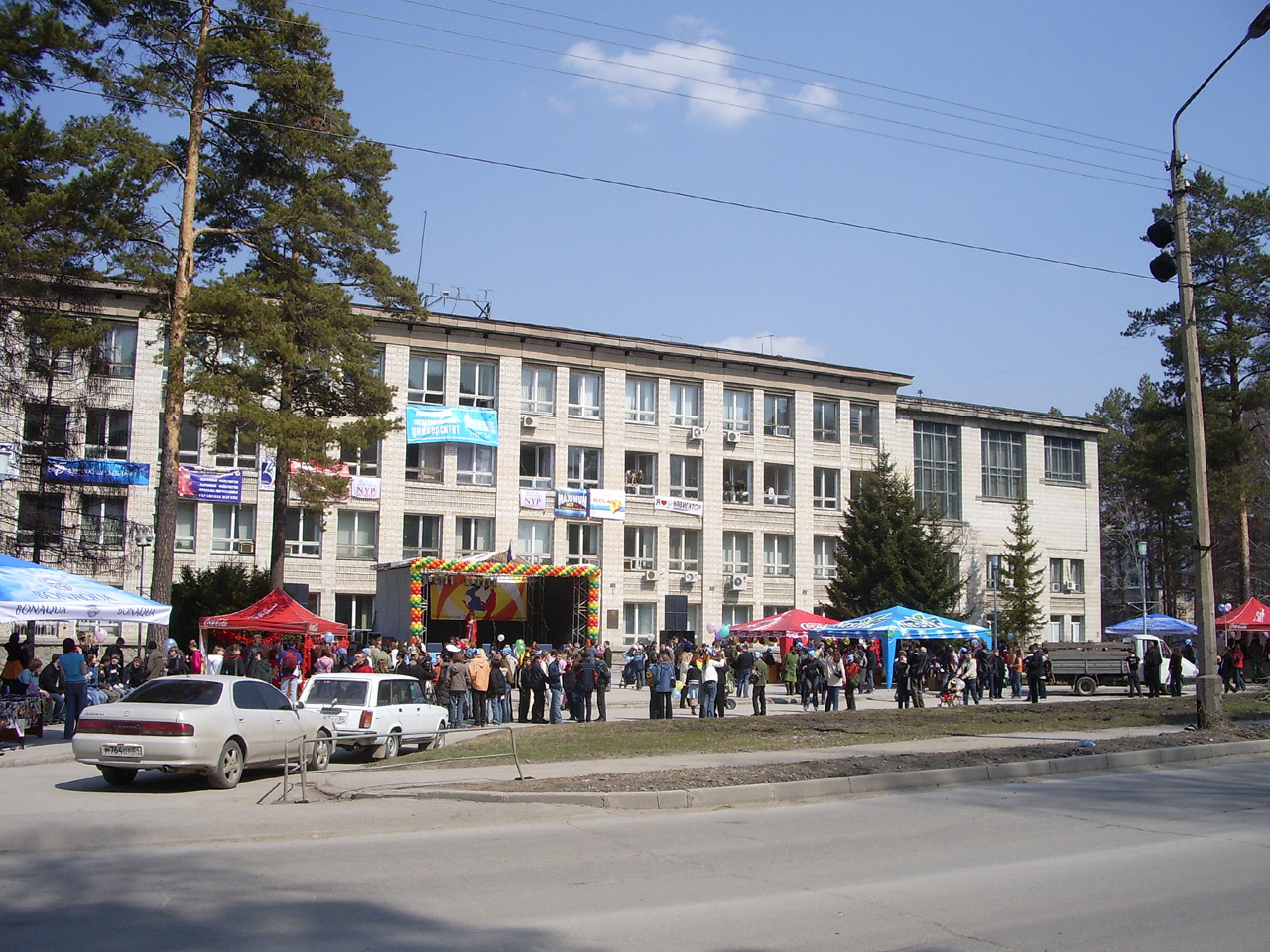

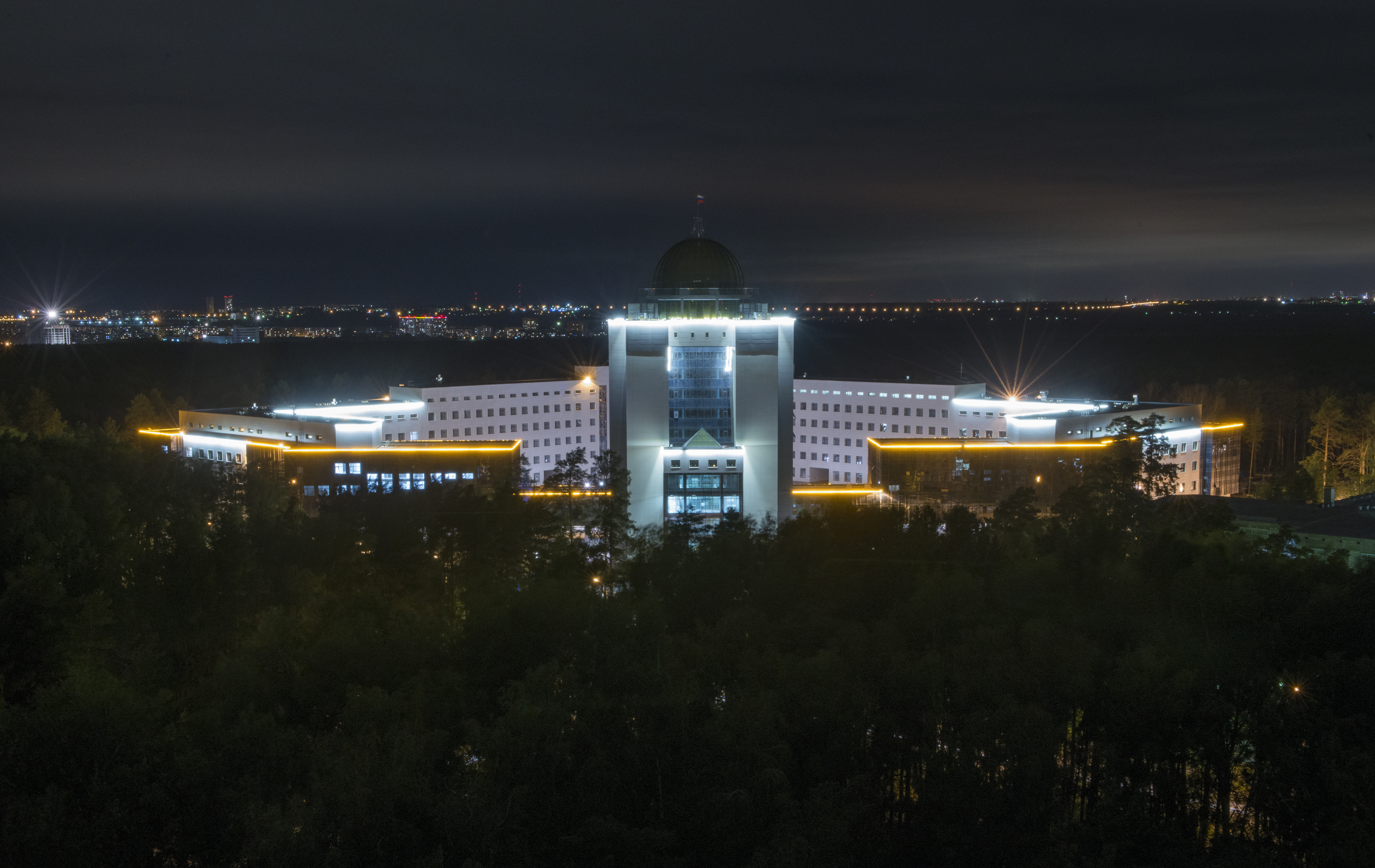

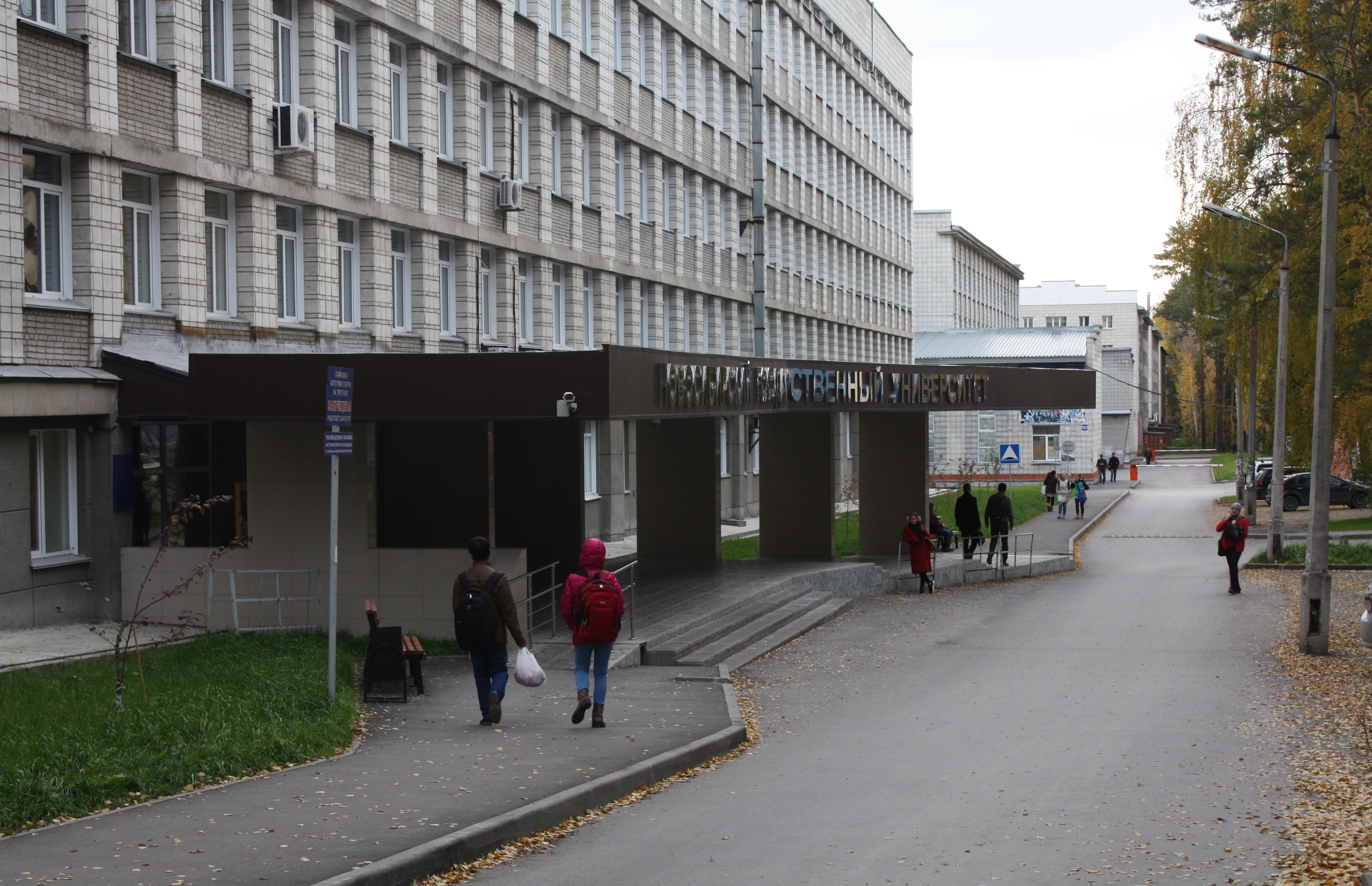

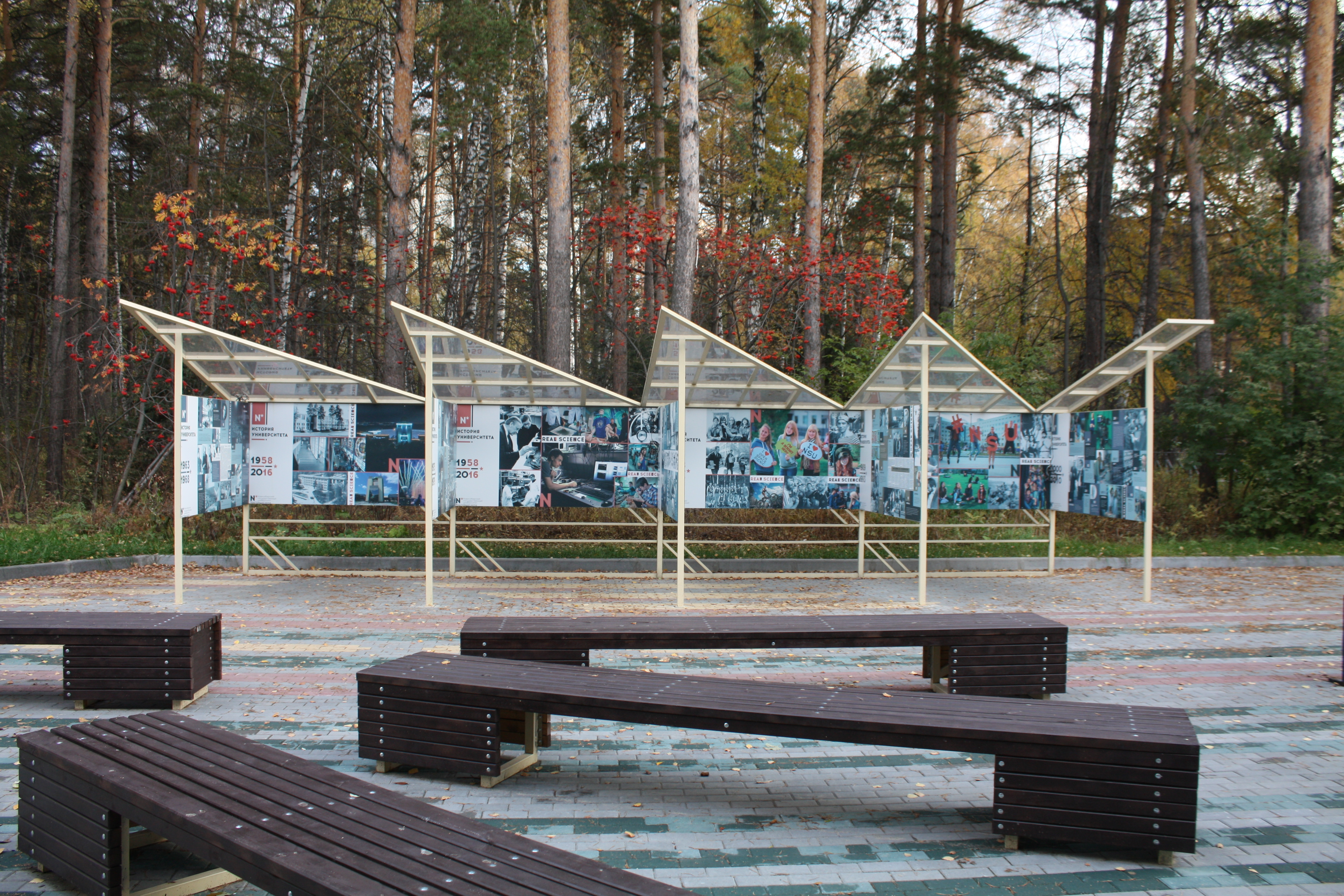

=== Novosibirsk Lavrentyev Lyceum No. 130 ===
Novosibirsk Lavrentyev Lyceum No. 130 is a school in Akademgorodok. It was founded in 1959.

== Economy ==
=== Companies ===
- Alawar Entertainment
- Center of Financial Technologies
- Sibers

== Culture ==
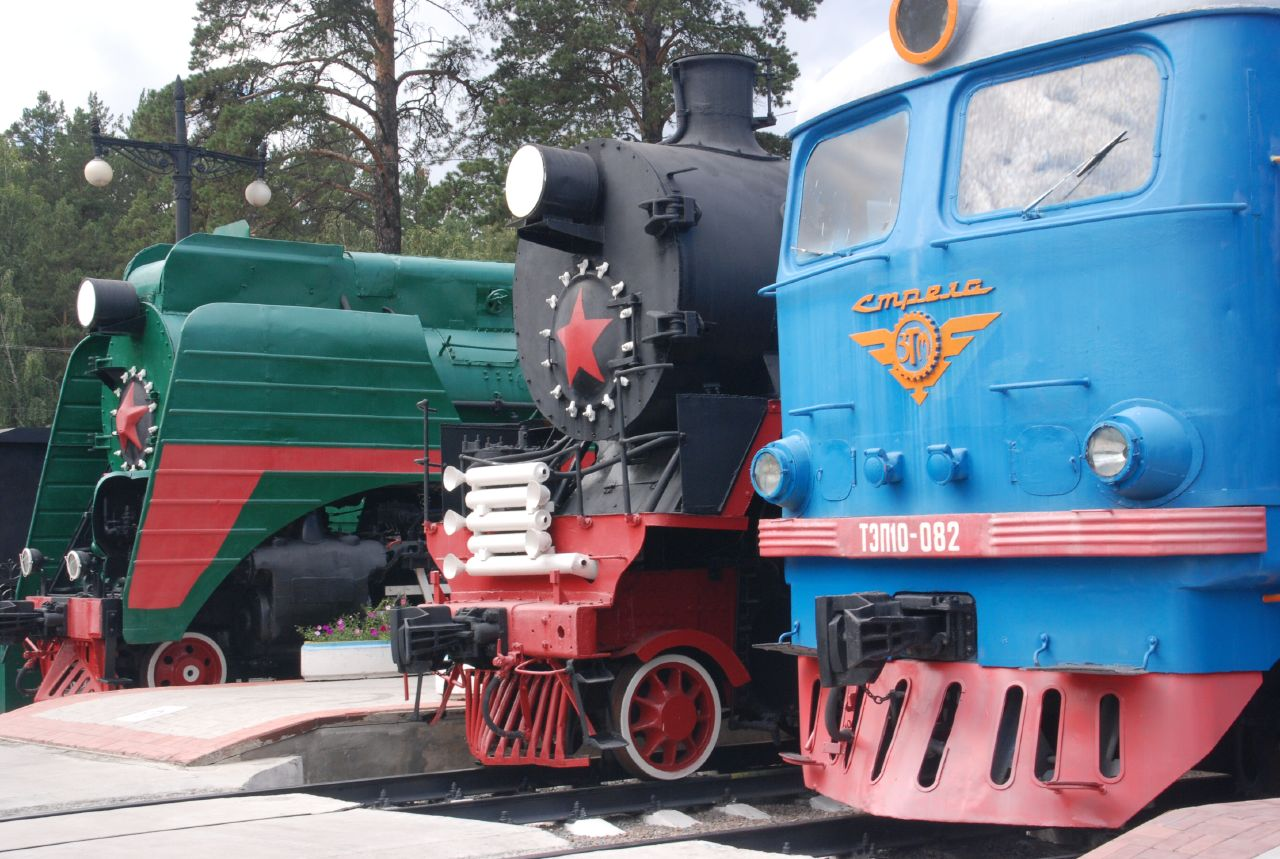
Novosibirsk Railway Museum

=== Museums ===
- Central Siberian Geological Museum
- Historical and Architectural Museum in the open air
- Museum of Archæology and Ethnography
- Novosibirsk Railway Museum

=== Houses of culture ===
- Akademia
- Houses of scientists
- Primorsky

=== Clubs ===
- Quant is a humorous club of the Department of Physics of the Novosibirsk State University, founded in 1968. It's part of the team of the KVN NSU.
- Pod integralom (Under the integral) is a Soviet discussion club, organized in the Academgorodok in the early 1960s.

== Nature ==
=== Central Siberian Botanical Garden ===
Central Siberian Botanic Garden was founded in 1961.

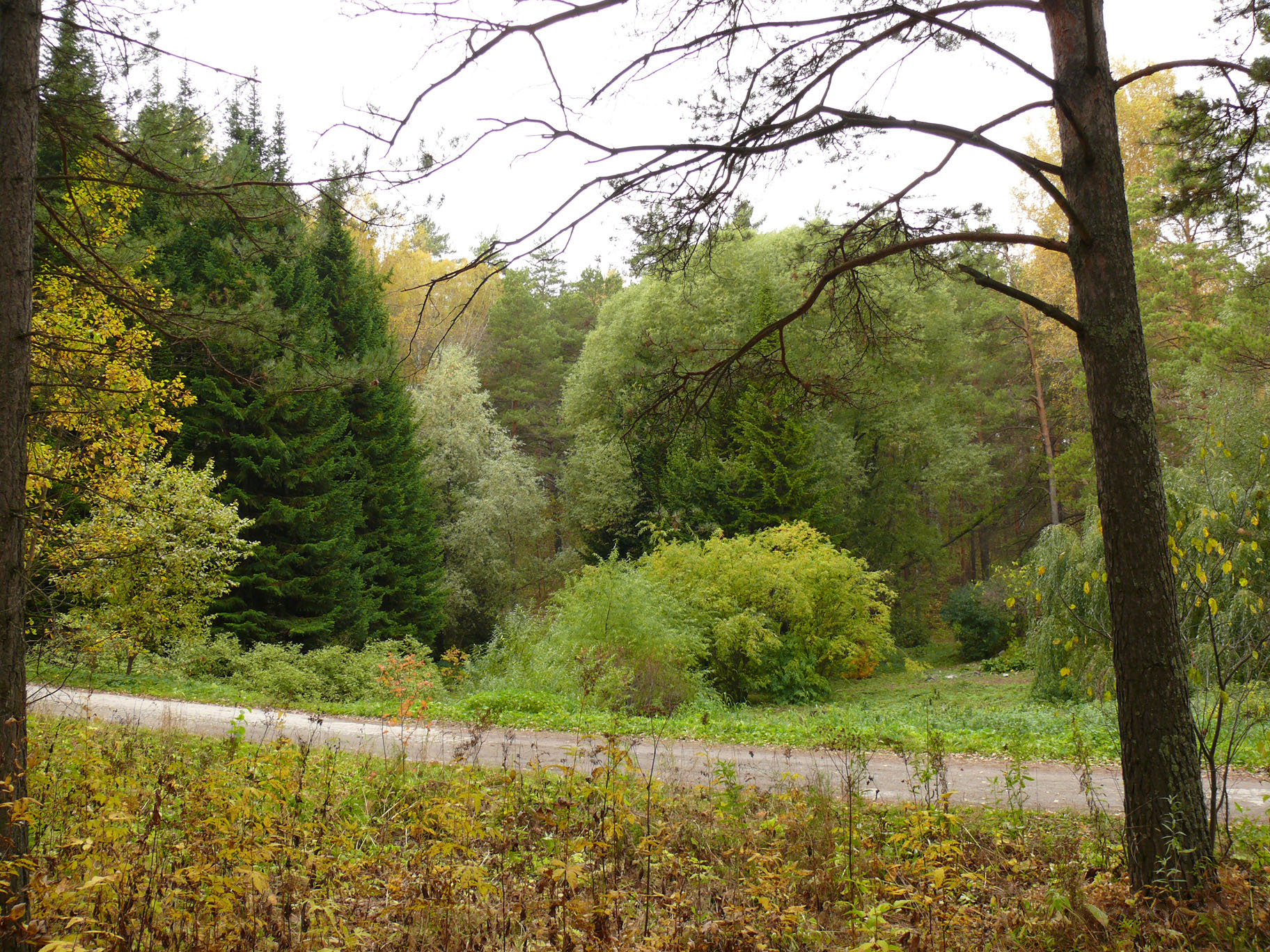

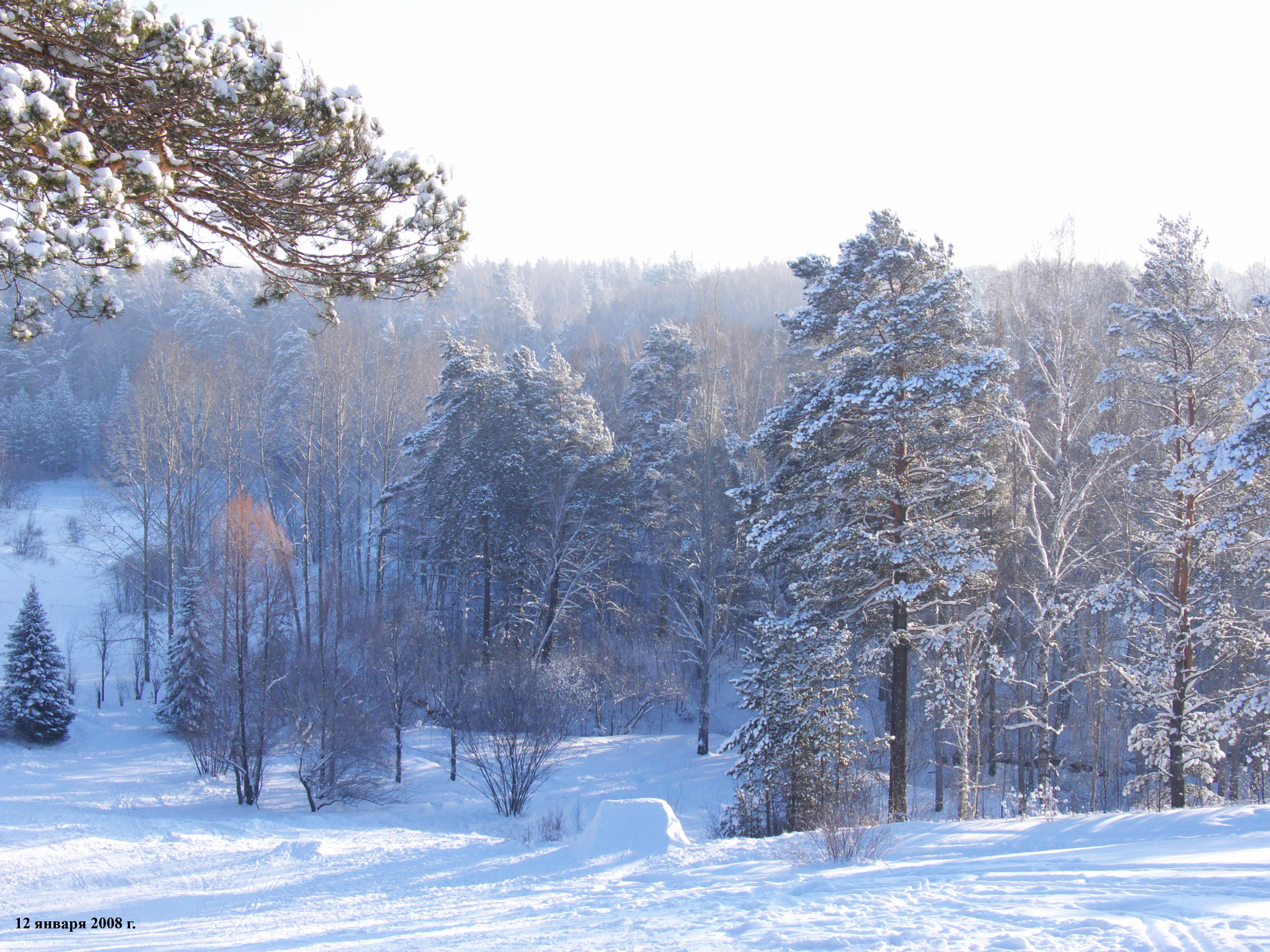

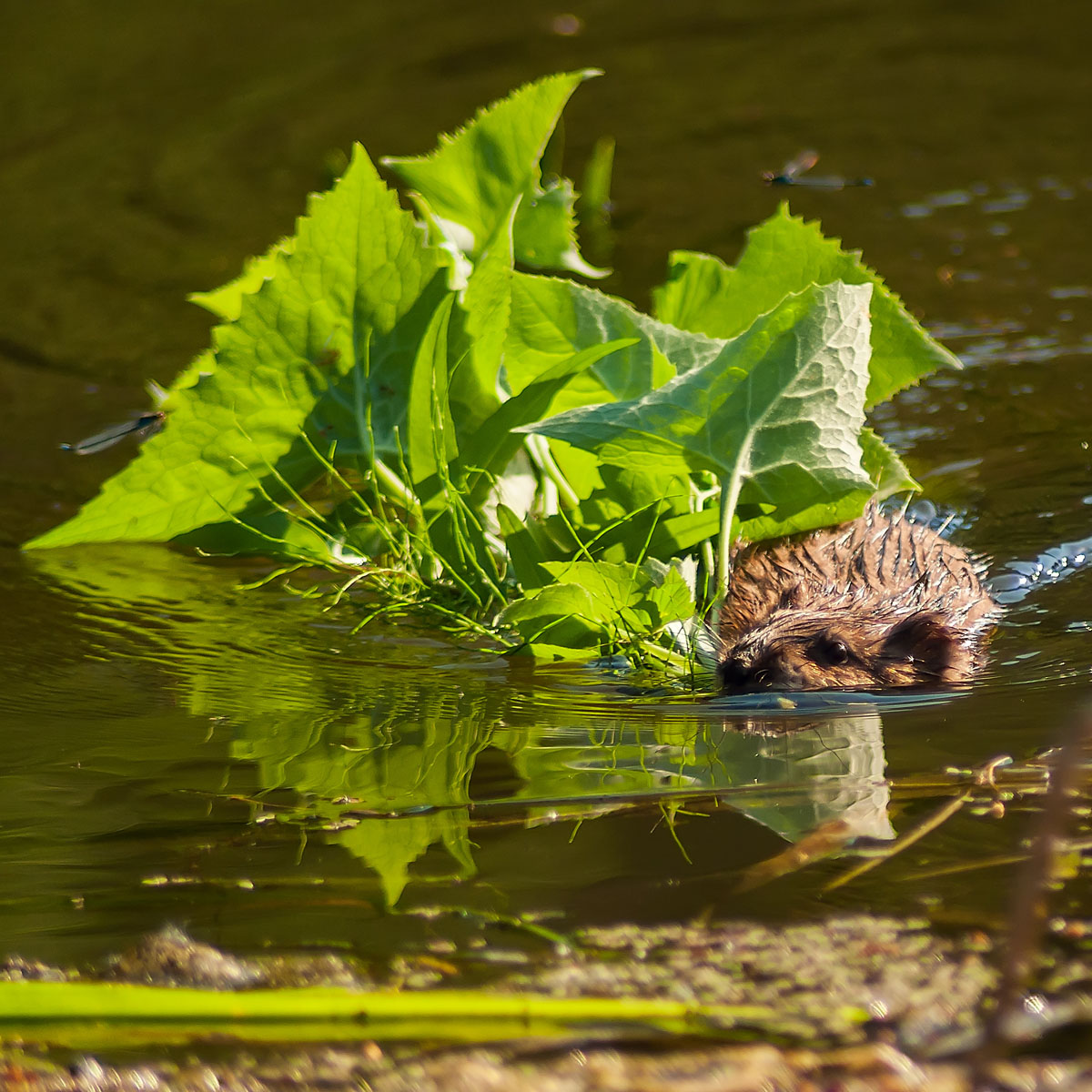
Ondatra zibethicus

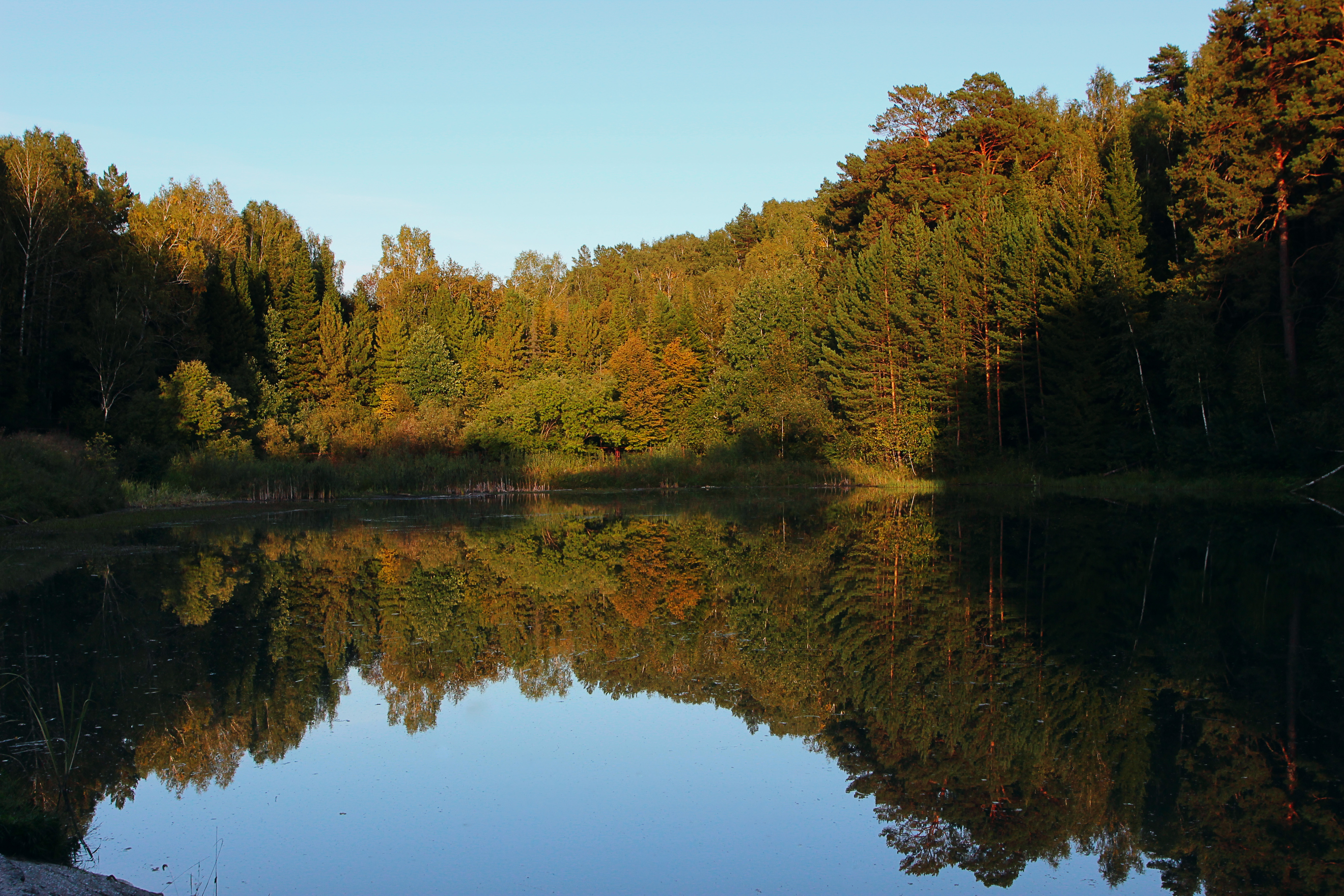

=== By the Ob Sea Park ===
By the Ob Sea is a park in the ObGES Microdistrict.

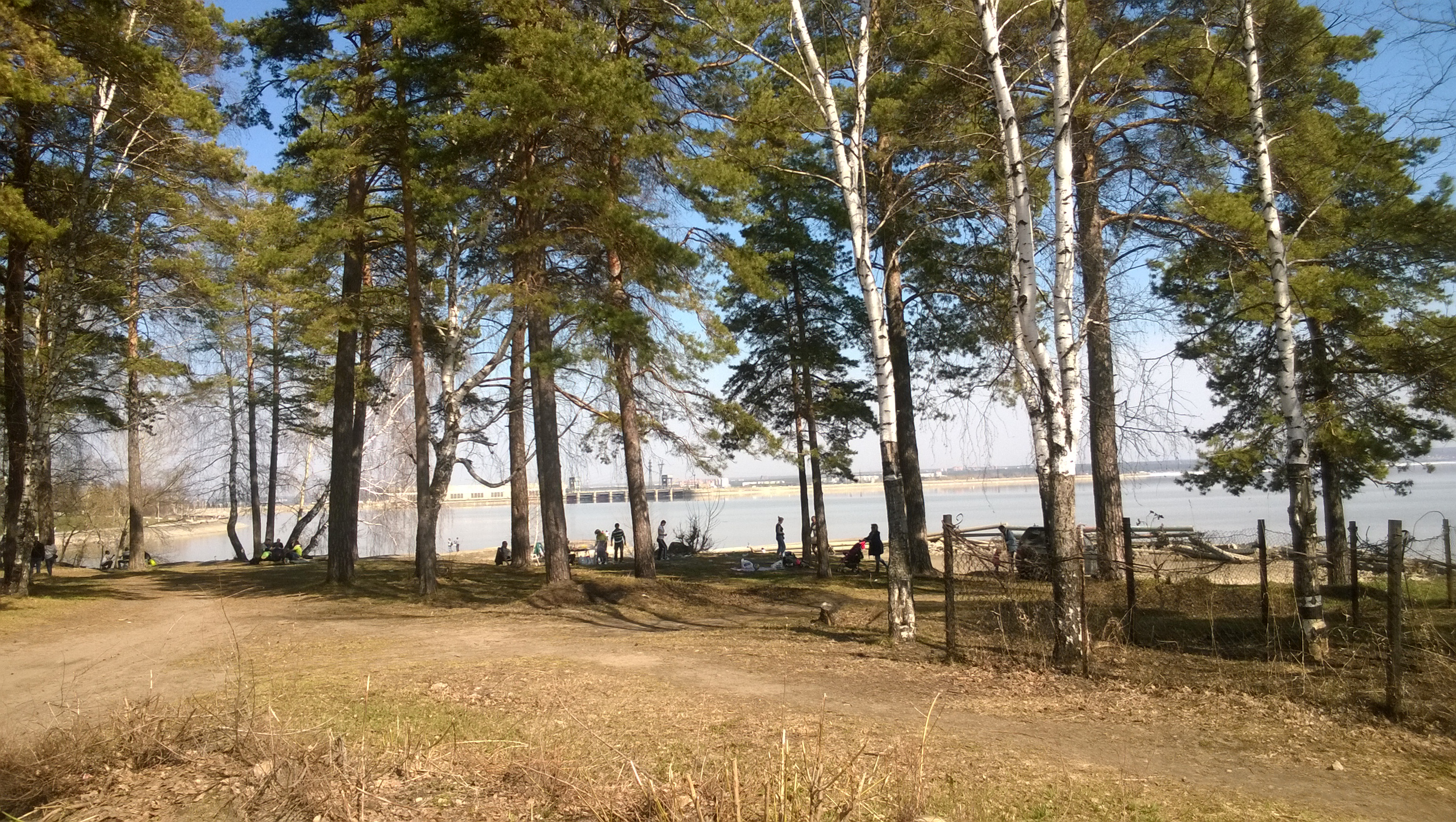

== Religion ==
=== Christianity ===
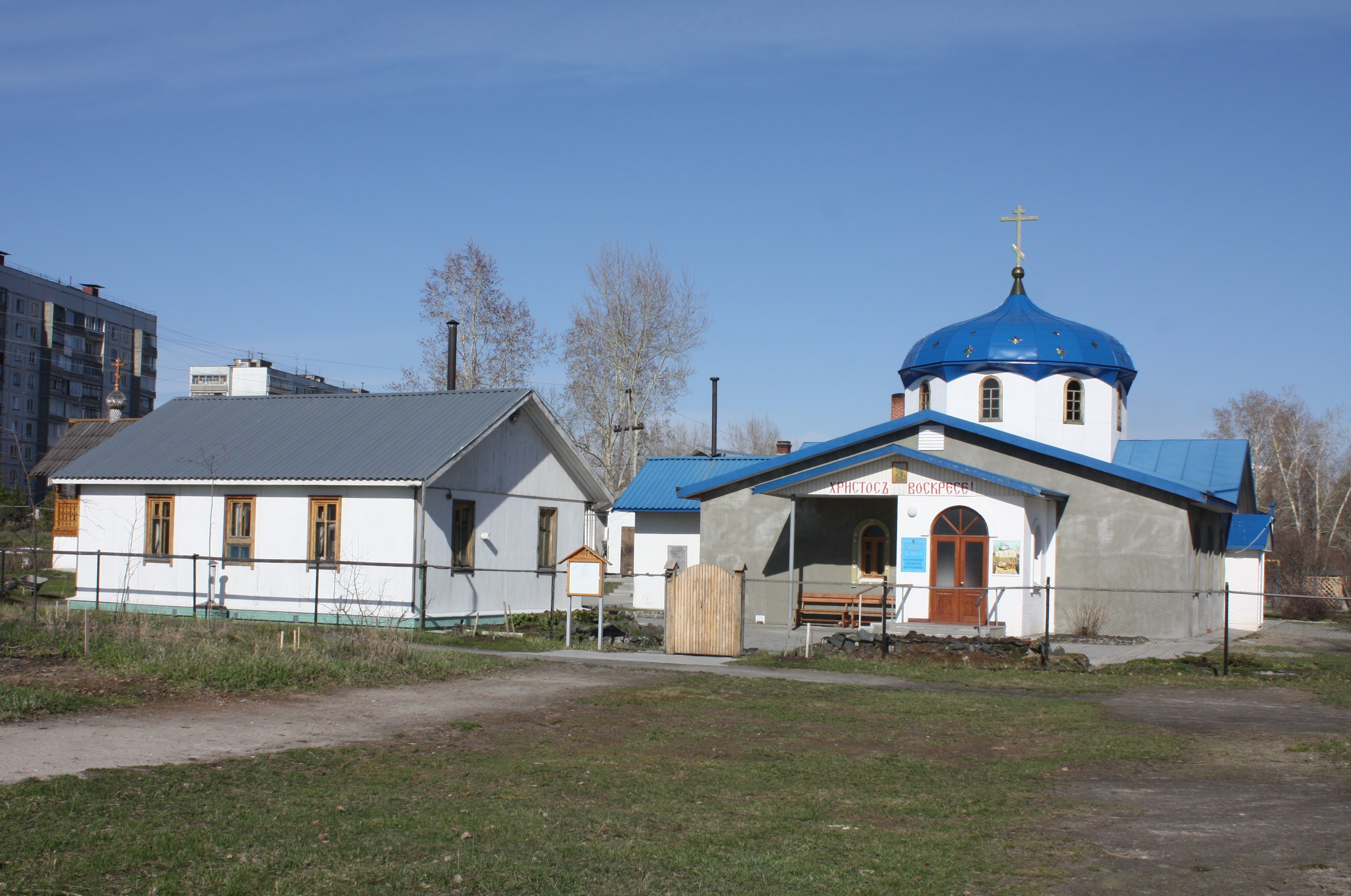
Parish of the Annunciation, Shlyuz Microdistrict

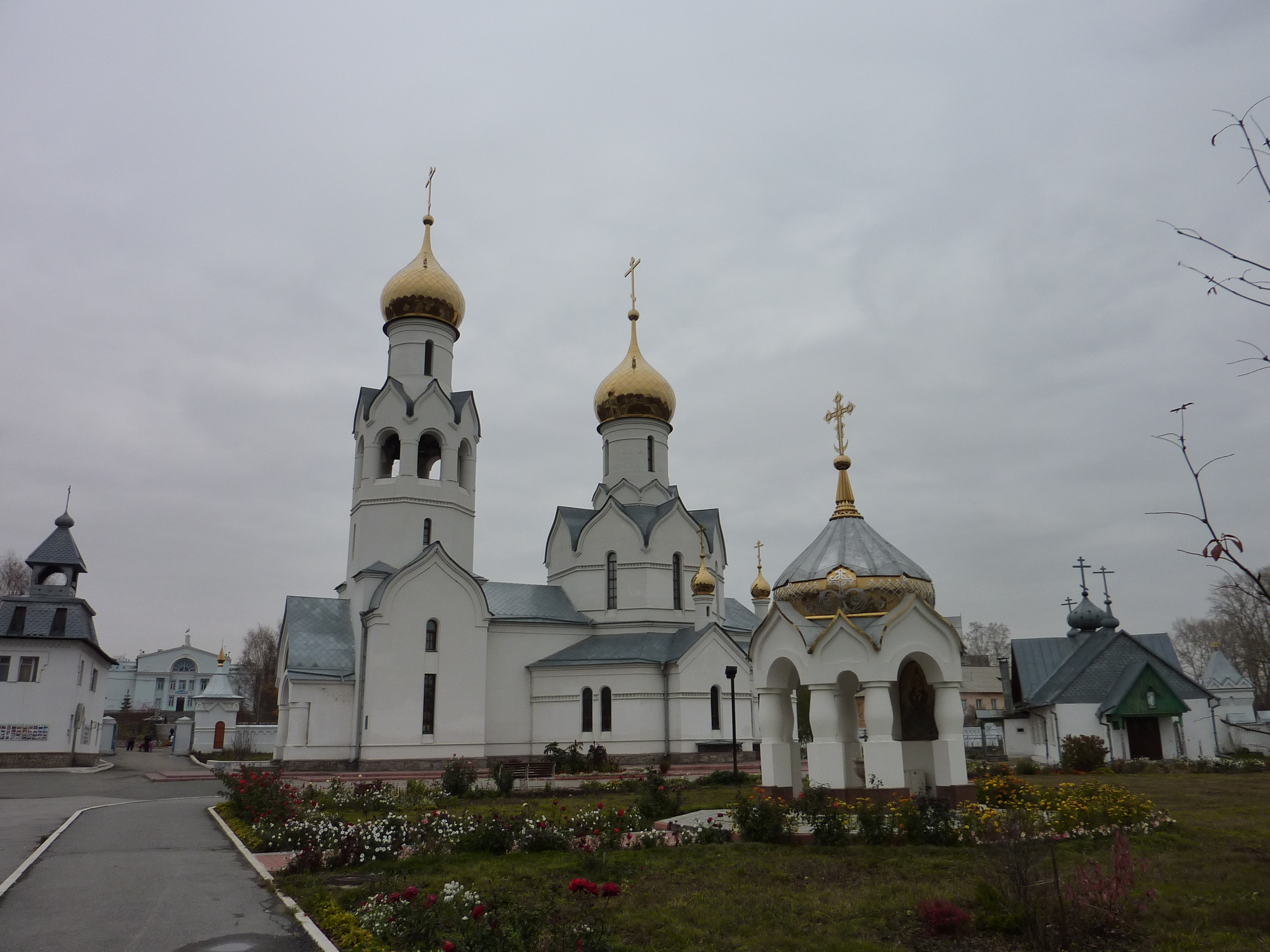
Church of the Archangel Michael, ObGES Microdistrict

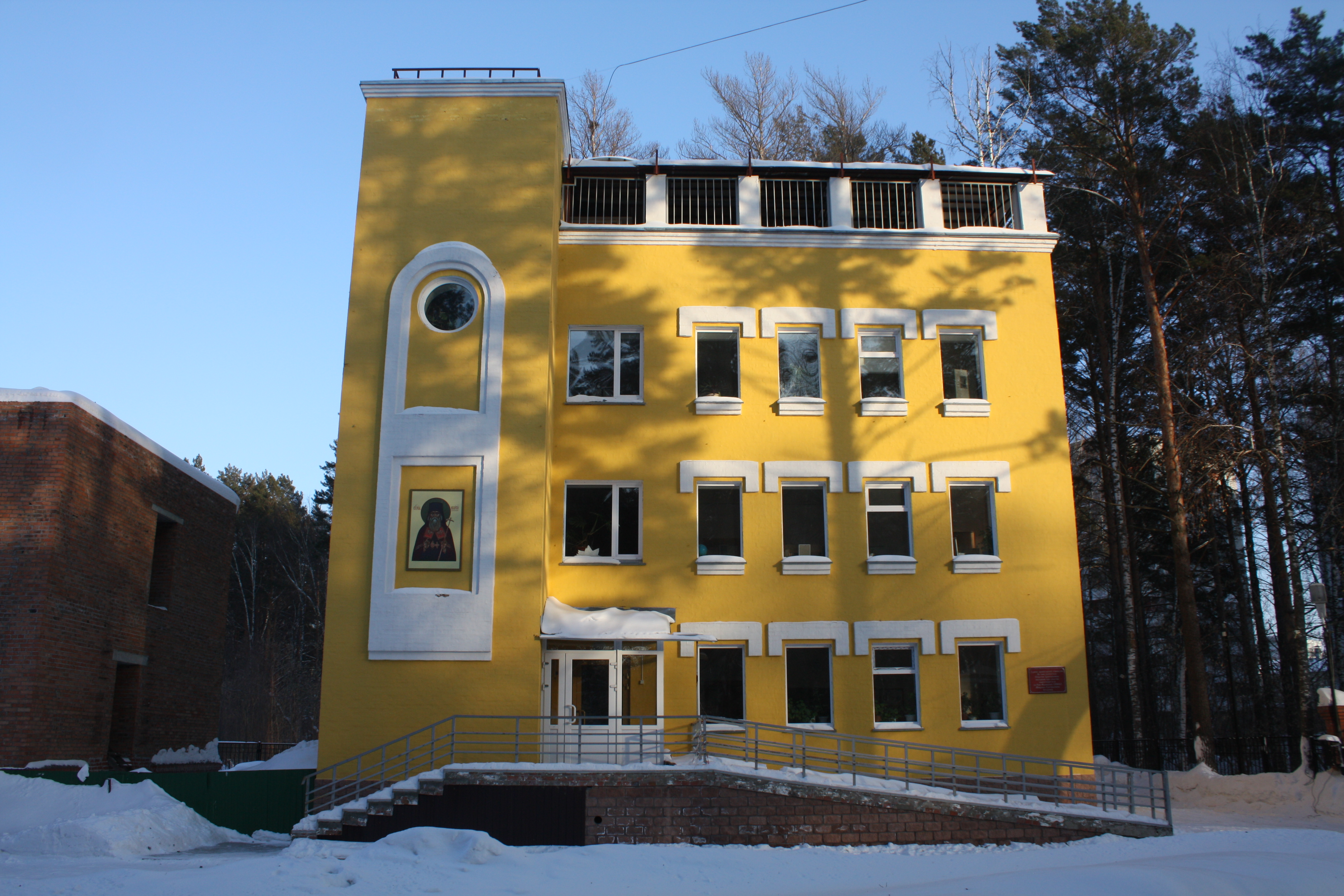
Orthodox gymnasium of Ignaty Bryanchaninov, lower zone of Akademgorodok

=== Buddhism ===
==== Rinchin Datsan in Nizhnyaya Yeltsovka ====
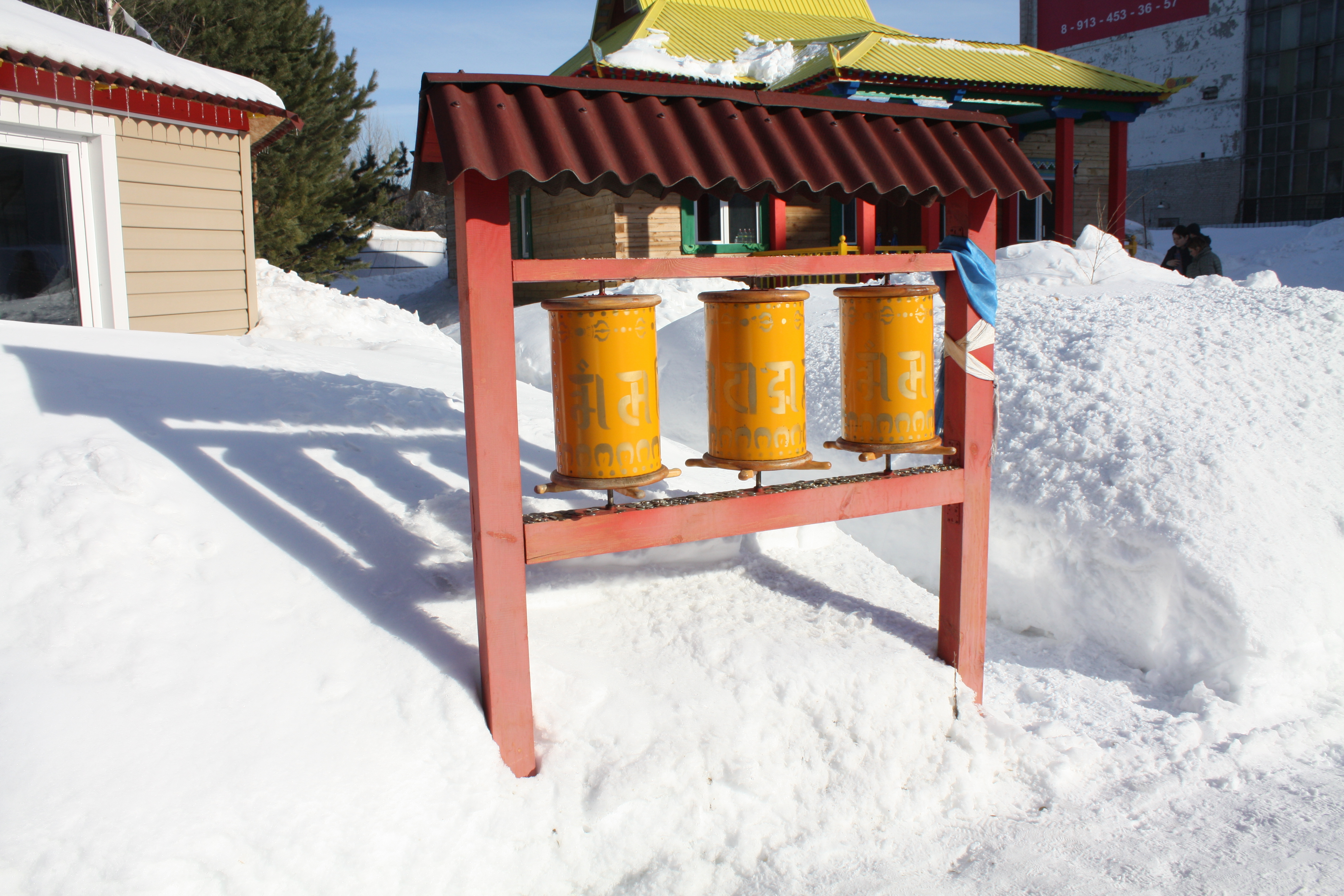

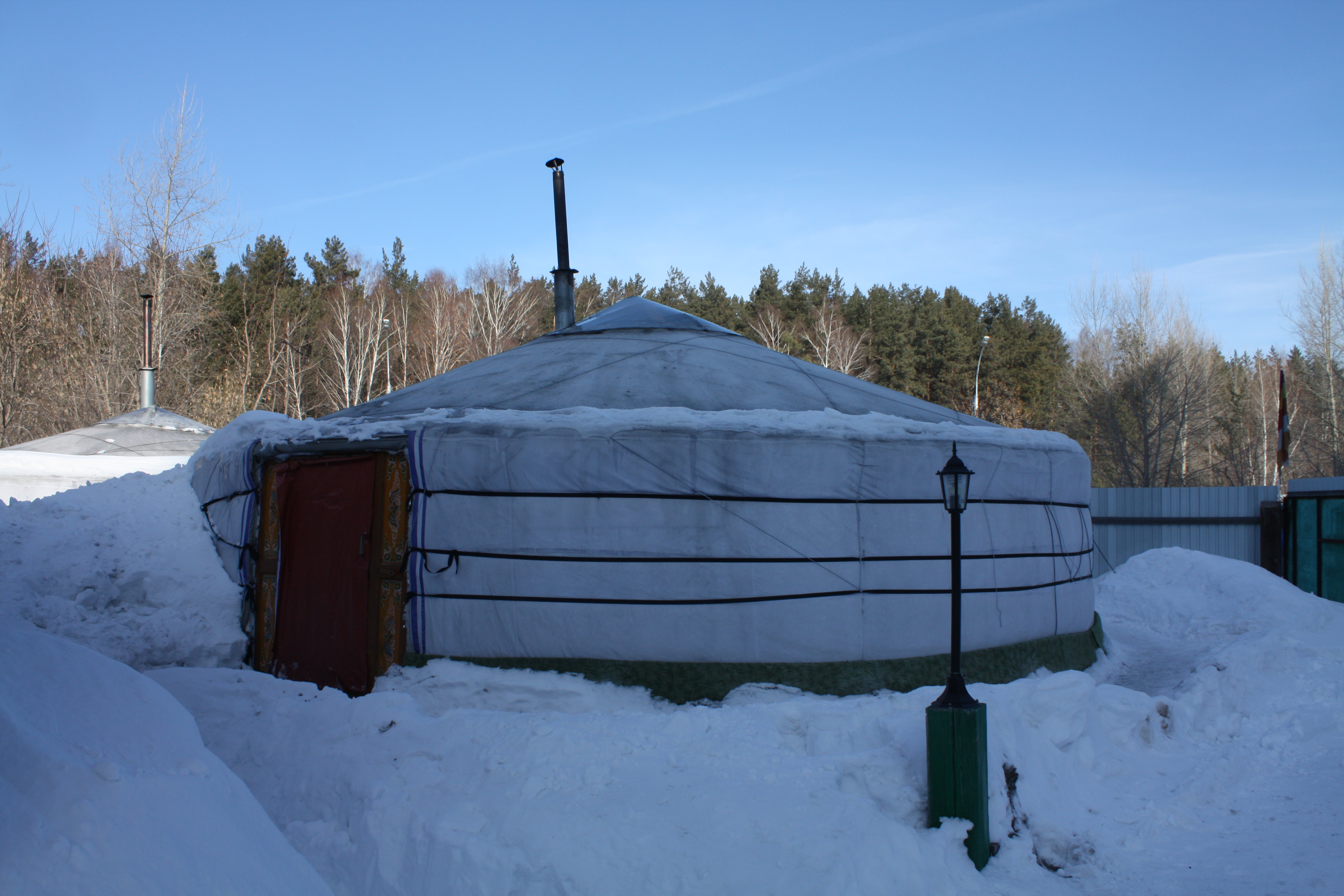

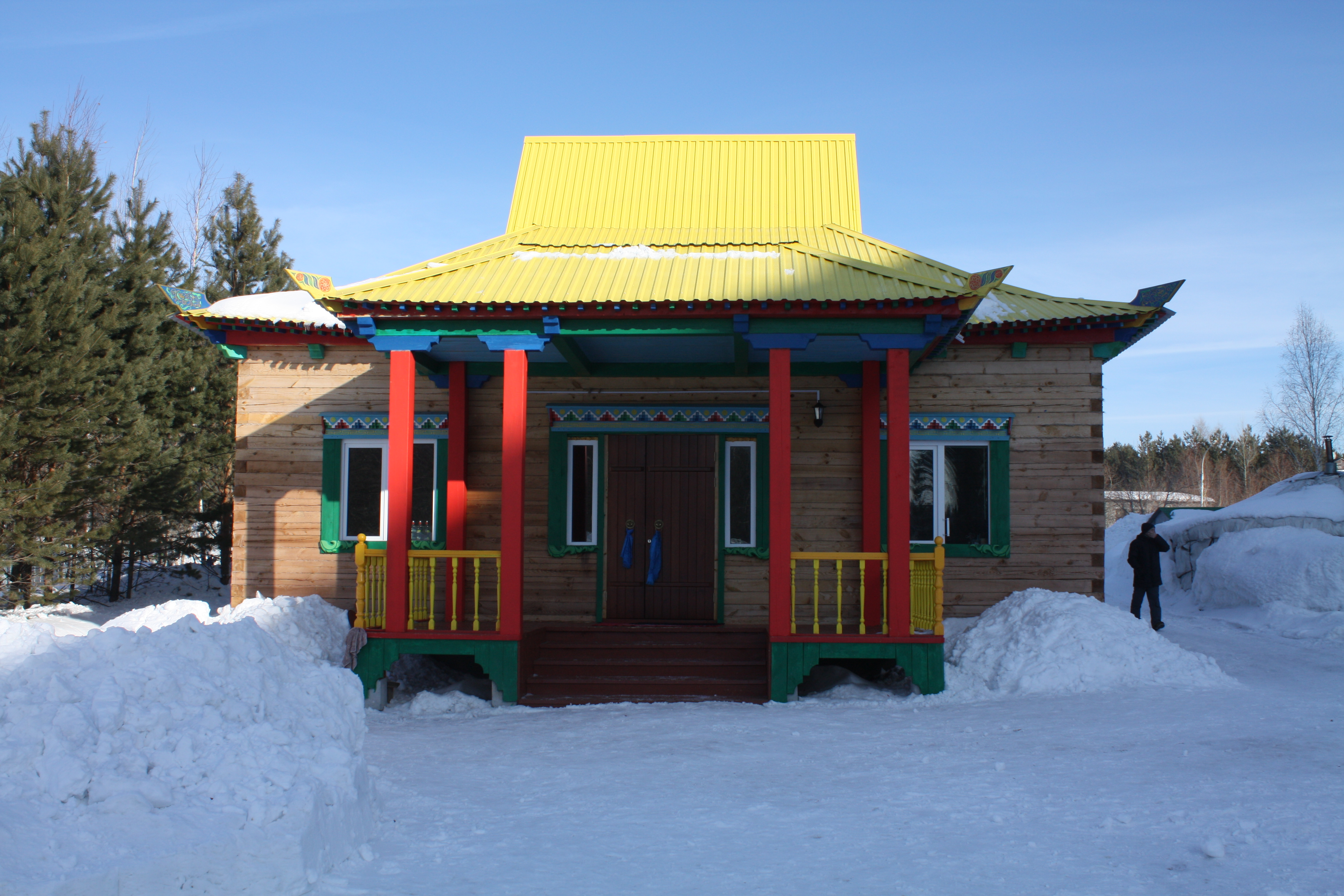

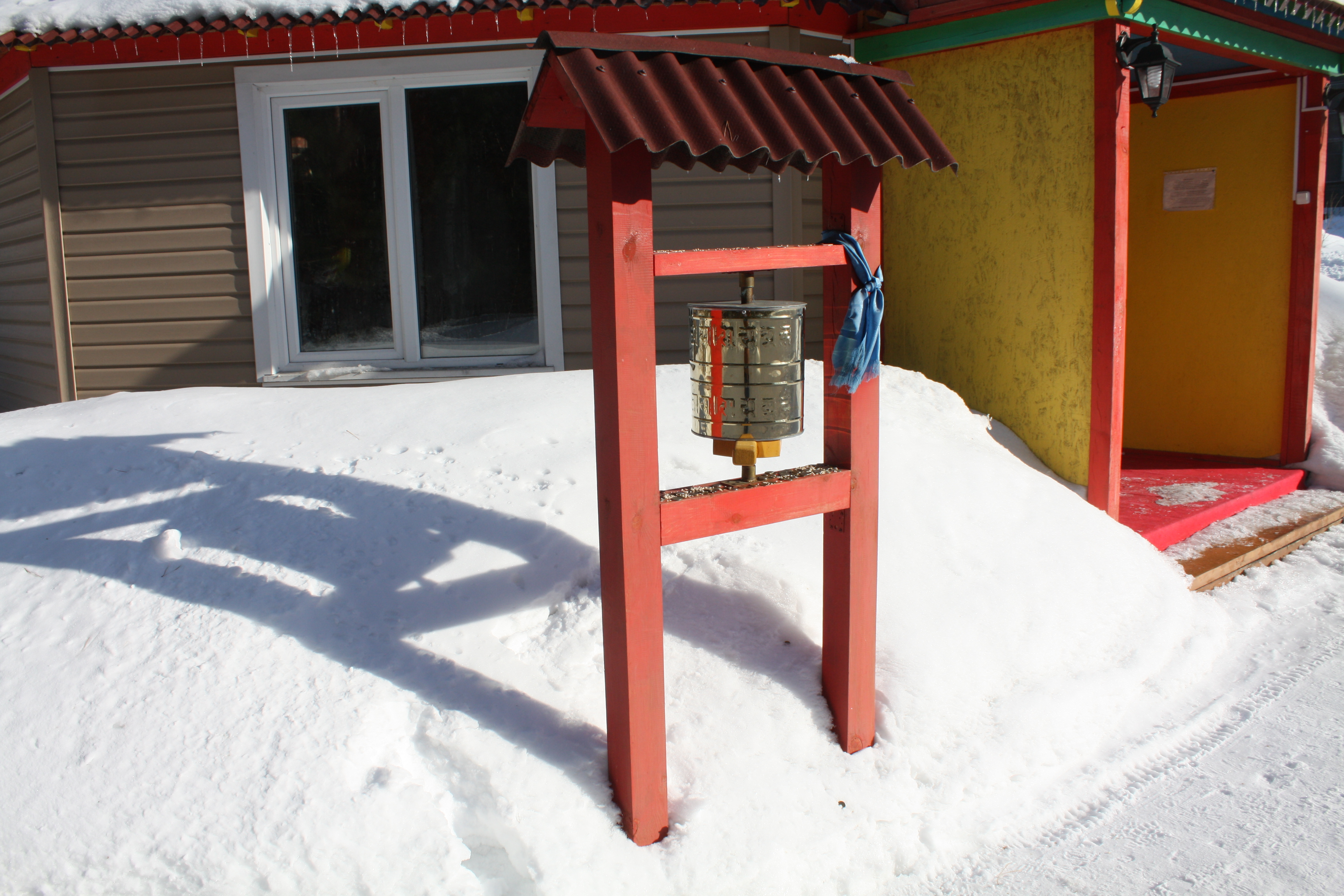

=== New religious movements ===
In 1989, the "Ashram Shambala" sect was created in the district. It consisted of approximately 20,000 followers.

== Transportation ==
=== Railway ===
Four railway stations are located in the district: Nizhnyaya Yeltsovka, Seyatel, Obskoye More and Beregovaya.

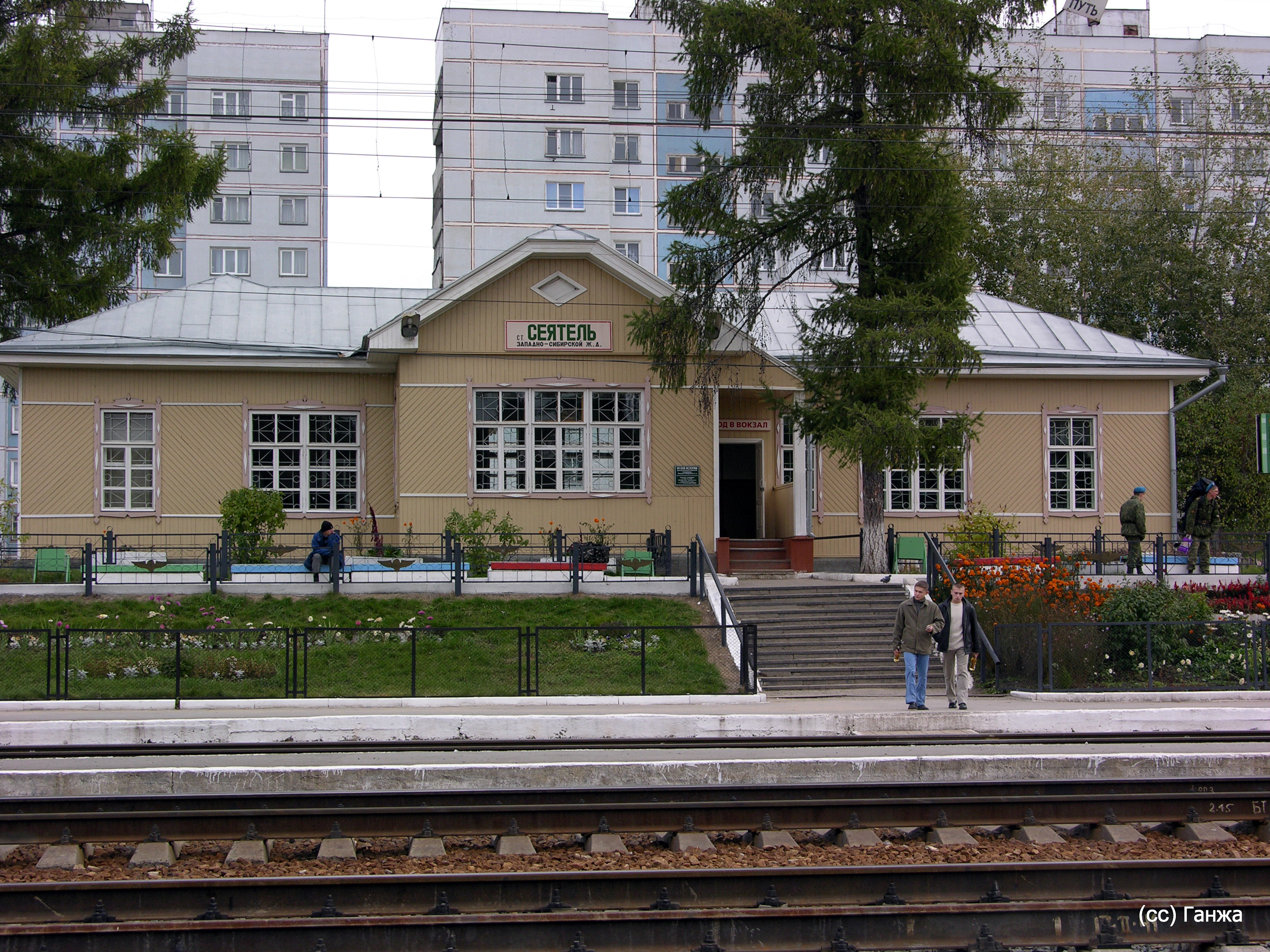
Seyatel Railway Station
