= Rinchin Datsan =

Buddhist Monastery in Russia

- Ринчин-Дацан
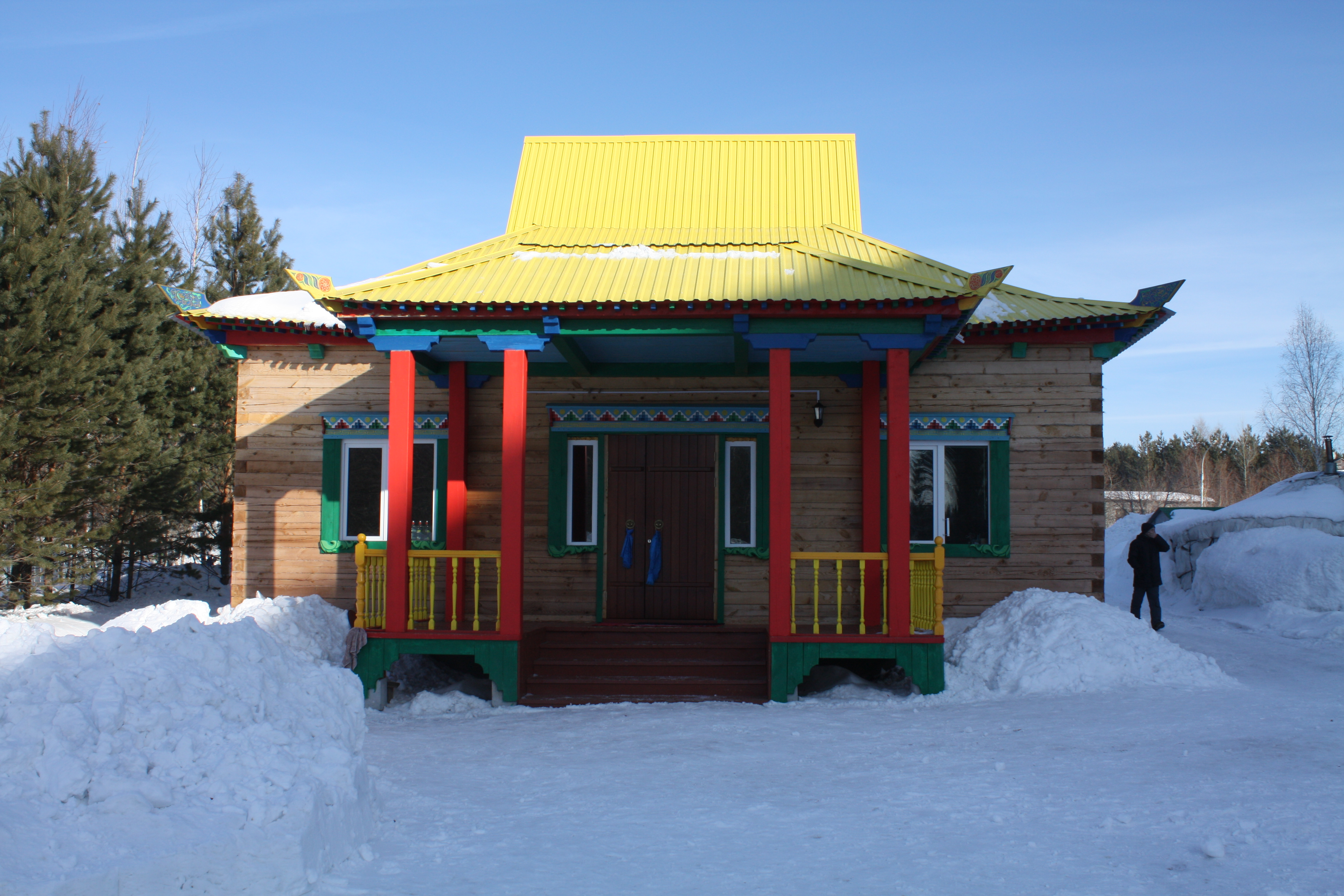
- Region: Russia
- Origin: 2015; 11 years ago Novosibirsk, Russia

Rinchin Datsan (Russian: Ринчин-дацан) is a Buddhist monastery in Sovetsky City District of Novosibirsk, Russia. It was opened in 2015.

== History ==
In 2012, the construction of the datsan began in Nizhnyaya Yeltsovka (microdistrict of Novosibirsk).

The Rinchin Datsan was opened in 2015. Eight lamas from Novosibirsk, Khakassia, Buryatia, Tuva and Gorny Altai took part in its opening, they walked around the temple an odd number of times in the direction of the sun, and then distributed to parishioners consecrated rice. Part of the altar items for the datsan brought from Nepal.

A larger temple is being built inside the territory of the religious complex. In the summer of 2019, the construction of a new Buddhist temple was almost completed.

== Gallery ==
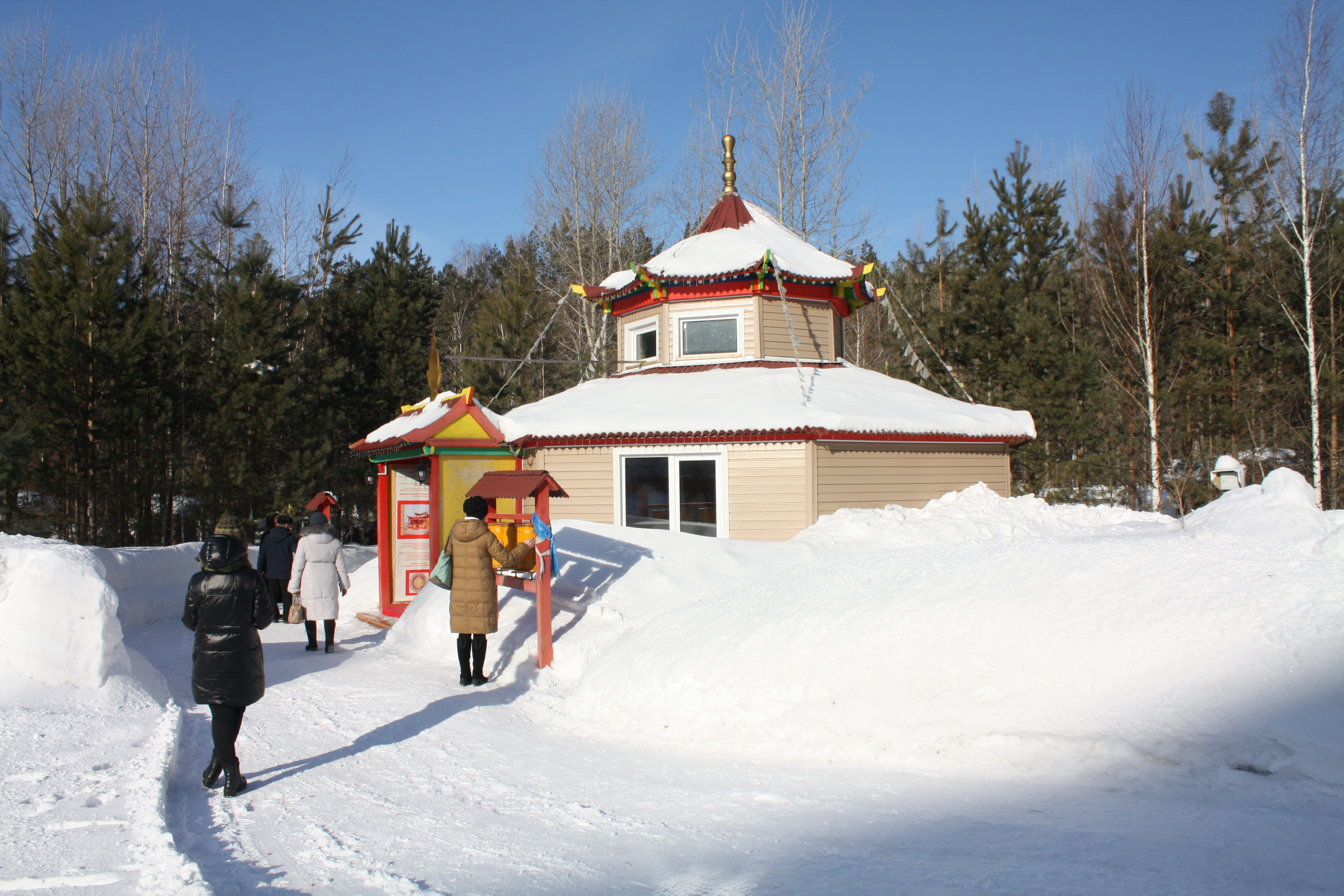

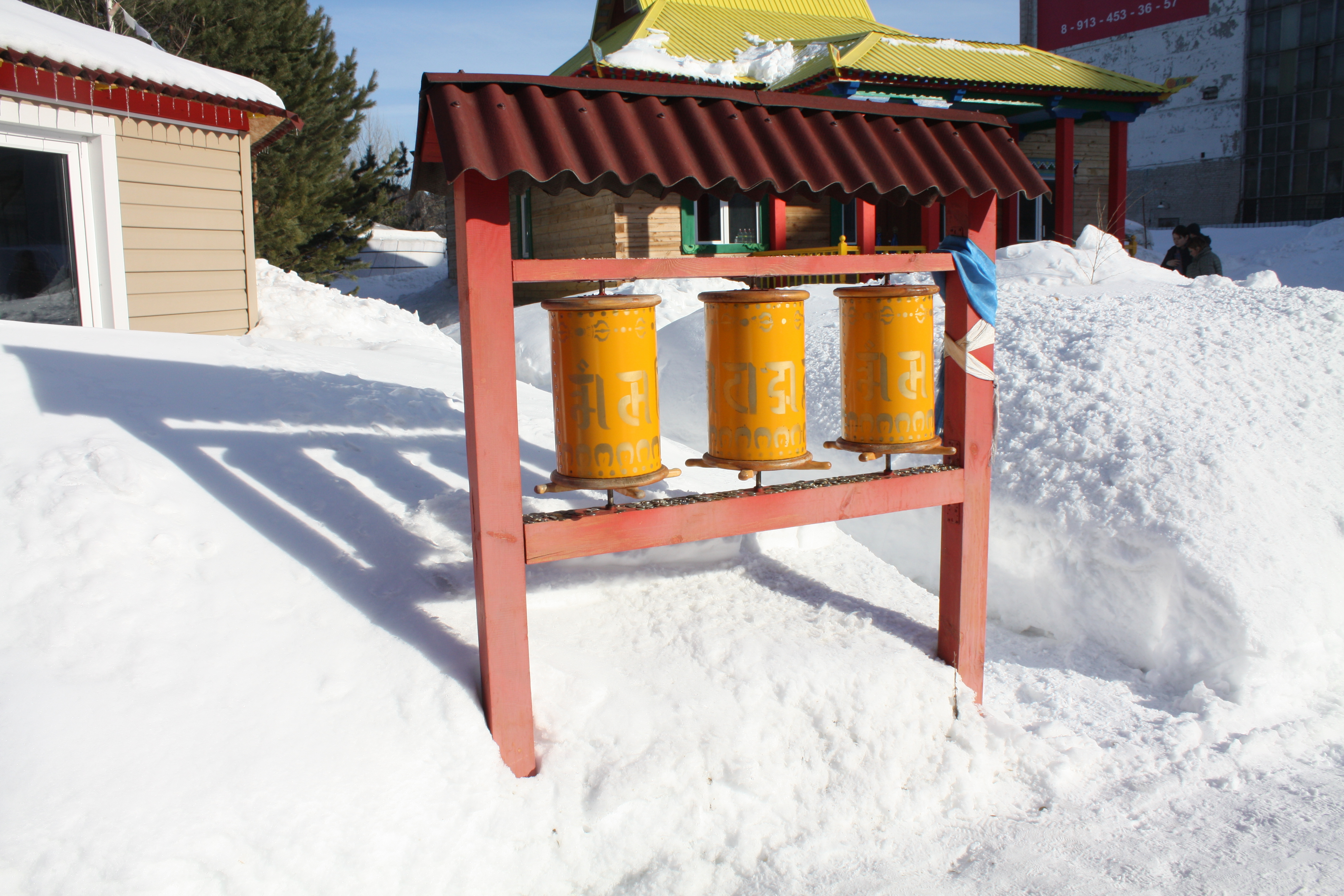

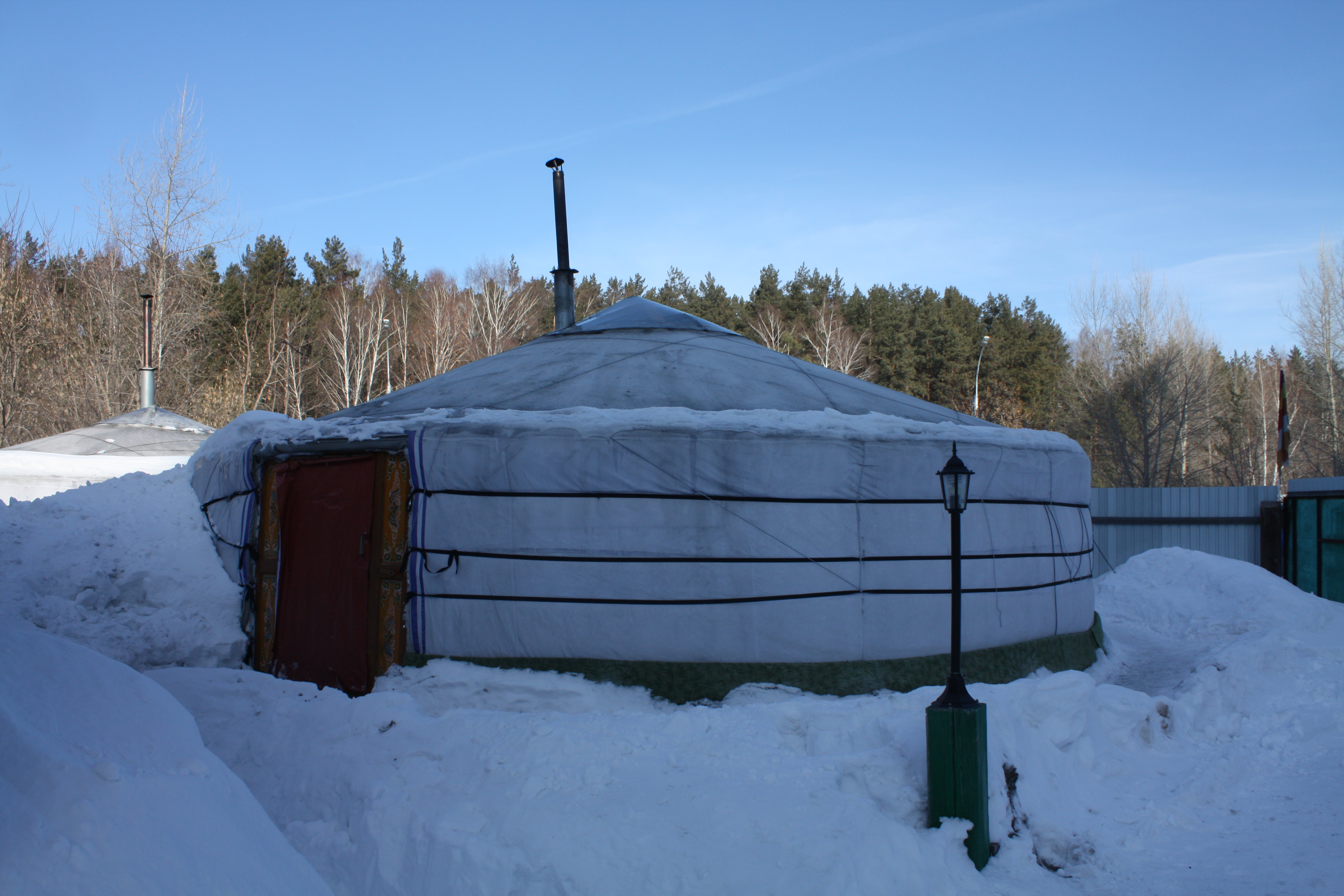

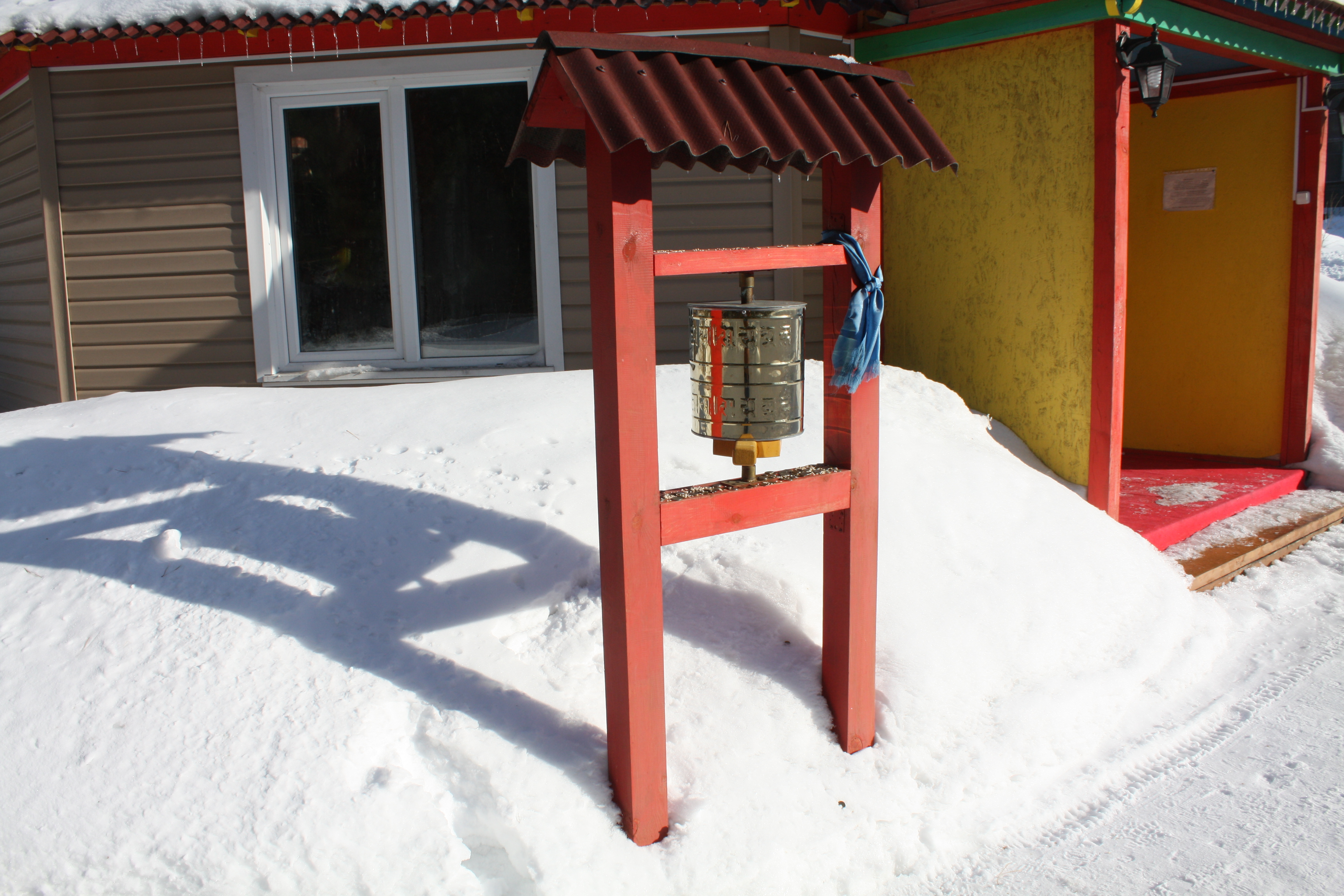
