= Ashram Shambala =

Russian religious sect

- Ашрам Шамбалы
- Region: Russia
- Founder: Konstantin Rudnev
- Origin: 1989; 37 years ago Novosibirsk, Russia
- Members: Approximately 20,000

Ashram Shambala (Russian: Ашрам Шамбалы) is a Russian occult / esoteric group founded in Novosibirsk in 1989 by Konstantin Rudnev. It has approximately 20,000 followers and branches all over Russia.

== History ==
After graduating from engineering college, Rudnev served in the Soviet Army, where he offered to create a monastery similar to Shaolin Monastery. He was sent to a psychiatric hospital in Samara for indiscriminately firing an assault rifle. In 1989, he returned to Novosibirsk, where he founded the Ashram Shambala

The group offered spiritual classes in the basement of the school on Relsovaya Street in Zaeltsovsky District. Rudnev began calling himself "Guru Sotidanandana," and claiming to have been taught by a lama in Tibet. In 1999, he was arrested and (again) sent to a psychiatric hospital, but escaped. He was detained again in 2005, but his followers refused to testify against him.

=== Arrest and trial ===
Rudnev was arrested again in 2010. A search of group members' houses revealed audio and video recordings of their rituals, ritual accessories, as well as four grams of heroin. In 2013, a Novosibirsk court found Rudnev guilty of rape, indecent assault, distributing illegal drugs, and leading a violent organization; and sentenced him to 11 years in a corrective labor colony.

=== Return of confiscated property ===
A year later, the court returned the cottages and cars that had been confiscated from group members. In March 2016, the Central District Court of Novosibirsk returned gold and money to Rudnev's assistant, the "priestess" Oksana Spiridonova.

== Features ==
Rudnev called himself an "extraterrestrial from Sirius". His followers called him "Great Shaman Shri Dzhnan Avatar Muni." He is the author of a book, The Way of the Fool.

Adherents of the group are claimed to have practiced group sex and bestiality.

Allegedly, they slept three or four hours a day and ate very little. People lost their teeth, only to be told that they would be reborn as sixth-race beings fed by divine energy, who do not need teeth.

== Sources of income ==
Rudnev organized seminars on yoga, the esoteric foundations of business, sexual liberation, and other subjects. In 2010, a similar lecture by the guru of "Ashram Shambala" cost 53 thousand rubles per person.

The group sold various magic items: amulets and talismans.

People sold their apartments, cars and gave all the money to the group.

== Headquarters ==
The group's headquarters is located in a mansion on Kosmonavtov Street 1a in the Sovetsky District of Novosibirsk.

== Bibliography ==
- Alban Bourdy, Un Bisounours au pays des se(x)ctes, Books On Demand, 2018. A testimony of a former follower of the sect.
