= Khristianovich Institute of Theoretical and Applied Mechanics =

Research institute in Akademgorodok of Novosibirsk, Russia

Khristianovich Institute of Theoretical and Applied Mechanics of the Siberian Branch of the RAS
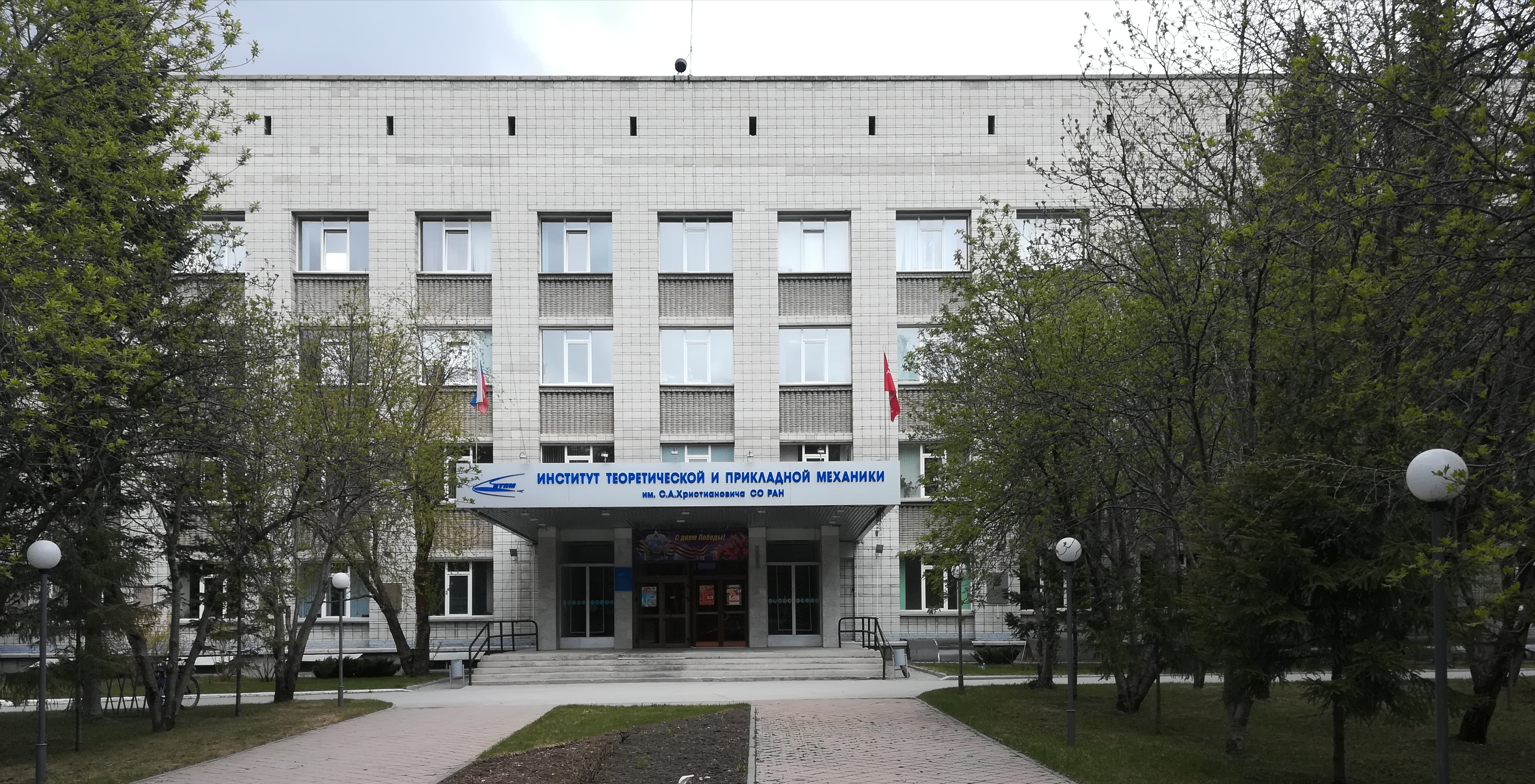
- Founder: Sergey Khristianovich
- Established: 1957
- Director: Alexandr Shiplyuk
- Owner: Siberian Branch of RAS
- Address: Institutskaya Street 4/1, Novosibirsk, 630090, Russia
- Location: Novosibirsk, Russia
- Website: www.itam.nsc.ru

Khristianovich Institute of Theoretical and Applied Mechanics of the Siberian Branch of the RAS, ITAM SB RAS (Russian: Институт теоретической и прикладной механики имени С. А. Христиановича СО РАН) is a research institute in Akademgorodok of Novosibirsk, Russia. It was founded in 1957.

== History ==
The institute was founded by Sergey Khristianovich in 1957, he also became its first director. In 1957, the institute was located within the territory of SibNIA, where it was engaged in the creation of a supersonic wind tunnel until 1960.

In 1991, the International Center for Aerophysical Research (ICAR) was established at the institute. In 1997, the institute became a member of the International Supersonic Tunnel Association (STAI).

In 2005, the institute was named after Sergey Khristianovich.

As of 2023, three scientists at the institute had been arrested on suspicion of treason of sharing hypersonic technology.

== Scientific activity ==
The main directions of scientific research are physical-chemical mechanics, aerogasdynamics, mathematical modeling in mechanics, mechanics of rigid body, deformations, and destructions.

== Magazines ==
- Combustion, Explosion, and Shock Waves (together with the SB RAS, LIH SB RAS, ICKC SB RAS)
- Prikladnaya Mekhanika i Tekhnicheskaya Fizika (together with the SB RAS, LIH SB RAS)
- Teplofizika i Aeromekhanika (together with the SB RAS, IT SB RAS)
- Fizicheskaya Mezomekhanika (together with the SB RAS, ISPMS SB RAS)

== Notable employees ==
- Vladimir Aniskin is a miniature sculptor, Senior Researcher at the ITAM SB RAS, Guinness World Record Holder.

== Branches ==
- Tyumen Division of Khristianovich Institute of Theoretical and Applied Mechanics of the Siberian Branch of the RAS
- Pilot Plant, it is located in ObGES Microdistrict of Novosibirsk

== Bibliography ==
- Ламин В. А. (2003). Энциклопедия. Новосибирск. Новосибирск: Новосибирское книжное издательство. pp. 376–377. ISBN 5-7620-0968-8.
