= Valentin Danilov =

Russian physicist

Valentin Danilov (Russian: Валентин Данилов, born 1948) is a Russian physicist, whose research deals with the effect of solar activity on space satellites. In November 2004, he was found guilty and sentenced to 14 years for treason. Many scientists and human rights organizations, both in Russia and worldwide protested the sentence because the information he passed to China was, in fact, declassified in 1992.

Danilov was head of the Thermo-Physics Centre at Krasnoyarsk State Technical University (KTSU). In 1999, he has signed a contract between the KSTU and China Aerospace Science and Technology Corporation. KSTU was supposed to make a test bench used to emulate effect of space on man-made satellites

In February 2001, Danilov was arrested by FSB, accused of treason, but released on bail October 2, 2002. He was acquitted by a jury of all charges on December 29, 2003.

June 9, 2004 - the Supreme Court of Russia overturned Danilov's acquittal of treason. In November 2004, another jury convicted Danilov of espionage. He was subsequently sentenced to 14 years in jail for treason. According to human rights organizations, his sentence was unjustified, because Danilov provided documents to the court showing that all the "secret information" has been in fact declassified.

According to a statement by Amnesty International, "as in the case of Igor Sutyagin, his first trial ended in acquittal; the court concluded that the prosecution had not established violations of the law by Valentin Danilov. In June 2004, the Supreme Court of Russia quashed the verdict of acquittal; following a second, closed trial, Valentin Danilov was convicted of treason (Article 275 of the Russian Criminal Code) and sentenced to 14 years’ imprisonment in November 2004." Danilov was released on parole in Krasnoyarsk in November 2012. He said he would like to continue his scientific career in Novosibirsk.

In 2020, the European Court of Human Rights held that there had been a violation of the right to a fair trial with respect to Danilov.

== See also ==
- Dmitri Kolker
- Anatoly Maslov
- Alexandr Shiplyuk
- Valery Golubkin
