= Anatoly Maslov =

Russian physicist

Anatoly Alexandrovich Maslov (Russian: Анатолий Александрович Маслов; born 7 August 1946) is a Russian physicist and a professor at the Aerohydrodynamic Department at the Novosibirsk State Technical University, specialist in the field of laminar–turbulent transition.

== Biography ==
In 1973, Anatoly Maslov defended his Ph.D. thesis "Stability of a compressible boundary layer over a cooled surface"; in 1988, he defended his doctoral dissertation "The onset of turbulence in supersonic boundary layers". In the same year, the scientist became the head of Laboratory No.13 of Physical Problems of Control of Gas-Dynamic Flows at the Khristianovich Institute of Theoretical and Applied Mechanics. Thanks to the skills of experimental work and numerical simulation in supersonic aerodynamics, as well as experience in large aerodynamic installations, he significantly intensified the scientific activity of the laboratory.

=== Suspicion of state treason and arrest ===
On 28 June 2022, Anatoly Maslov was arrested on suspicion of state treason. He was taken by plane to Moscow and placed in the Lefortovo pre-trial detention center. A few days later, another Novosibirsk scientist, Dmitry Kolker was also arrested on suspicion of state treason. The trial has been registered with the St. Petersburg City Court on May 12, 2023, in a "top secret" case according to the court’s press office. On 21 May 2024, he was sentenced to 14 years in prison.

== See also ==
- Valentin Danilov
- Alexandr Shiplyuk
- Dmitri Kolker
