= Sovetskoye Highway =

Street in Novosibirsk, Russia

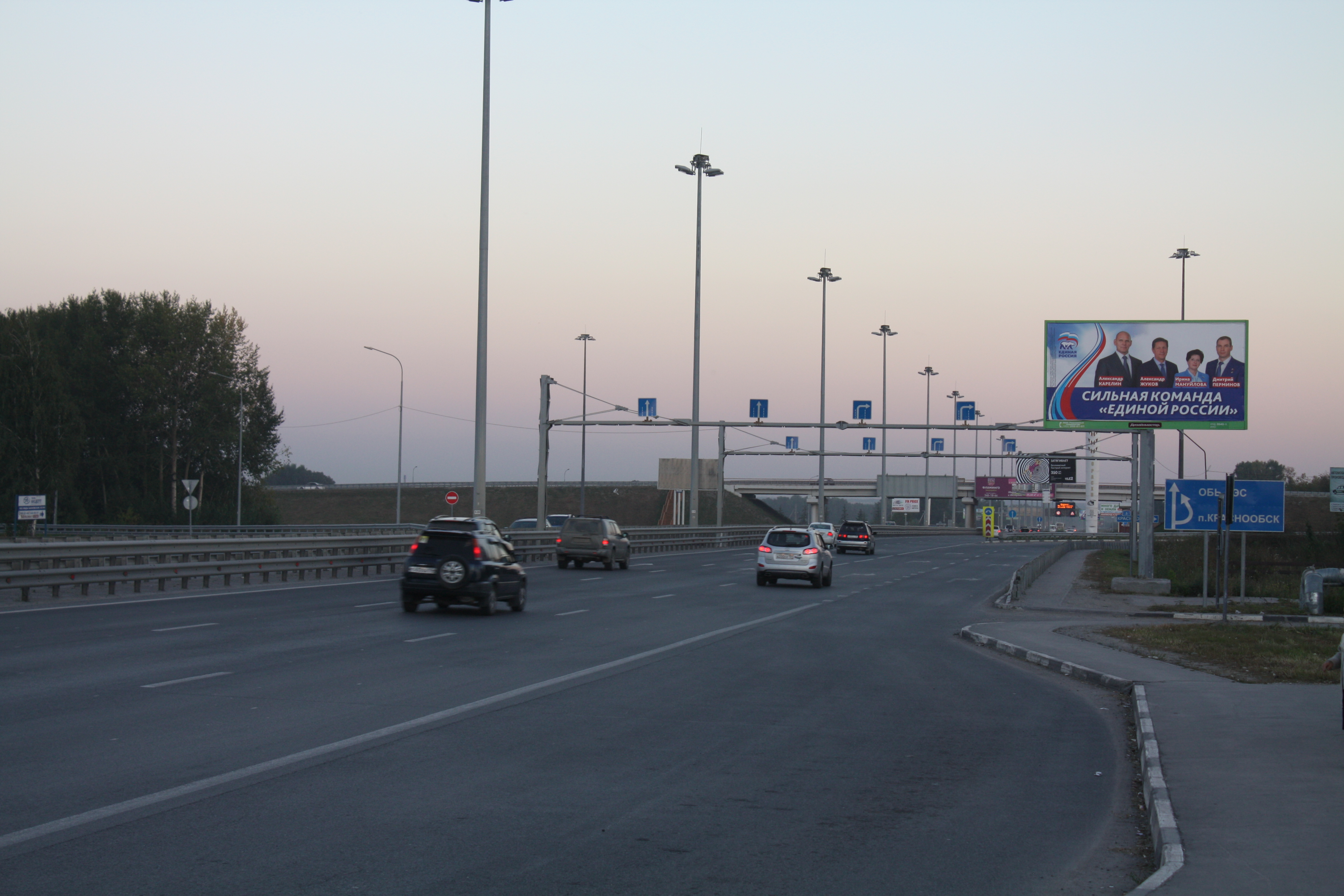
- Native name: Советское шоссе (Russian)
- Length: 9.5 km (5.9 mi)
- Location: Novosibirsk; Russia

Sovetskoye Highway (Russian: Советское шоссе) is a street in Novosibirsk and its suburbs. It connects the Kirovsky and Sovetsky districts of the city, Krasnoobsk and some other settlements. Its length is 9.5 km (5.9 mi).

The highway starts from Zatulinsky Microdistrict, runs through Novosibirsky District and ends at the intersection of Primorskaya, Chasovaya and Ivlev streets of ObGES Microdistrict.

== History ==
From 2008 to 2015, the highway was reconstructed.

== Gallery ==
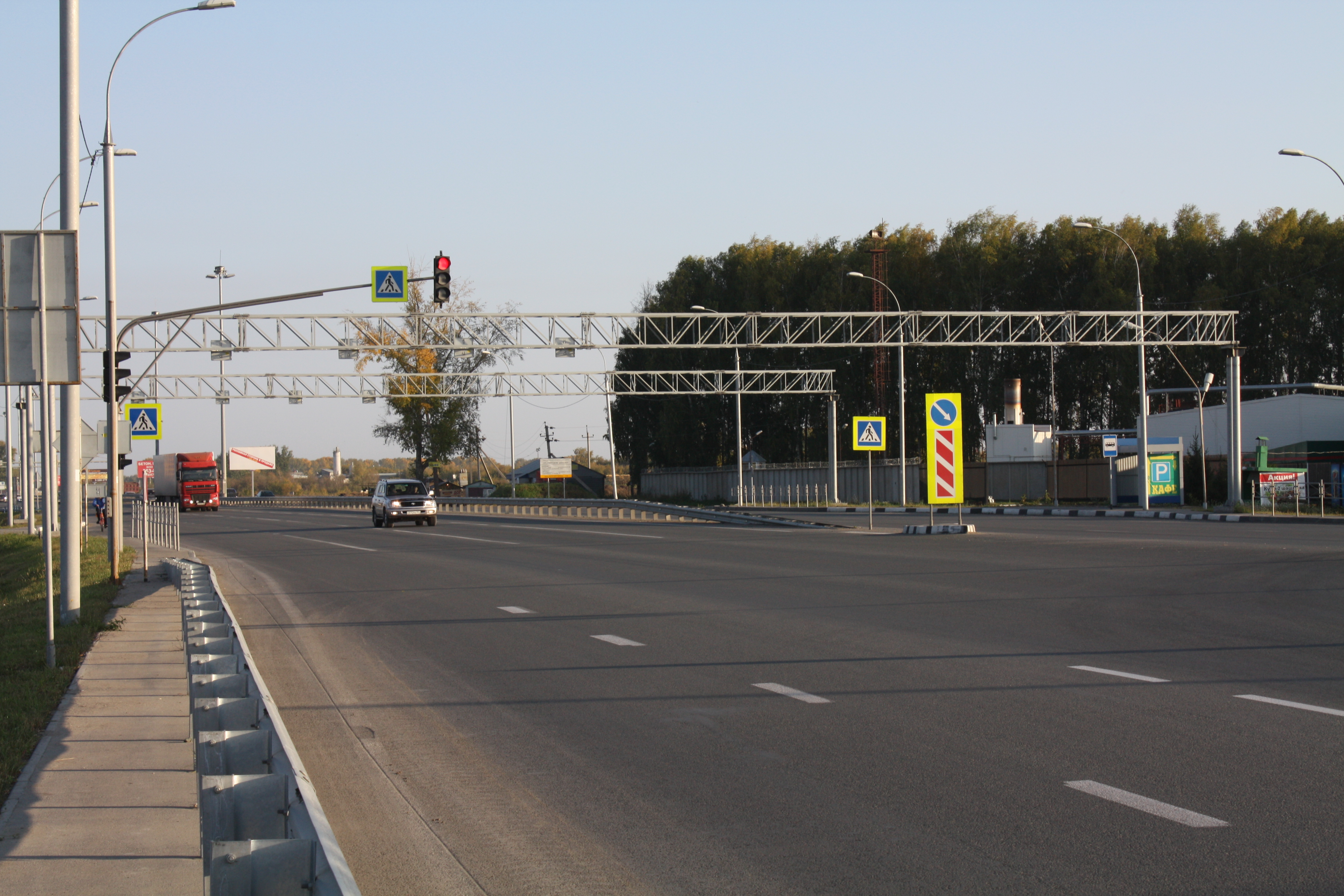

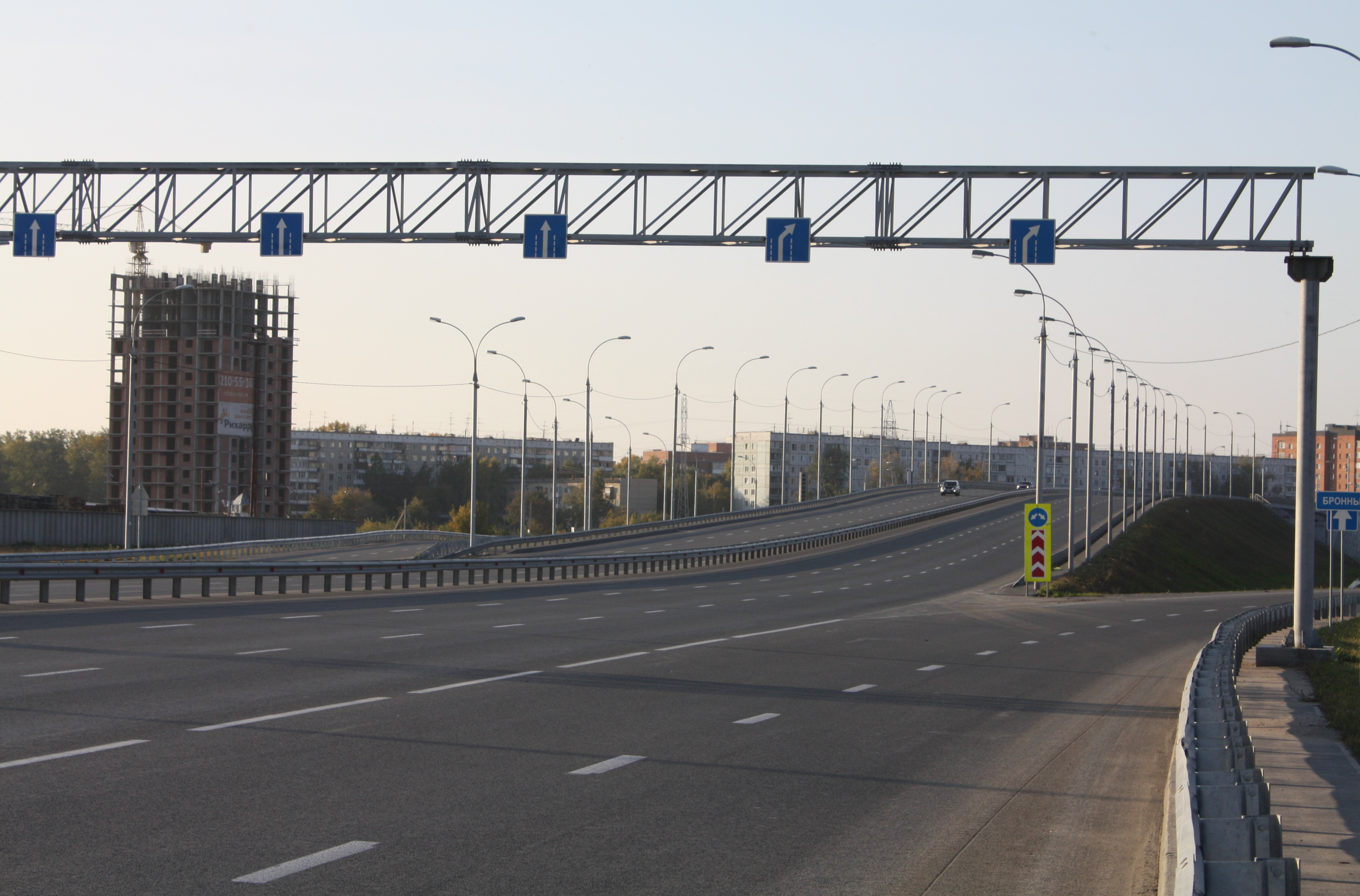

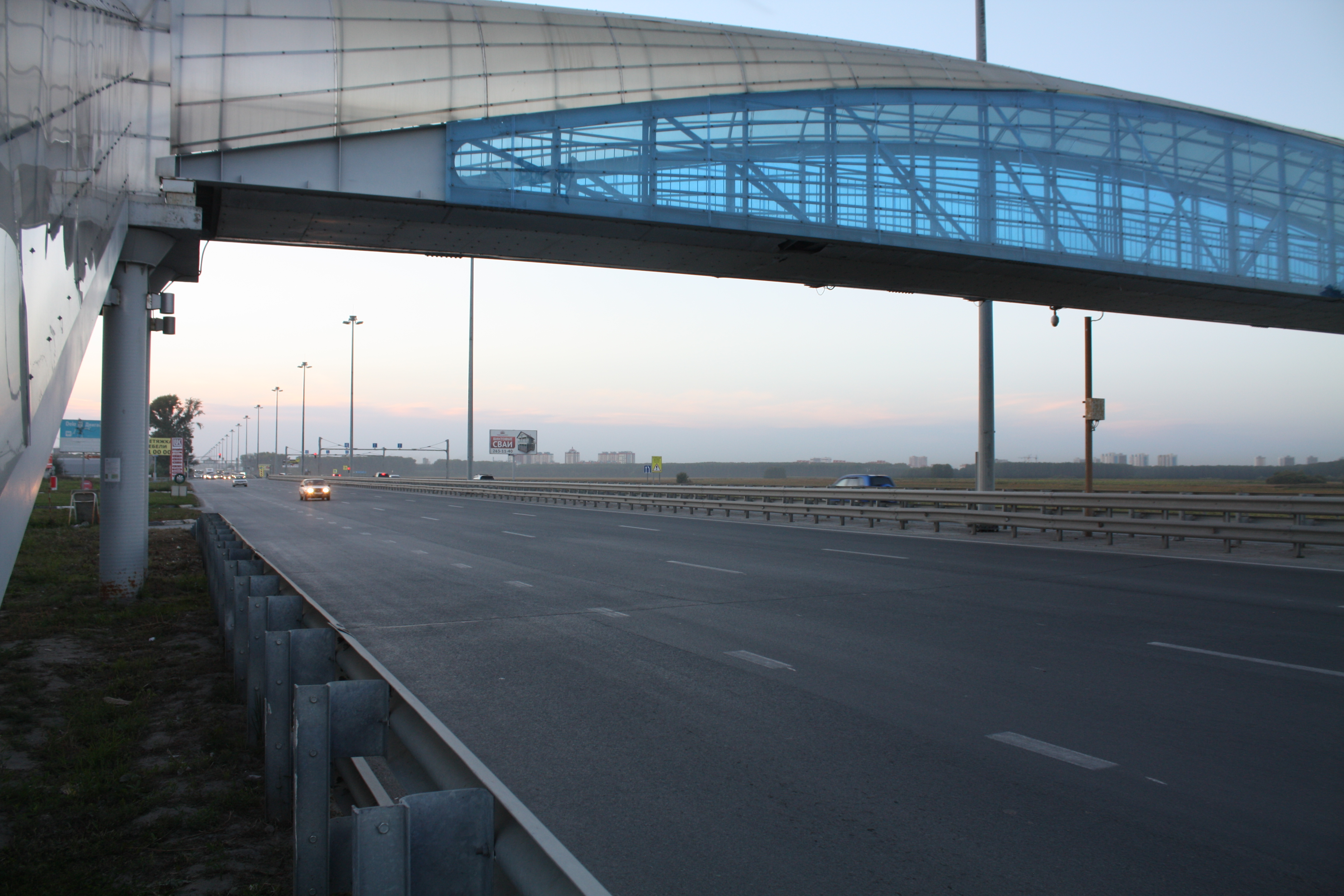

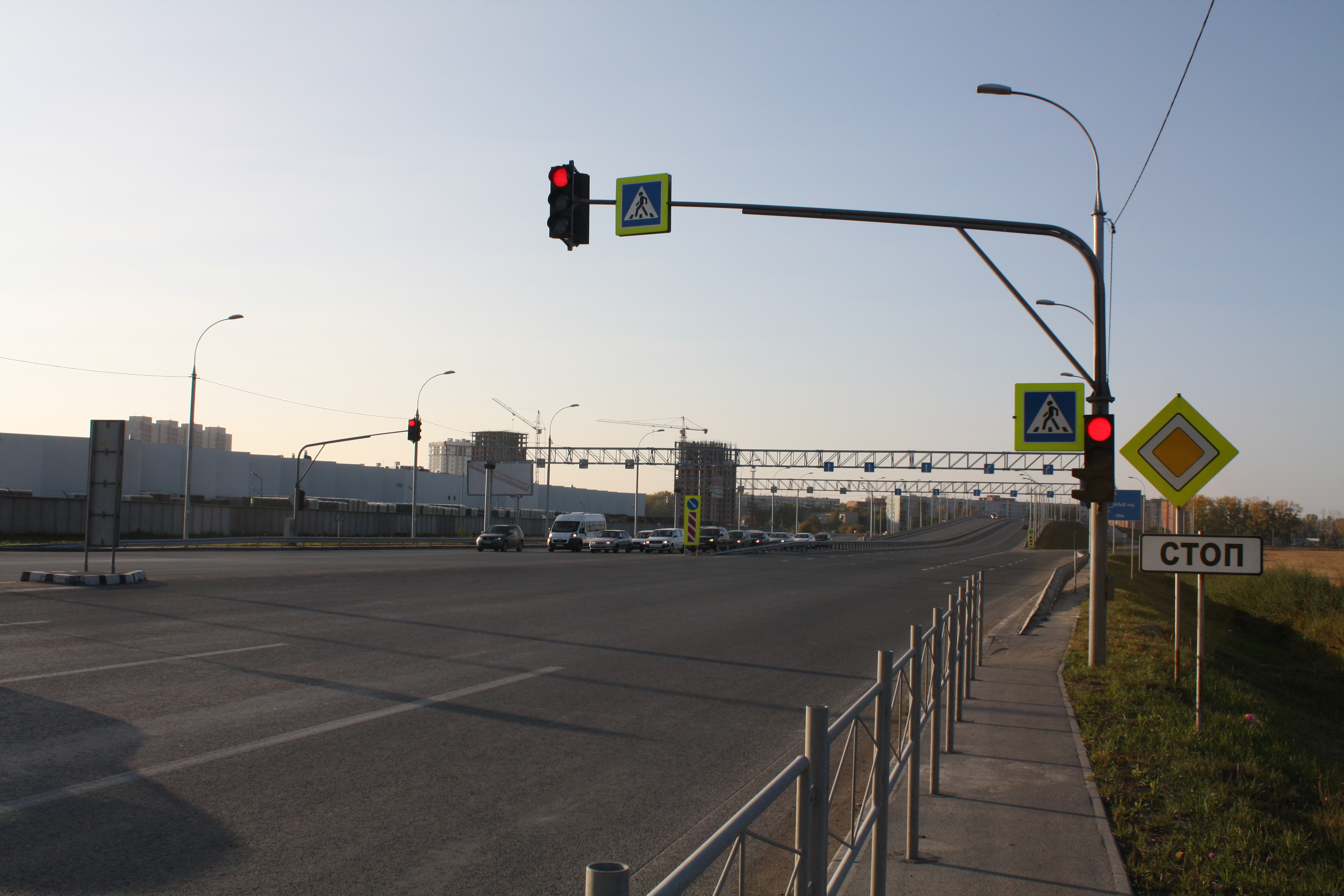

== See also ==
- Berdskoye Highway
