= Alexandr Shiplyuk =

Russian scientist

Alexandr Nikolayevich Shiplyuk (Russian: Александр Николаевич Шиплюк) is a Russian scientist, Doctor of Physical and Mathematical Sciences, corresponding member of the Russian Academy of Sciences, a specialist in the field of gas dynamics. According to Kommersant, he is an expert of the scientific and technical council of the military-industrial commission, the Section of Hypersonic Weapons under the Government of the Russian Federation.

== Biography ==
Alexandr Shiplyuk was born on September 8, 1966, in Barabinsk, Novosibirsk Oblast. He graduated from middle school No. 93 in his hometown.

In 1990, Shiplyuk graduated from the Novosibirsk Electrotechnical Institute (NETI) with a degree hydroaerodynamics and received the qualification of an aerohydromechanical engineer.

Since 1990, he has worked at the Khristianovich Institute of Theoretical and Applied Mechanics (ITAM) as a trainee researcher, junior researcher, researcher, senior researcher, leading researcher, head of the laboratory of hypersonic technologies, deputy director of the institute.

In 2005, Shiplyuk defended his doctoral dissertation on the subject Development of Disturbances and Control of Boundary Layers at Hypersonic Velocities (Развитие возмущений и управление пограничными слоями при гиперзвуковых скоростях).

Since 2007, he has been delivering the following lectures at the Department of Aerohydrodynamics of the Novosibirsk State Technical University: Methods of Aerophysical Experiment (annual course), semester courses of lectures Methods of Optimization in Problems of Ballistics and Aerodynamics and Modern Problems of Ballistics and Hydroaerodynamics.

In 2012, he was elected a corresponding member of the Russian Academy of Sciences in the Department of Energy, Mechanical Engineering, Mechanics and Control Processes.

In 2015, he became the director of ITAM.

Kommersant and TASS report that the scientist is the head of Laboratory No.5 called The Hypersonic Technologies (Гиперзвуковые технологии). However, according to the ITAM website, the laboratory is called The Aerogasdynamics of High Velocities (Аэрогазодинамика больших скоростей), and the institute’s website also indicates that the scientist became its head in 2006.

=== Suspicion of state treason and arrest ===
On August 5, 2022, TASS reported that the scientist was arrested in a case of state treason, and the news agency also mentioned that the Institute of Theoretical and Applied Mechanics was searched. Reuters reported that Russia accused Shiplyuk for passing classified material at a scientific conference in China in 2017 as reason for the arrest. Shiplyuk claims that the classified material was freely accessible on the Internet.

== Scientific activity ==
The main scientific activity of Shiplyuk is the development of the experimental base and methods of aerophysical research, as well as the experimental aerothermodynamics of hypersonic aircraft with ramjet engines.

Among the developments of the scientist are the modernization and creation of equipment for ground tests, methods for modeling wave processes in hypersonic shear flows; revealing nonlinear mechanisms of laminar-turbulent transition in hypersonic boundary layers; experimental discovery of a new method for stabilizing hypersonic boundary layers using coatings with a porous microstructure that absorb ultrasound; creation of a new type of thermoanemometric sensor with a sensitive element in the form of a semiconductor single-crystal micro- or nanotube.

== Awards ==
Alexandr Shiplyuk was awarded the Academician Struminsky Prize for works in the field of aerodynamics among young scientists of the SB RAS, he is also the winner of the youth competition of scientific works of the Novosibirsk Scientific Center of the Siberian Branch of the RAS, dedicated to the 275th anniversary of the RAS.

== See also ==
- Valentin Danilov
- Dmitry Kolker
- Anatoly Maslov
