= Berdskoye Highway =

Street in Novosibirsk, Russia

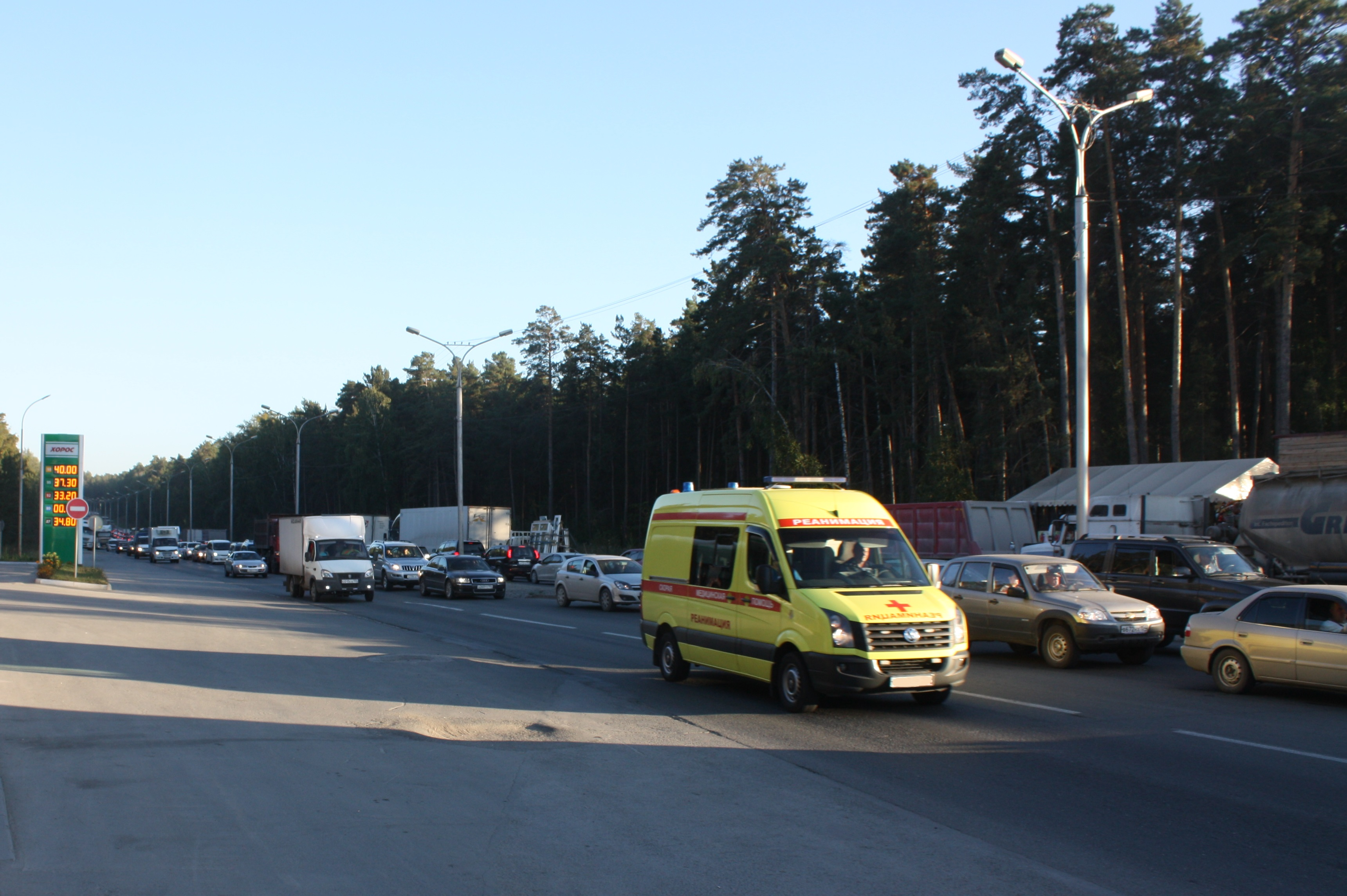
- Native name: Бердское шоссе (Russian)
- Length: 20.4 km (12.7 mi)
- Location: Novosibirsk; Russia

Berdskoye Highway (Russian: Бердское шоссе) is a street connecting Novosibirsk and Berdsk. It starts from the bridge across the Inya River, runs south through Pervomaisky and Sovetsky districts of Novosibirsk, then crosses the Berd Bay and ends at the intersection of Pervomaiskaya and Vokzalnaya streets of Berdsk.

Berdskoye Highway is a part of Federal Highway R256.

According to a Yandex study (2017), it is the third-longest street in Russia. Its length is 20.4 km (12.7 mi).

== History ==
Construction of the highway began in 1930. The head of the road works was Nikolai Vekshin.

In 1932, road works were almost completed.

== Gallery ==
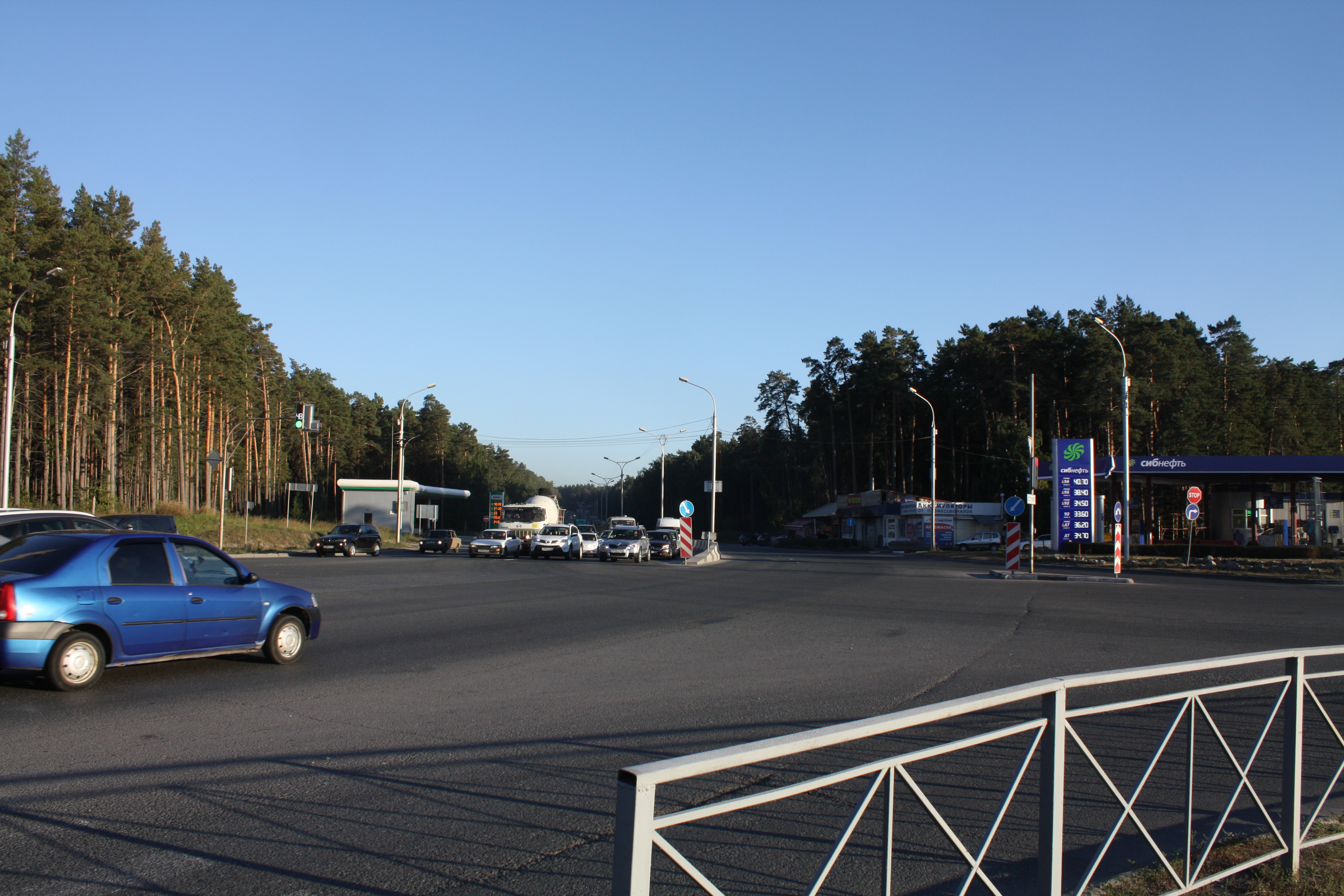

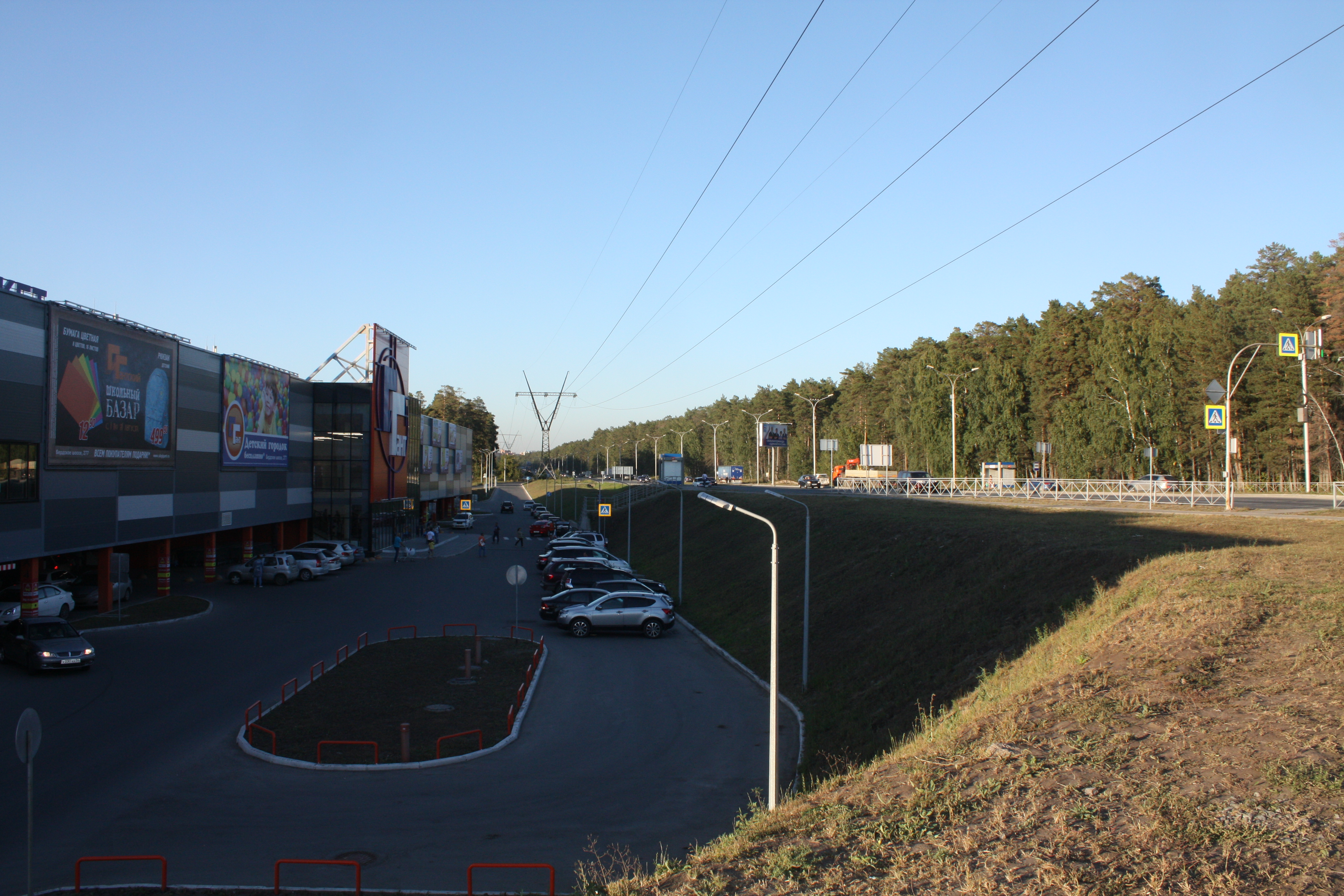

== Attractions ==
- Novosibirsk Museum of Railway Engineering
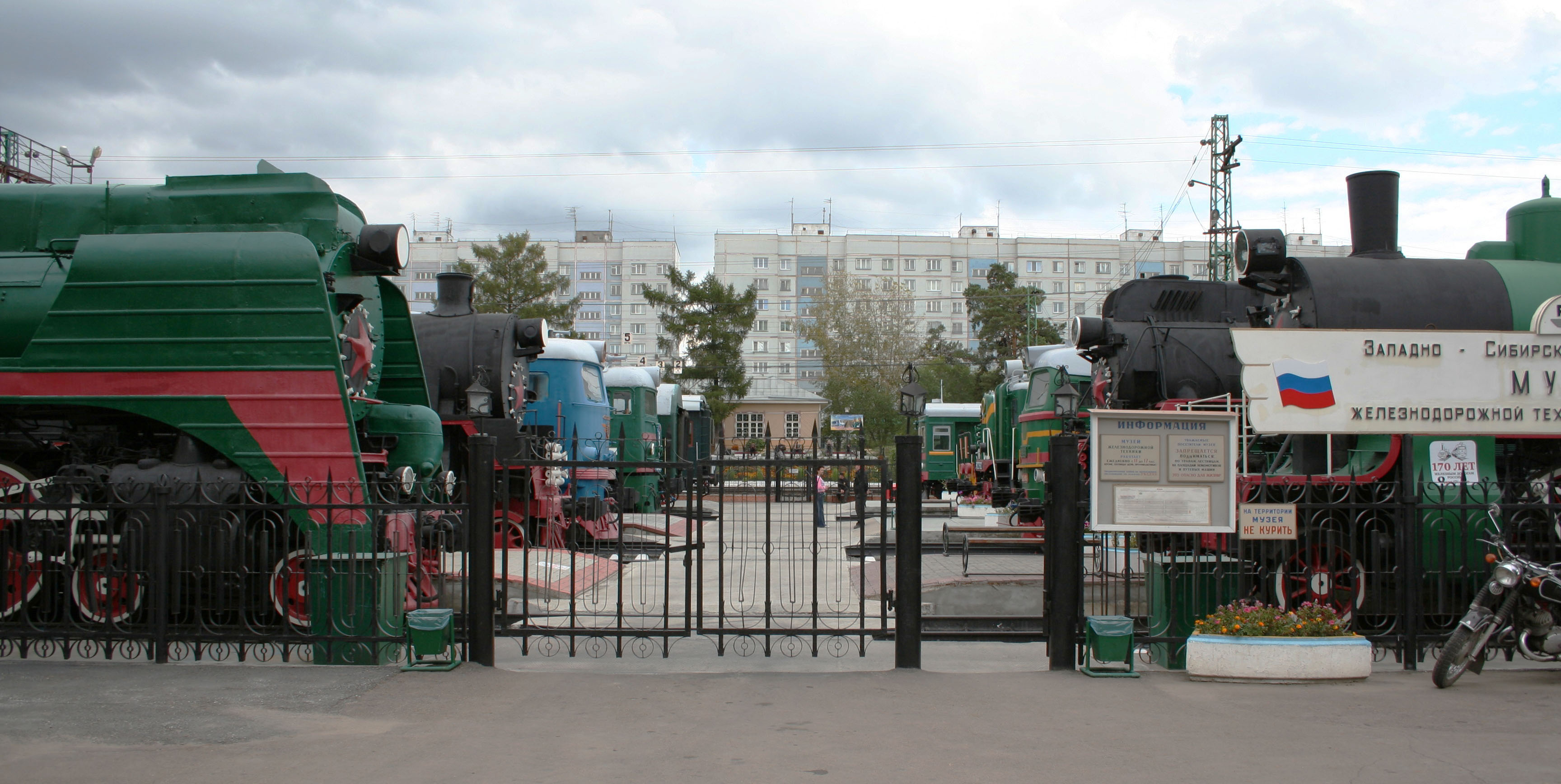
Novosibirsk Museum of Railway Engineering

== See also ==
- Sovetskoye Highway
