= Novosibirsk Shipping Canal =

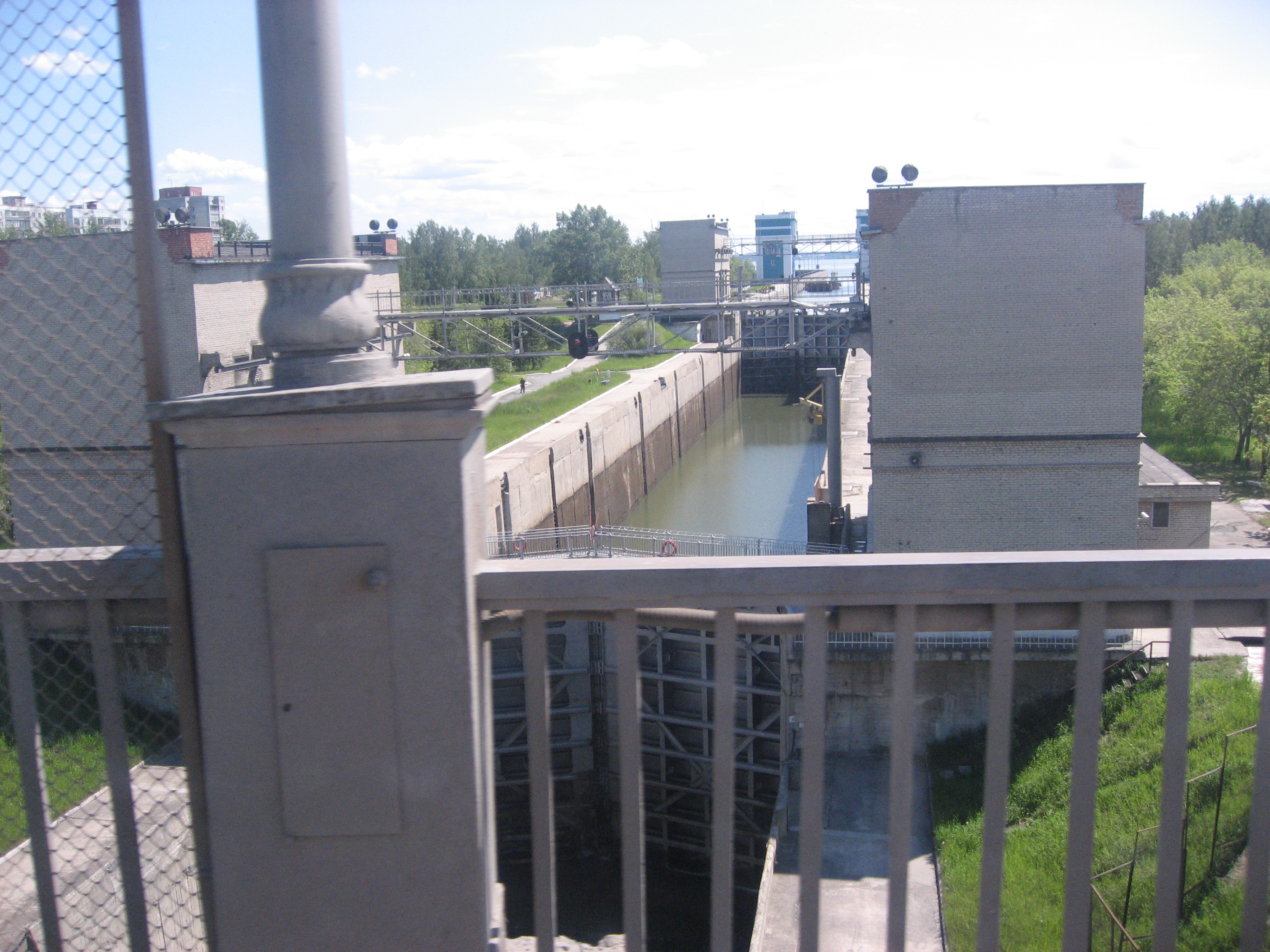

Specifications
- Status: Operated

Novosibirsk Shipping Canal (Russian: Новосибирский судоходный канал) is the canal located in Novosibirsk that connects the Novosibirsk Reservoir and the Ob downstream of the Novosibirsk Hydroelectric Station dam. The canal became operational simultaneously with the commissioning of the Novosibirsk Hydroelectric Station.

== Overview ==
The canal is located in Sovetsky District of Novosibirsk along its entire length. The banks of the upper part of the canal are lined with concrete. The dachas of Novosibirsk residents and swamp forests are located along the canal; The Nizhnyaya Yeltsovka River flows into the canal near its confluence with the Ob.

== Locks ==
The canal is equipped with a single triple-chamber shipping lock. The length of each chamber is 148 meters, the width is 18 meters, the maximum depth is 6,2 meters, the minimum depth is 2,5 meters. The time of filling and emptying of chamber is 8 minutes. A dual-lane road bridge runs over the lock. Only ships, which dimensions do not exceed 130 meters in length, 17,2 meters in width, 12 meters in air draught, are allowed to sluicing. The minimum acceptable level of water under the keel is 0,25 meters, the minimum acceptable reserve in width of lock's chamber is 0,8 meters. Small vessels are allowed to sluicing in daytime only. Inflatable boats, rowing vessels and sailing ships having no engines, as well as all water scooters, are allowed to sluicing only with towing vessel; a towing should be carried out using side-by-side method; crew and passengers of a towed craft must be on the board of a towing craft.

The reconstruction of the canal's locks began in 2017 and finished in 2020.
