= Vladimir Aniskin =

Russian sculptor

- Born: 15 December 1973; Novosibirsk, Soviet Union
- Known for: Miniature sculpture
- Awards: Guinness World Record

Vladimir Aniskin (born 15 December 1973) is a Russian miniature sculptor and Senior Researcher at the ITAM SB RAS, Guinness World Record Holder.

== Biography ==
Vladimir Aniskin was born in Novosibirsk in 1973.

He graduated from Novosibirsk State University with a red diploma.

Since 1999, Vladimir Aniskin became an employee of the Institute of Theoretical and Applied Mechanics of the SB RAS (ITAM SB RAS).

In 2004, he defended his Ph.D. dissertation. In 2013, scientist defended his doctoral dissertation.

== Artworks ==
The artist has been interested in microminiature since 1998. In 2006, he created a New Year tree with a height of 550 microns, placing it on a cut of poppy seeds; in 2009, Aniskin made a composition "Yolka", consisting of a New Year tree with a height of 160 microns, a snowman (80 microns) and Christmas tree decorations with a diameter of 10 microns. Among his miniature works are "Shod flea", "Camels in the eye of a needle", "The smallest book in the world", etc.

=== Guinness World Record ===
A miniature copy of the Soviet Seyatel Coin was entered in the Guinness Book of Records as the world's smallest copy of the coin. Its size is 3.13 mm, weight is 0.018 g.

== Family ==
Vladimir Aniskin is married to Svetlana and has three sons, Matvei, Fyodor and Vladimir.
