= Novosibirsk Crematorium =

- Новосибирский крематорий
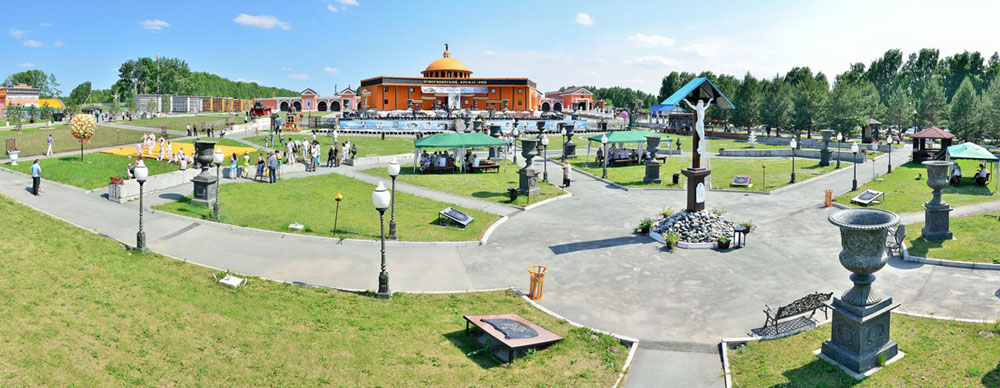
- Interactive map of the Novosibirsk Crematorium area

General information
- Location: near Novosibirsk, Russia
- Completed: 2003

Novosibirsk Crematorium (Russian: Новосибирский крематорий) is a funerary establishment located in the eastern suburb of Novosibirsk, Russia. One of the two crematoriums of the city. It was created by businessman Sergey Yakushin. The crematory was opened in 2003.

The first private crematorium in Russia.

== History ==
The crematorium opened in the summer of 2003.

On July 26, 2010, the virtual funeral was held in the crematorium, farewell ceremony to honor Stanislav Janusz Kolodejczyk, a famous Polish traveler who died while traveling along the Trans-Siberian Railway. An online funeral was organized for his relatives living in Poland and USA. Catholic priest Johann Cann performed the funeral rite in Polish. The ceremony was accompanied by chants of nuns from Poland. It was the first virtual burial ceremony in Russia.

== Description ==
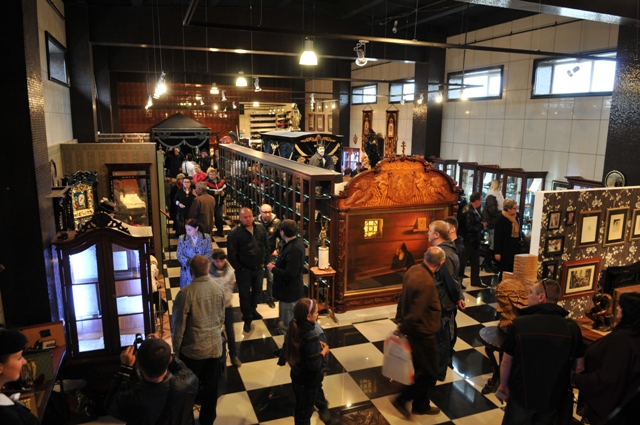
Museum of World Funeral Culture.

Alleys, sculptures, gazebos and other objects are located near the crematorium.

Several animal species inhabit here: Mongolian camel and squirrels.

The Museum of World Funeral Culture is located here. it is a member of the International Federation of Thanatologists Associations.

Two halls for a farewell ceremony, a room for dead bodies, an embalming room, a room with cremation equipment are located in the crematorium.

== Farewell ceremony ==
It is possible to observe the process of burning the body, or leave before the moment of cremation. At the same time, the viewing room and the hall with stoves are specially separated from each other by bulletproof glass, because there is a danger of aberrant behavior of people in a state of severe psychological shock.
