= Pilot Plant, Novosibirsk =

Experimental Plant
- Founded: 1959
- Headquarters: Novosibirsk, Russia
- Products: equipment for scientific research, seismic instruments, vibrographs, electronic equipment, etc.

The Pilot Plant (Russian: Опытный завод) is a plant in ObGES Microdistrict of Novosibirsk, Russia. It was founded in 1959. It produces equipment for scientific research, seismic instruments, and electronic equipment, and became a branch of the Institute of Theoretical and Applied Mechanics in 2005.

== History ==
The plant began operating in November 1959, 32 people worked at the enterprise at that time.

In 1960, the plant employed 496 people, in 1964, the number of employees reached 995.

In 1967, the plant made a profit of 3.5 million rubles and fulfilled 650 orders.

In 1969, the enterprise employed 1062 workers.

In the early 1970s, the plant began to work for the Institute of Hydrodynamics and receives copyright certificates for several types of devices, it produces printed circuit boards, magnetic heads for computers, mass spectrometers, seismic stations ("Taiga") in the same period.

In 1979, Gosstandard of the USSR has approved CAMAC-standard, and the plant began to produce systems based on this standard.

In the 1980s, the plant employed over 1,500 workers.

In 1992, the enterprise had difficulty, the production of high vacuum equipment was suspended, many highly qualified workers resigned from the plant.

In 1997, production began to recover; the plant manufactures ultra-high-vacuum simulators of outer space and equipment for laser cleaning of substances for the Rzhanov Institute of Semiconductor Physics and speed portable field gas chromatographs ("ECHO") according to the project of the Special Design Technological Bureau of Environmental Instrumentation.

In December 2005, it became a branch of the Institute of Theoretical and Applied Mechanics.

== Products ==
Various equipment for scientific research and household use, electromagnets with high field strengths, capacitors with a large electrical capacity, vibrographs of horizontal and vertical vibrations, seismic devices, radio and electronic equipment.
