= Valery Golubkin =

Russian physicist

Valery Nikolaevich Golubkin (born 1952) is a Russian physicist and former professor at the Moscow Institute of Physics and Technology. Golubkin worked at the department of theoretical and applied aerohydromechanics and is an expert for hypersonic technology. In April 2020 he was arrested on the suspicion of treason. He is accused of passing state secrets to an unnamed NATO country. His lawyer said that at the time Golubkin denied the charges against him. On the 26th of June in 2023 he was sentenced to 12 years in prison.

Golubkin holds the academic degree "Doctor of Technical Sciences" since 1991.
