= Novosibirsk Hydroelectric Station =

Dam in Sovetsky, Novosibirsk, Russia

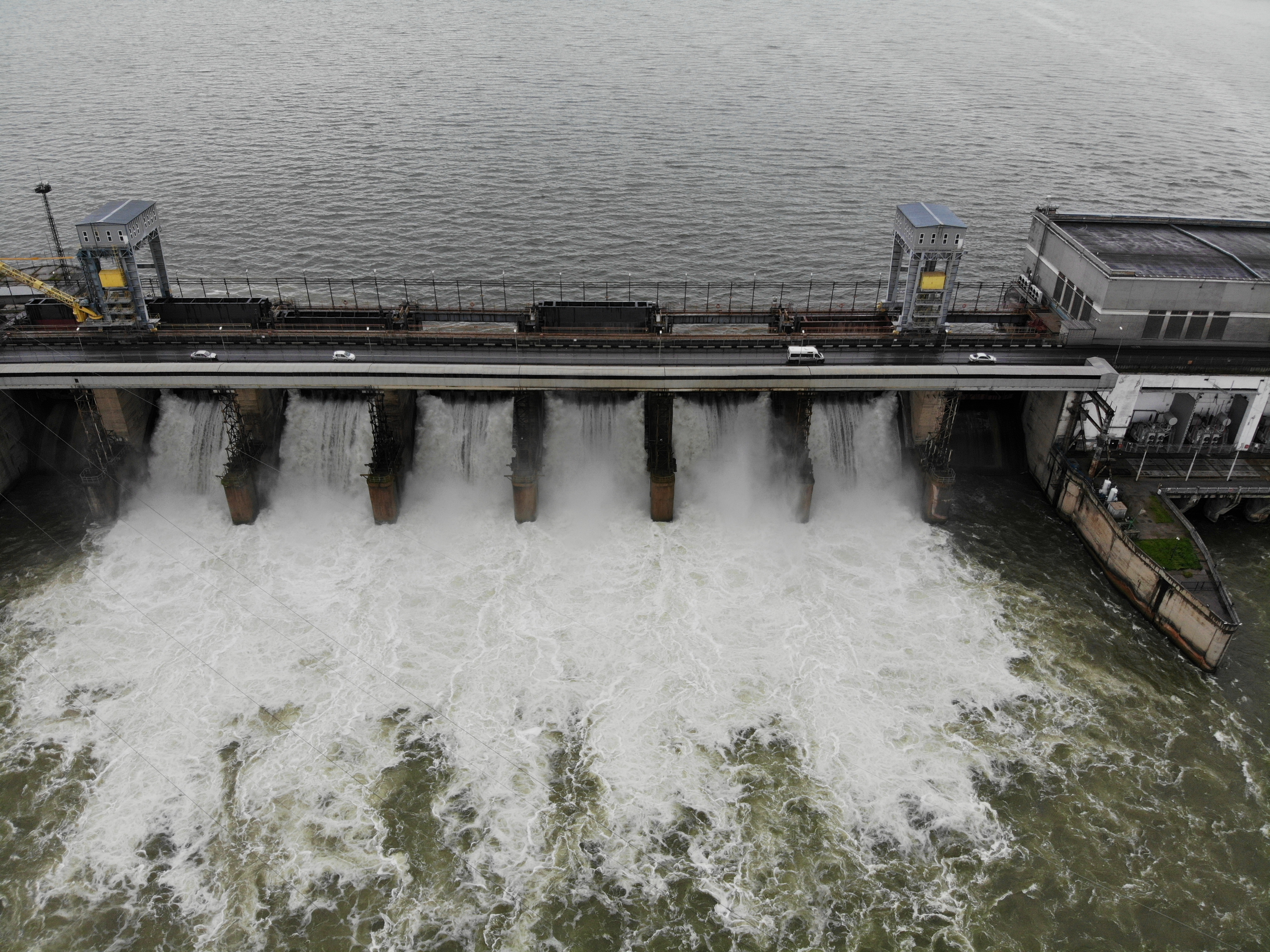
- Interactive map of Novosibirsk Hydroelectric Station
- Official name: Новосибирская ГЭС
- Country: Russian Federation
- Location: Novosibirsk Oblast
- Purpose: Power
- Status: Operational
- Construction began: 1950
- Opening date: 1957

Dam and spillways
- Type of dam: Concrete
- Impounds: Ob River
- Height: 33 m (108 ft)

Reservoir
- Creates: Novosibirsk Reservoir
- Total capacity: 8.8 km^{3}
- Surface area: 1,070 km^{2}
- Maximum length: 200 km (124 mi)
- Maximum width: 17 km (10.5 mi)

Power Station
- Installed capacity: 490 MW

Novosibirsk Hydroelectric Station (Russian: Новосибирская гидроэлектростанция) is a hydroelectric power plant on the Ob River. It is located in Sovetsky City District of Novosibirsk, Russia.

== History ==
Construction began in 1950. The station was separately visited by Nikita Khrushchev and Richard Nixon in 1959.

== Gallery ==
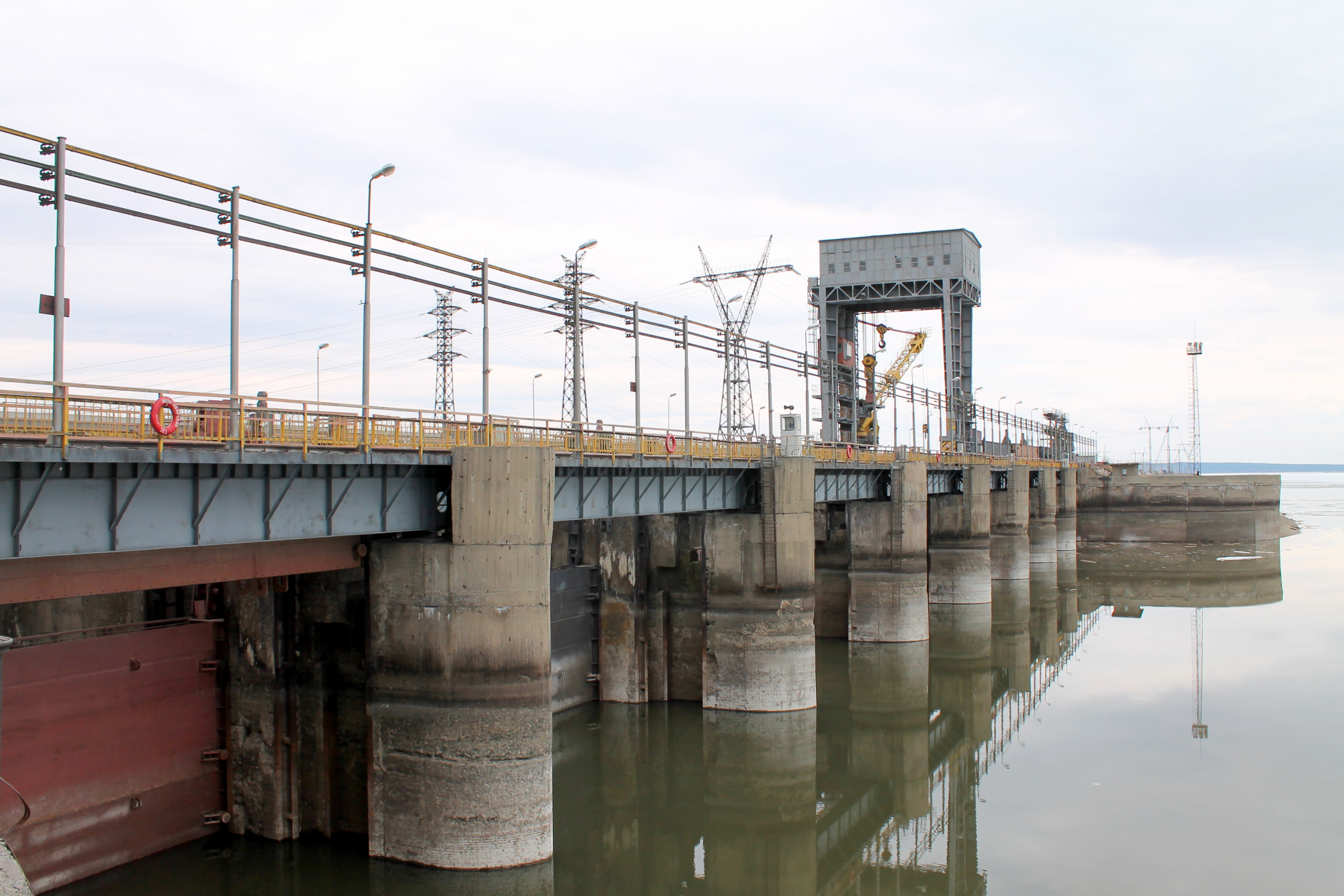

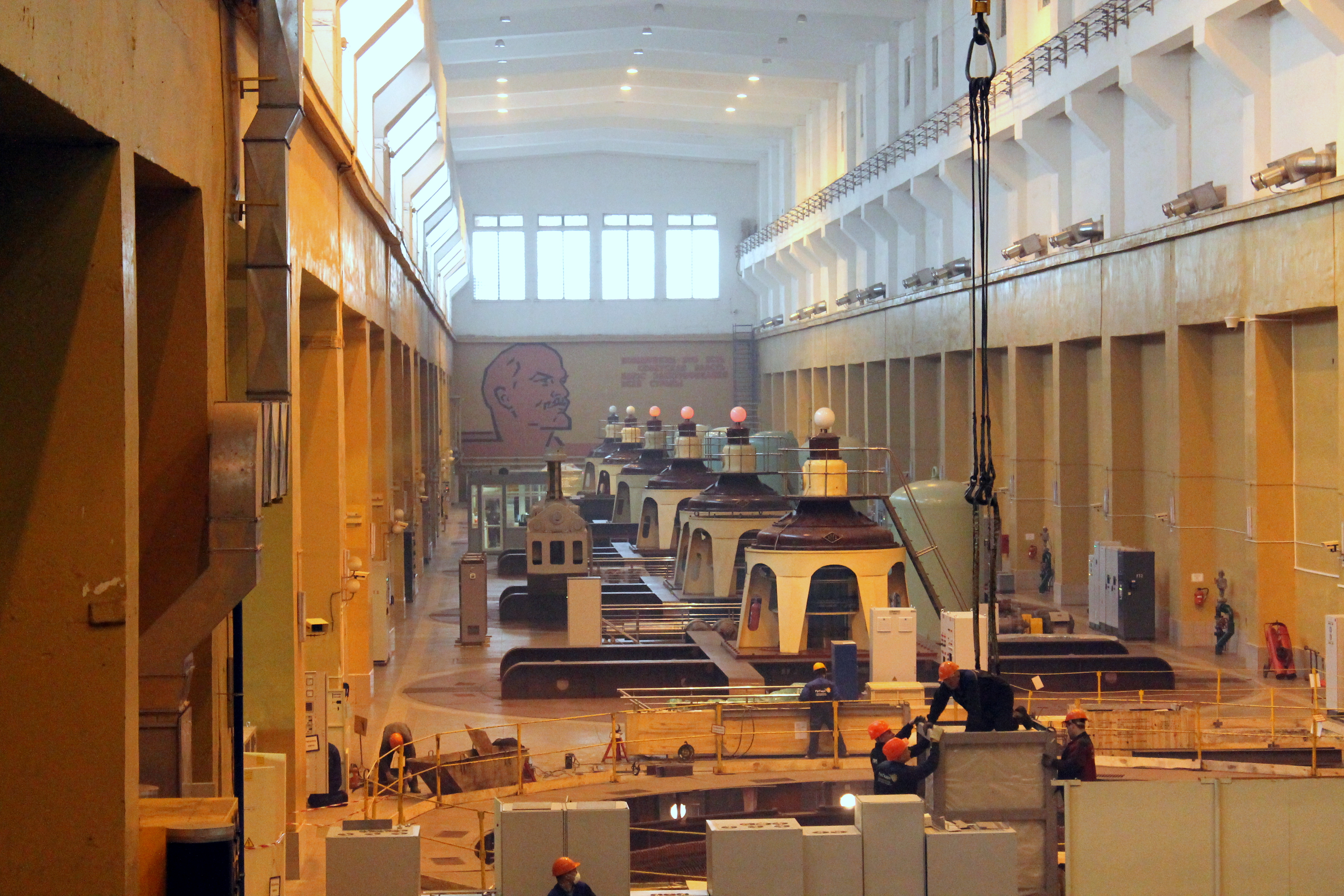

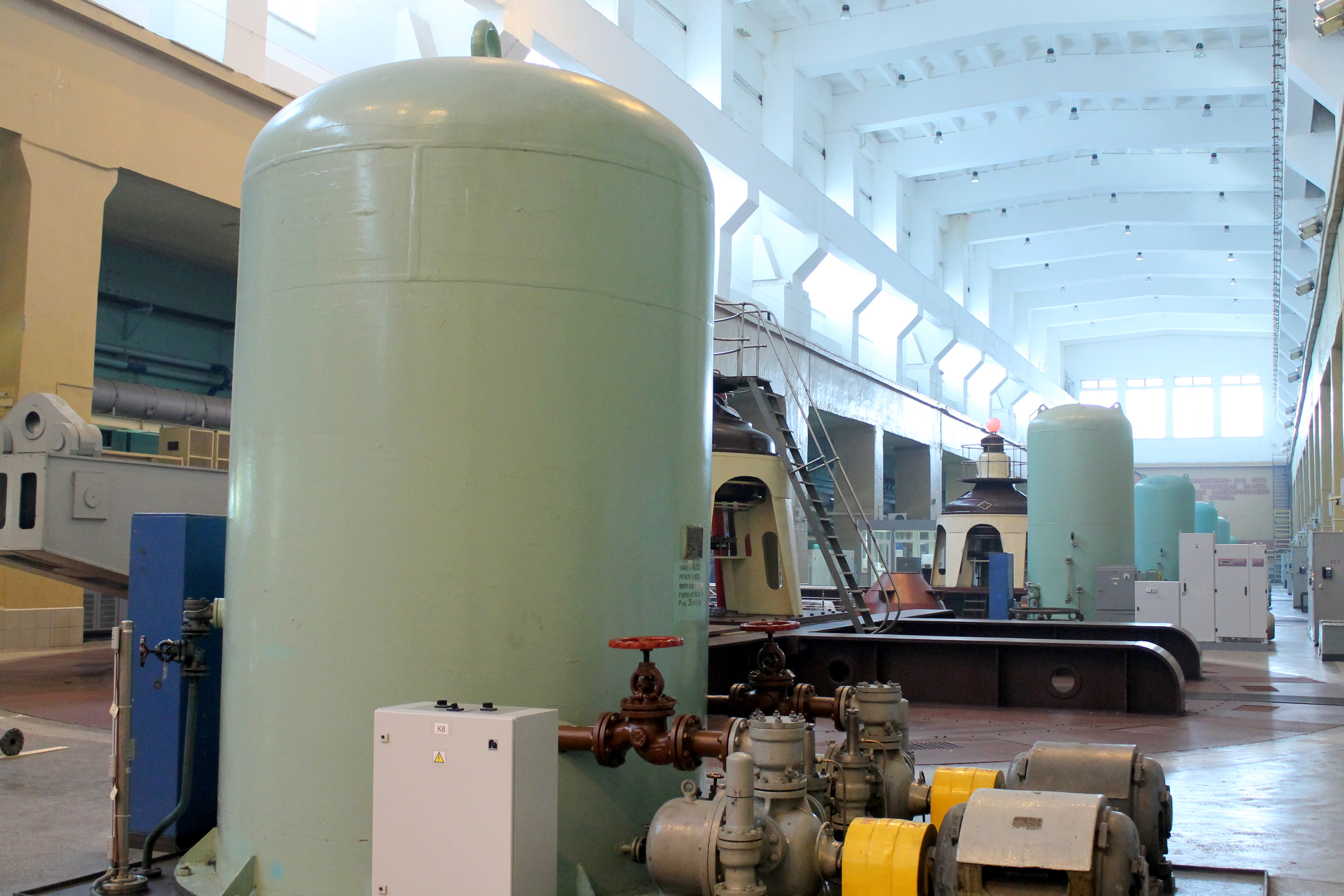

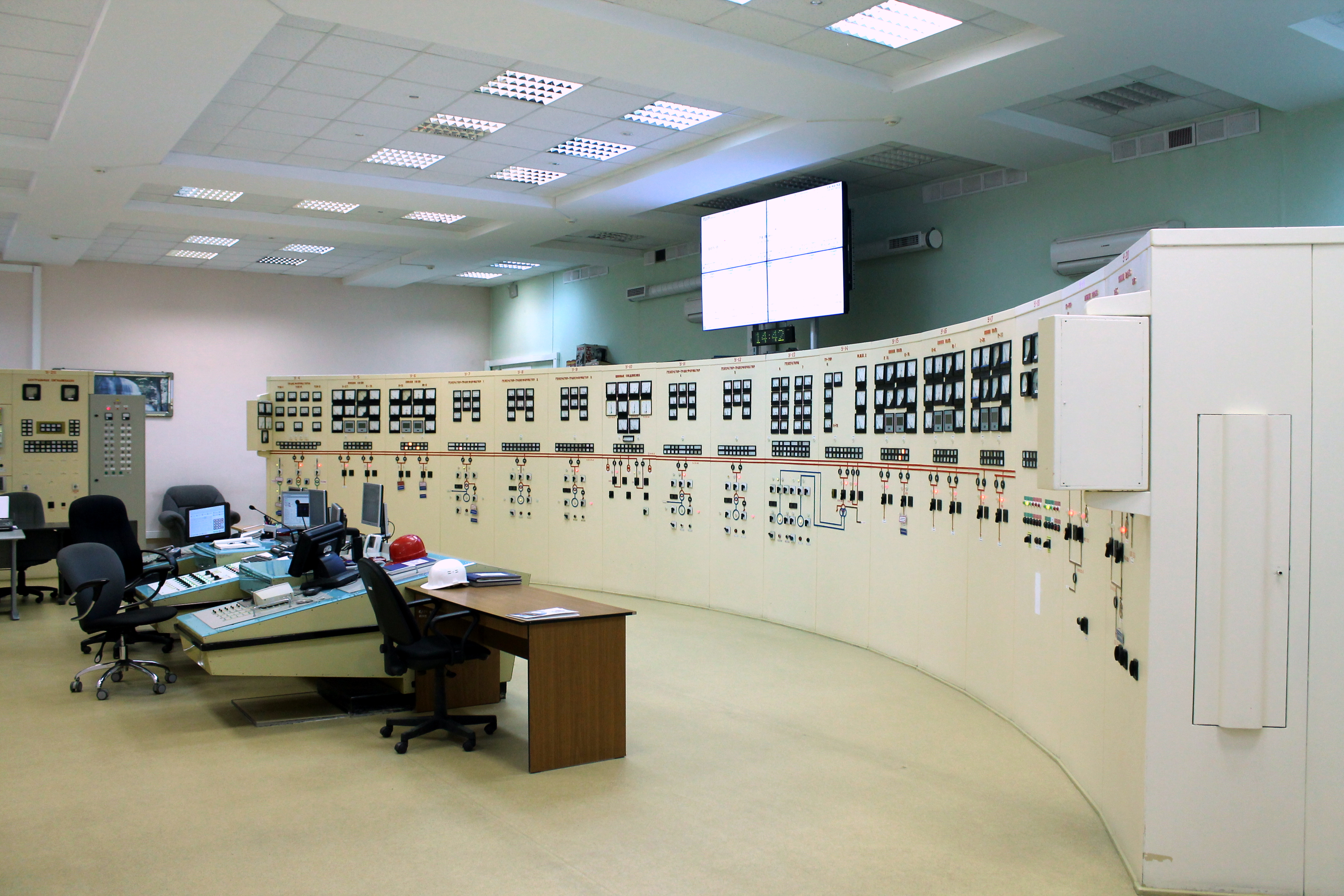

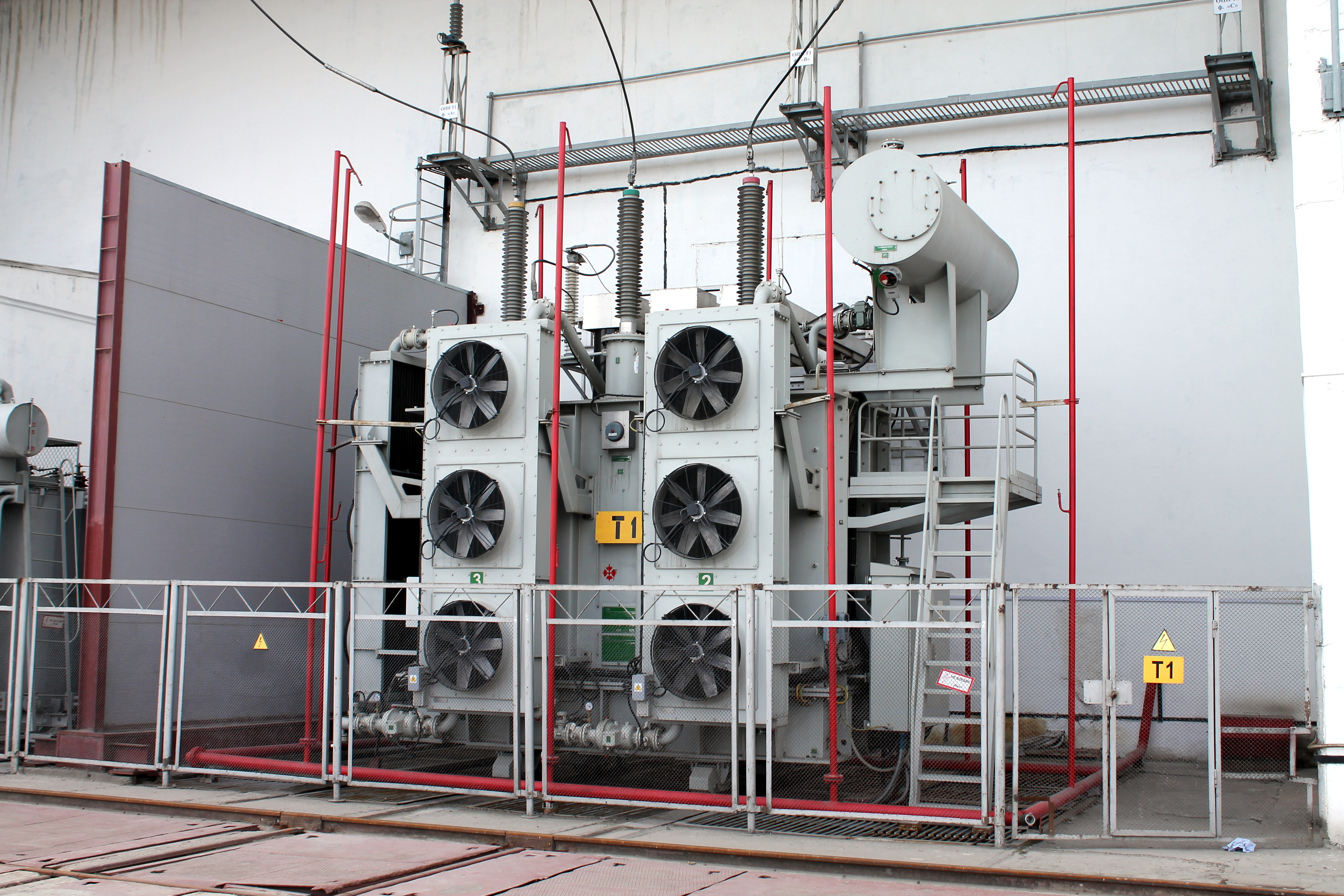

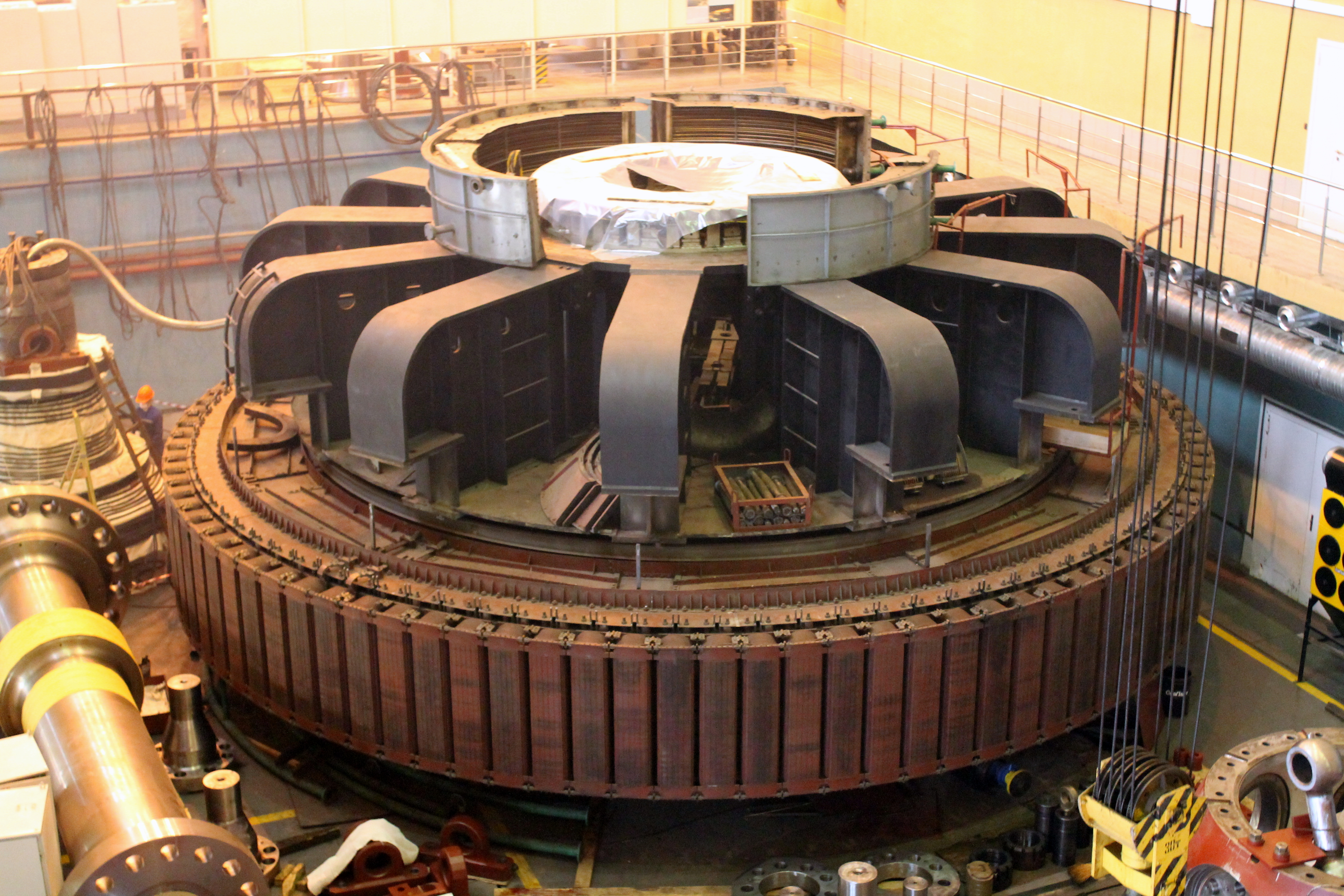

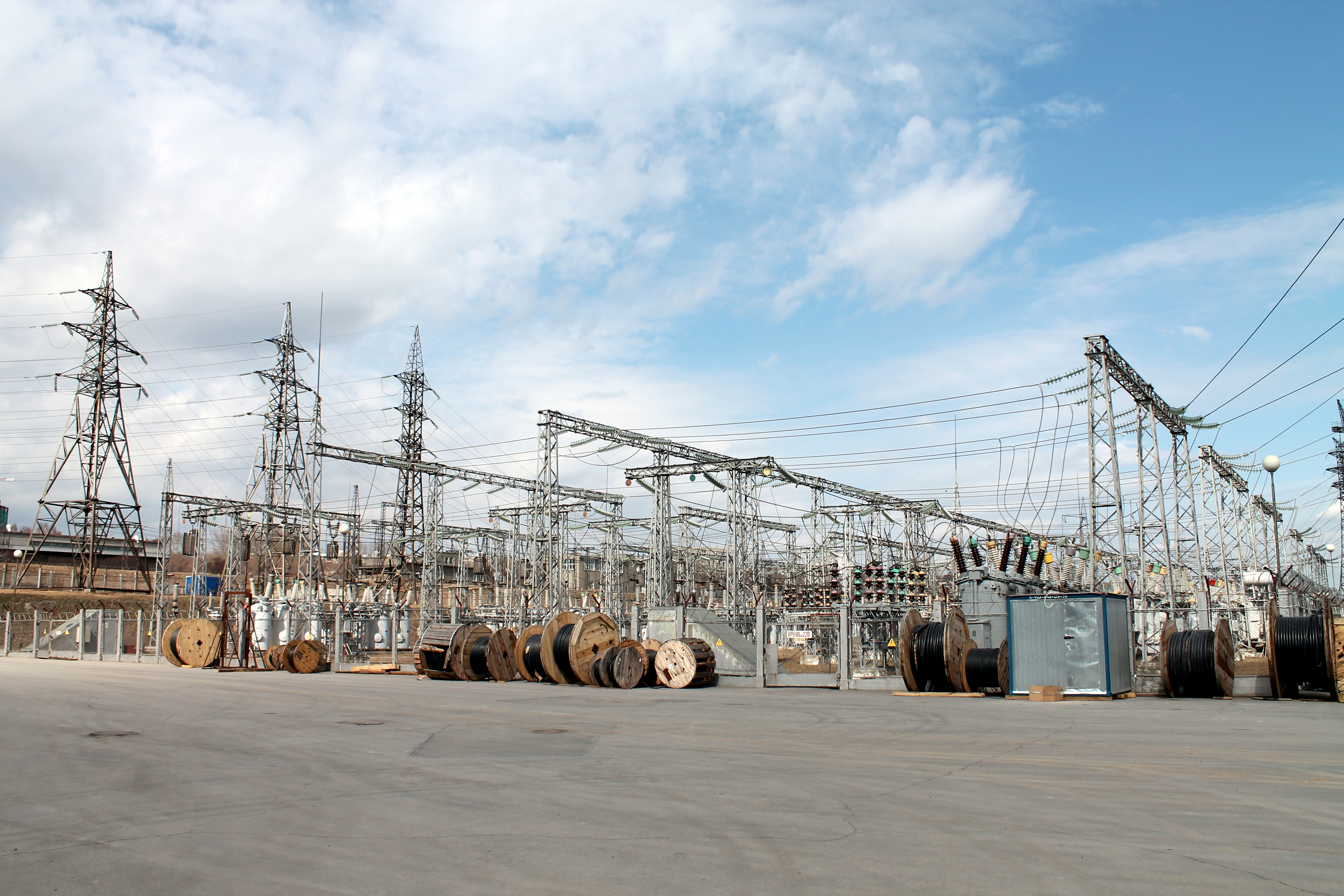

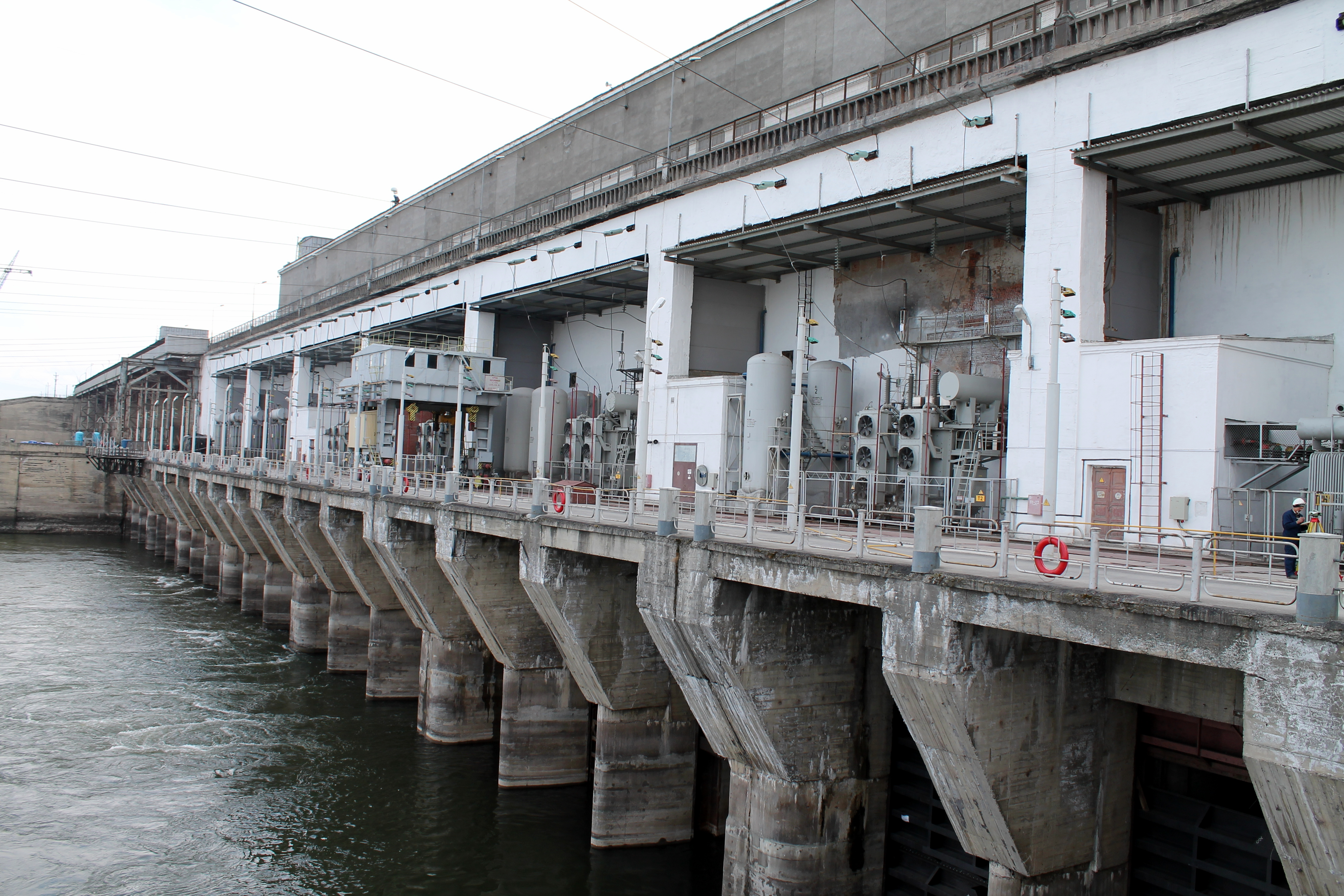

== Shipping Canal ==
The Novosibirsk Shipping Canal is part of the hydroelectric power station.
