= ObGES Microdistrict =

ObGES
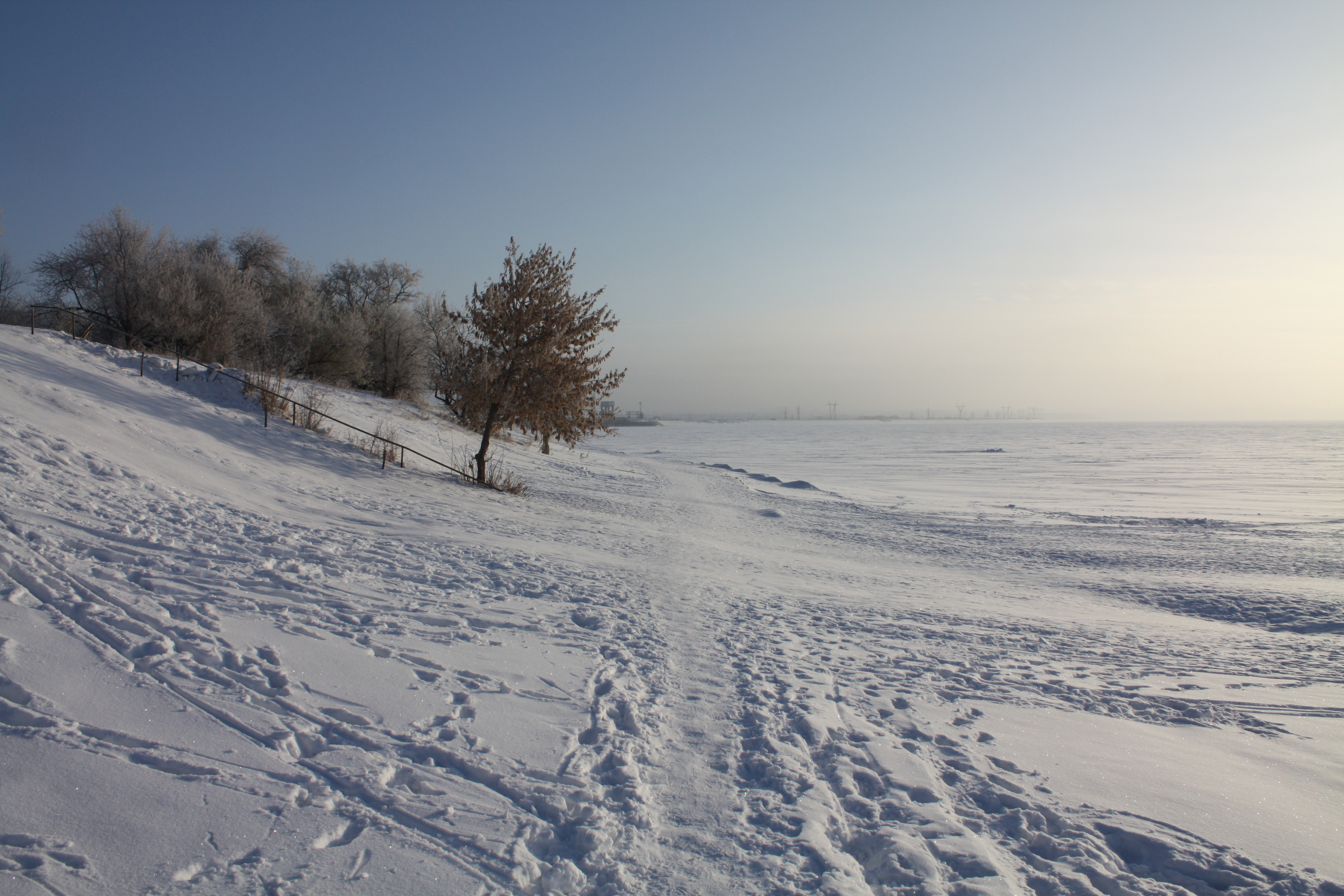
- Interactive map of ObGES
- Country: Russia
- City: Novosibirsk
- District: Sovetsky City District

ObGES is a microdistrict in Sovetsky City District of Novosibirsk, Russia. It is located on the western banks of the Ob River and Novosibirsk Reservoir.

== History ==
The microdistrict originated in the 1950s as a work settlement of the builders of Novosibirsk Hydroelectric Station.

In 1950, the construction of the hydroelectric power began.

In 1958, the district became part of the Sovetsky City District.

In 1959, Nikita Khrushchev visited the hydroelectric power.

July 29, 1959, Richard Nixon visited the hydroelectric power.

== Streets ==
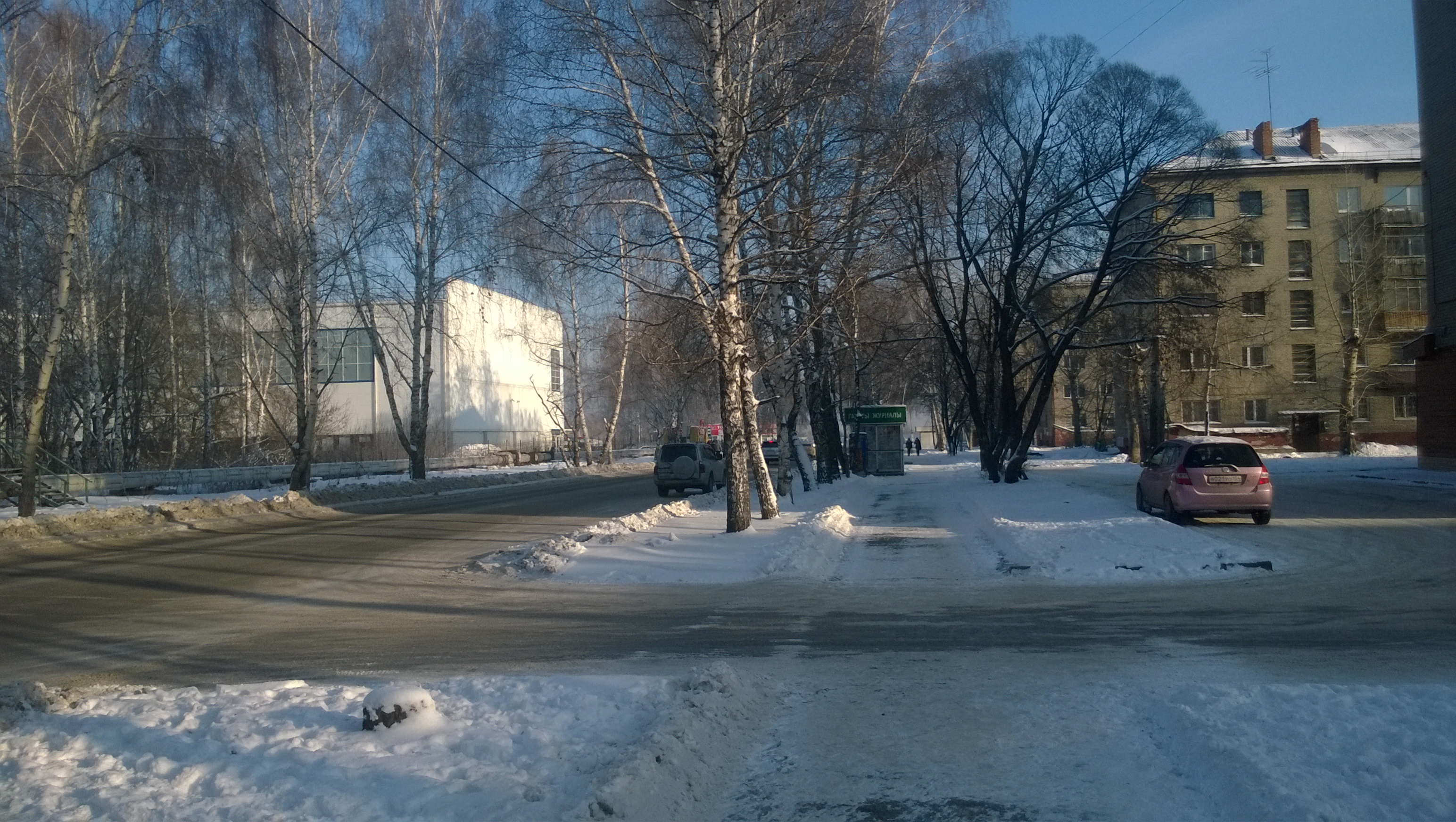
Chasovaya Street

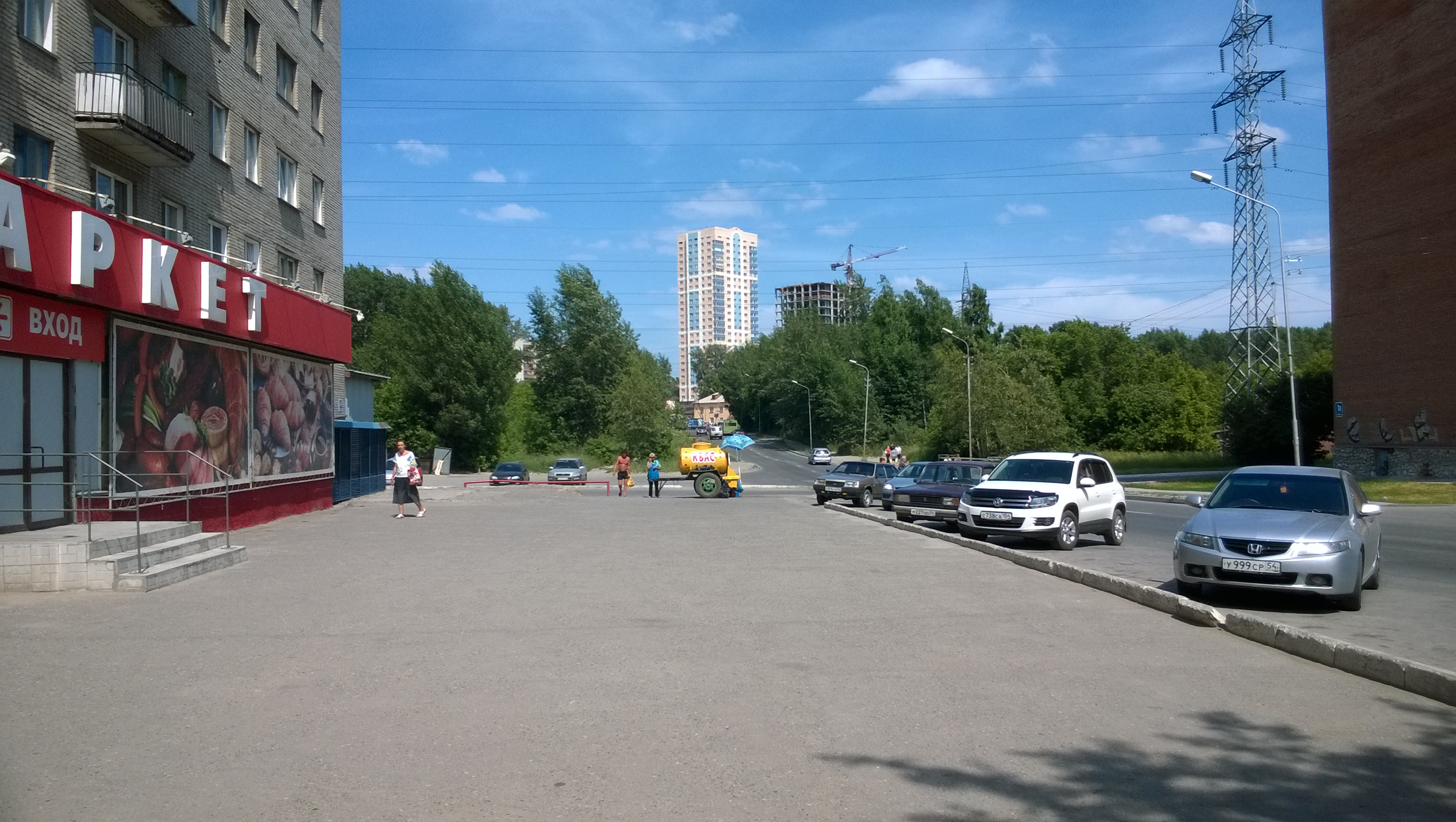
Sofiyskaya Street

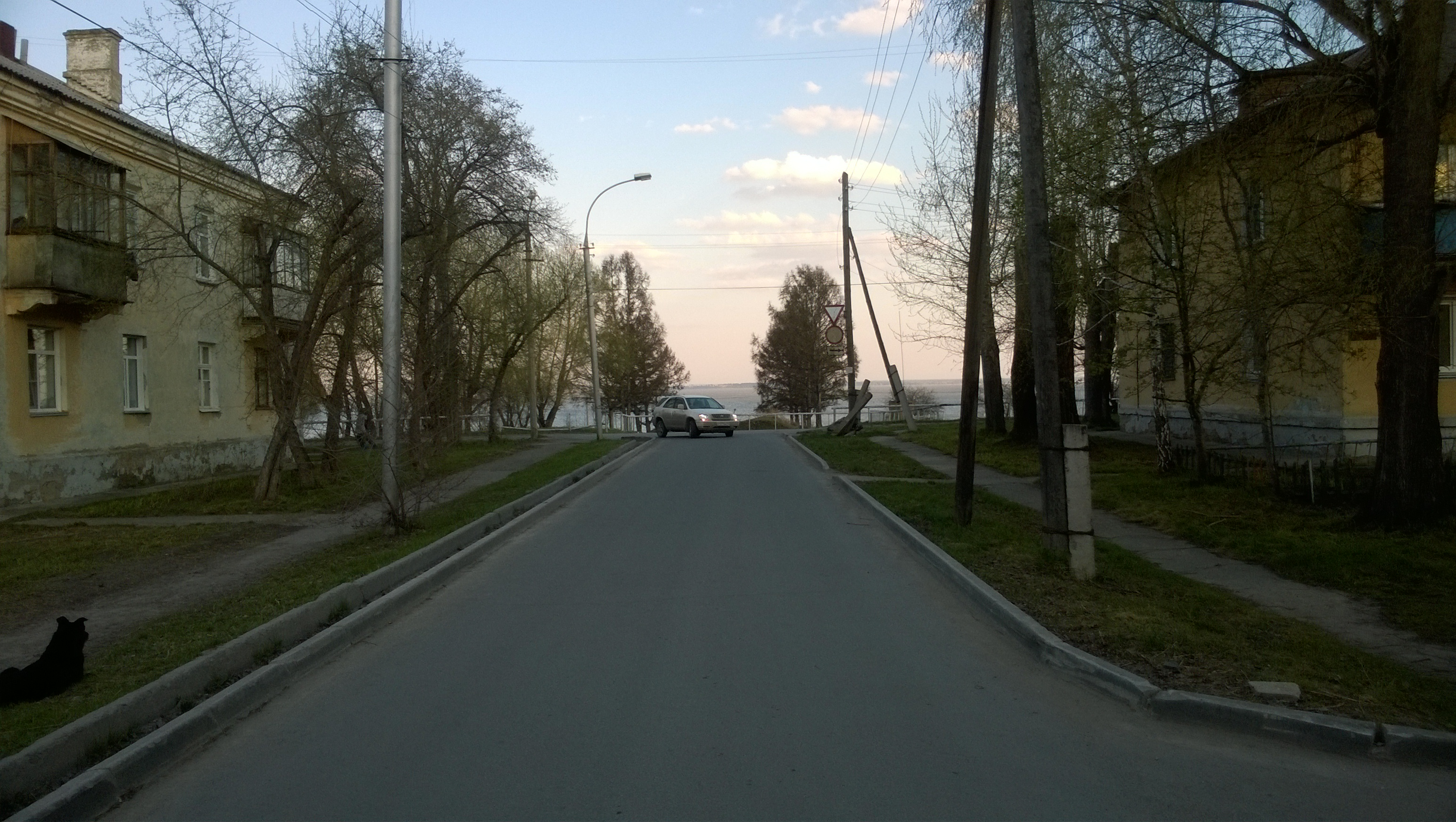
Mukhachyov Street

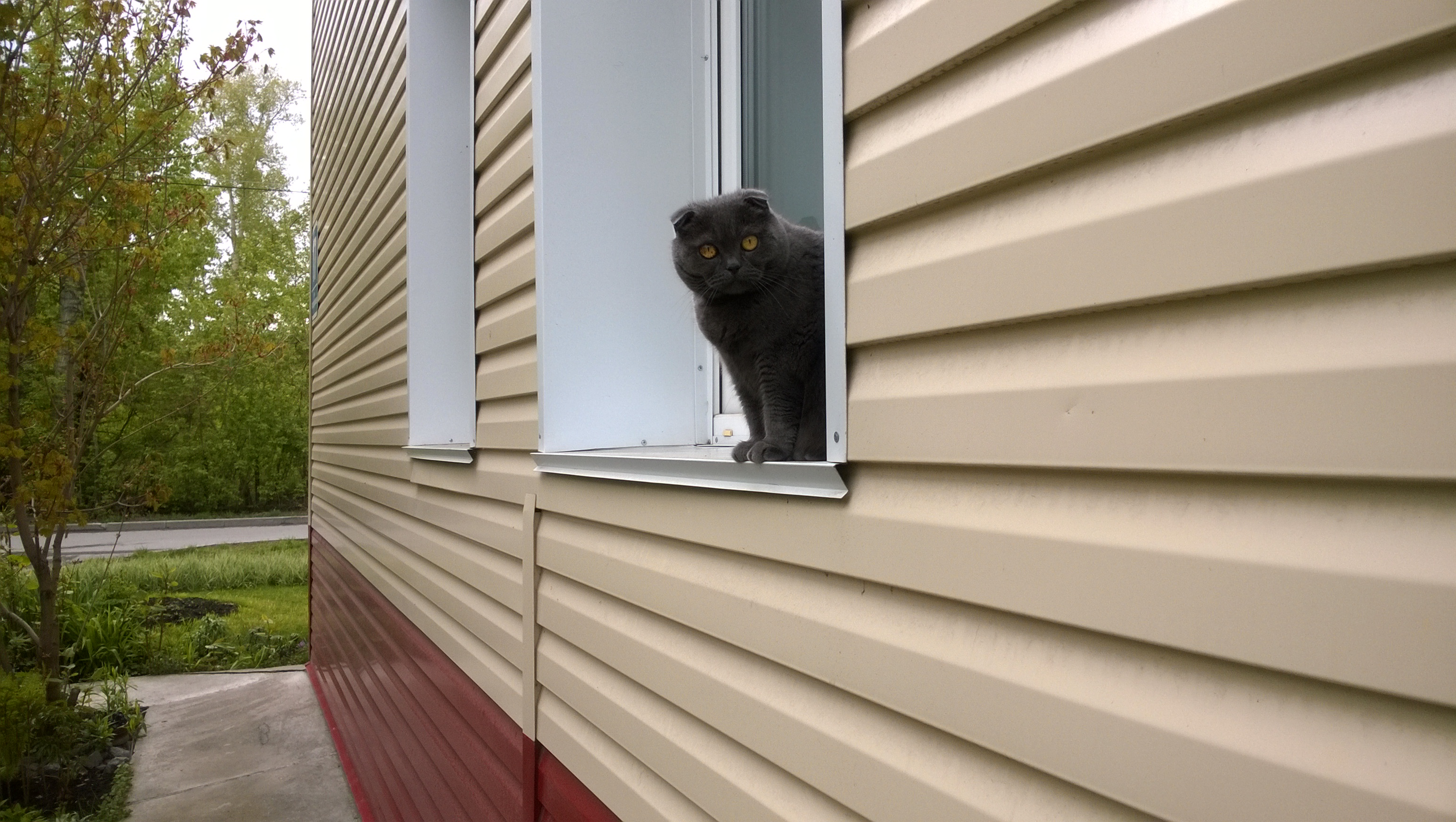
Krasnoufimskaya Street

== Organizations ==
- Novosibirsk Capacitor Plant
- Taira Plant
- Pilot Plant
- ORMZ
- Ob Hydrometeorological Observatory
- RusHydro
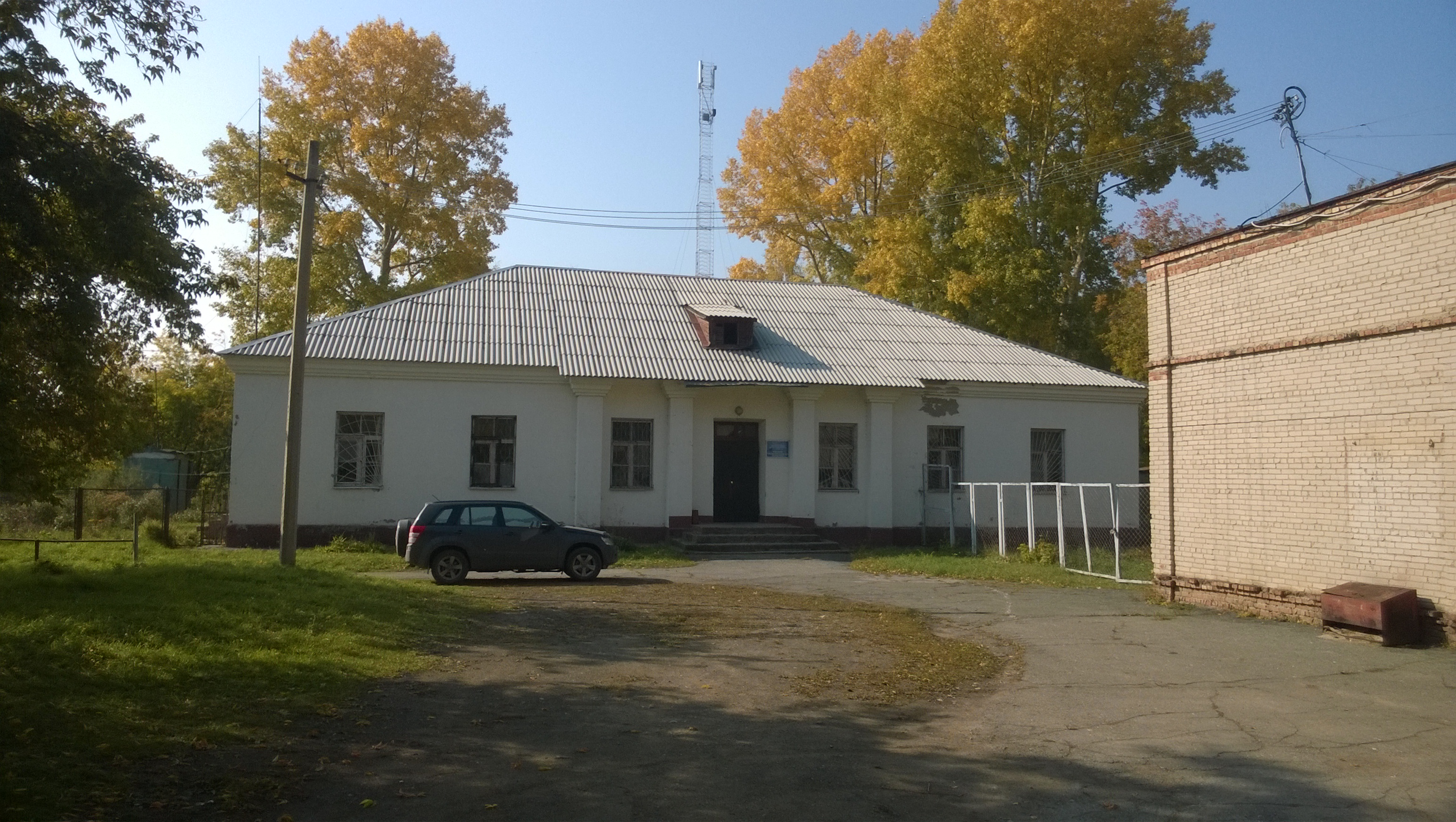
Ob Hydrometeorological Observatory

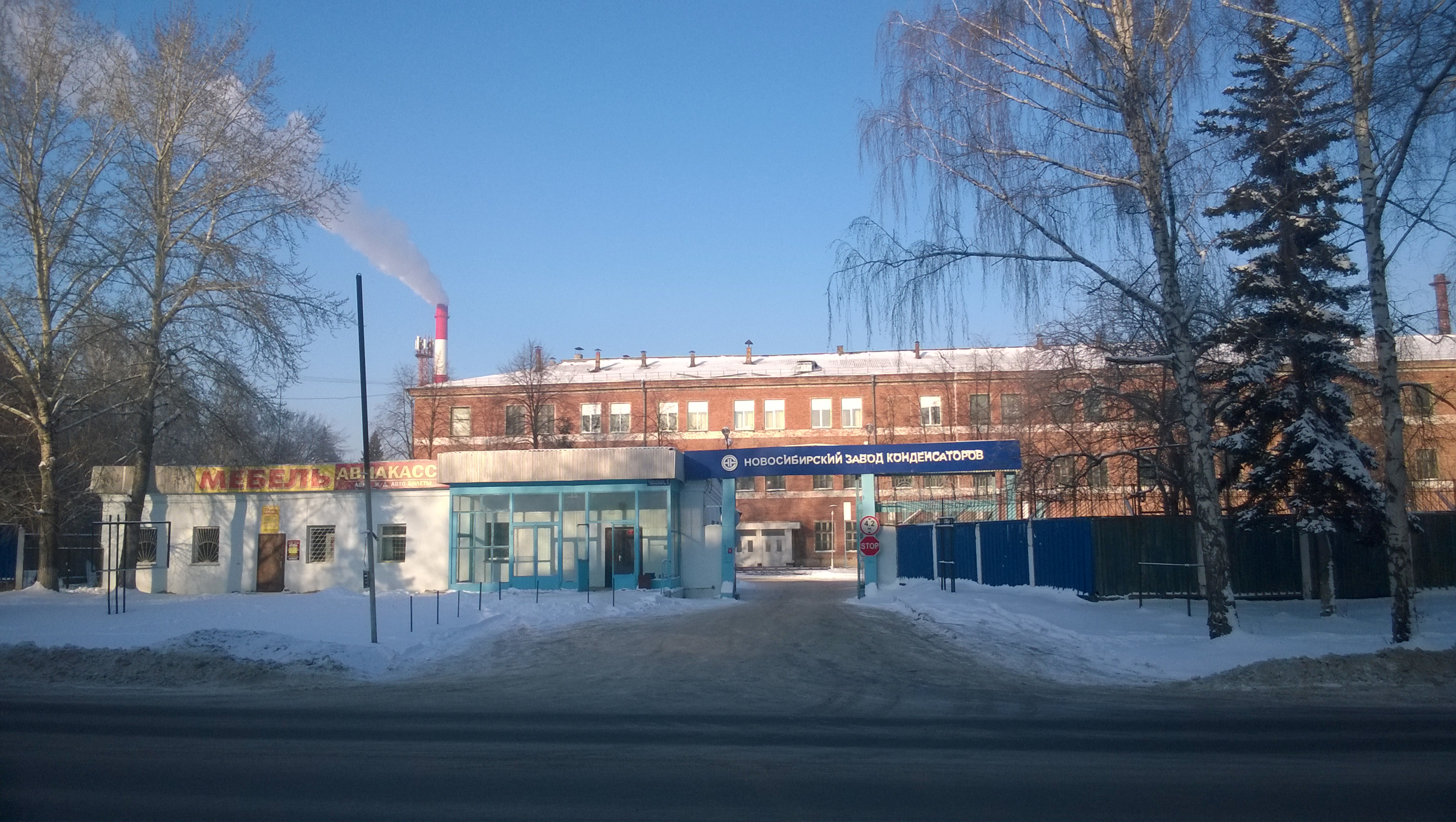
Novosibirsk Capacitor Plant

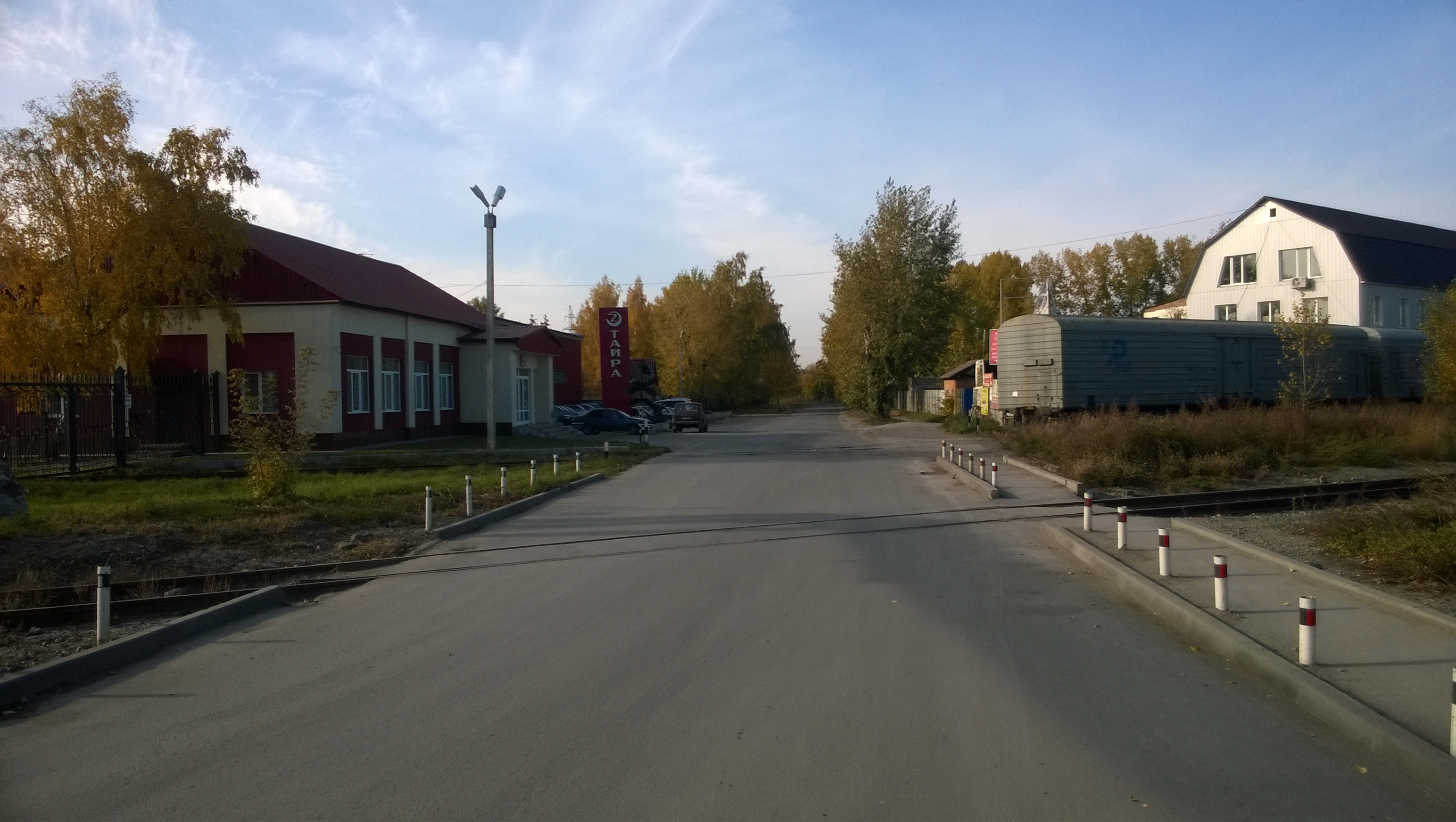
Taira Plant

== Monuments and memorials ==
- Statue of the Soldier-Liberator
- Conquerors of Ob is a mosaic panel created in 1970 by Vladimir Sokol.
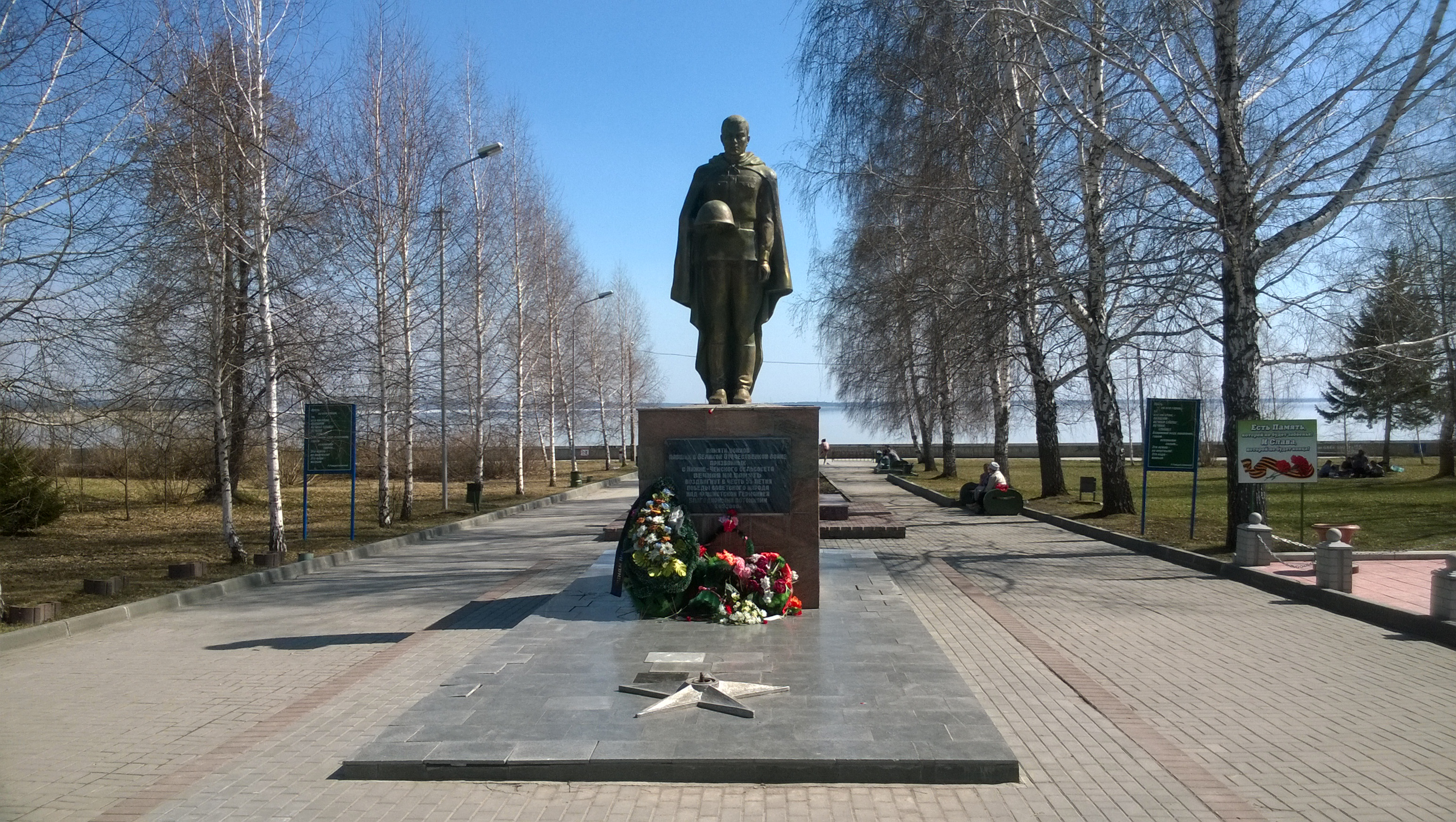

== Recreation ==
Вeaches of Novosibirsk Reservoir are located in the microdistrict.

By the Ob Sea Park is a park located in Chemskoy Pine Forest. It was created in 1957 by the builders of the hydroelectric power.

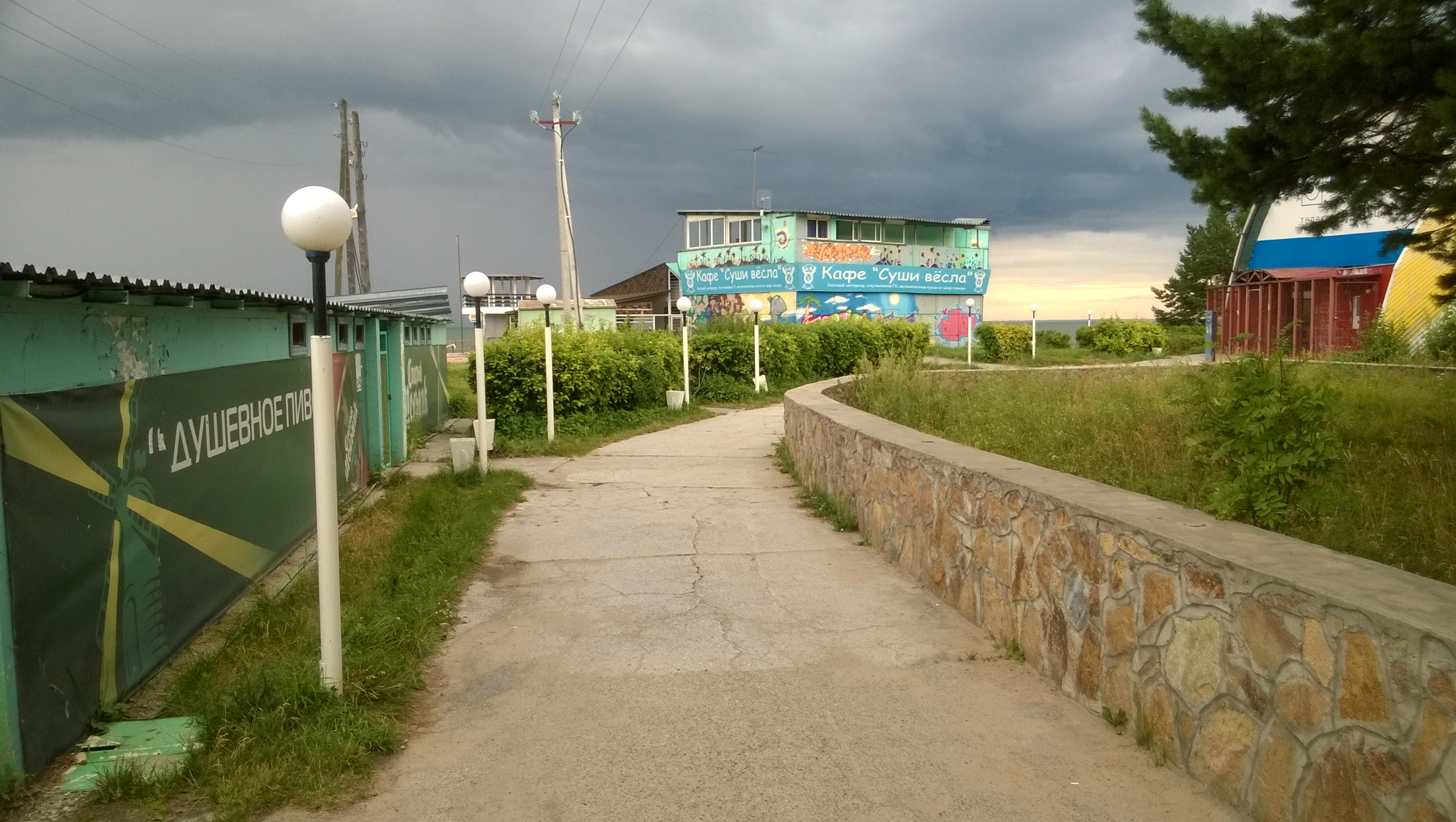

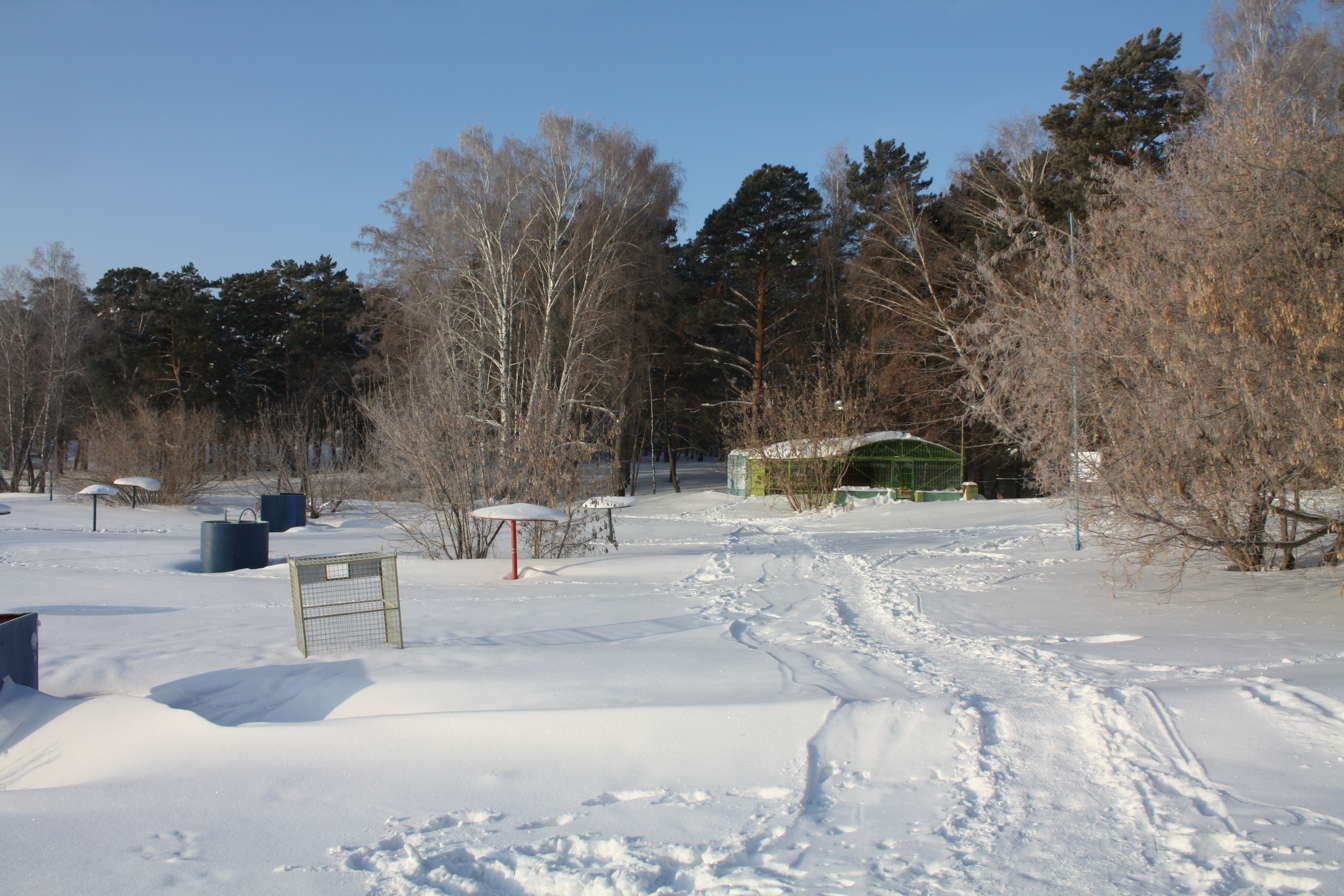

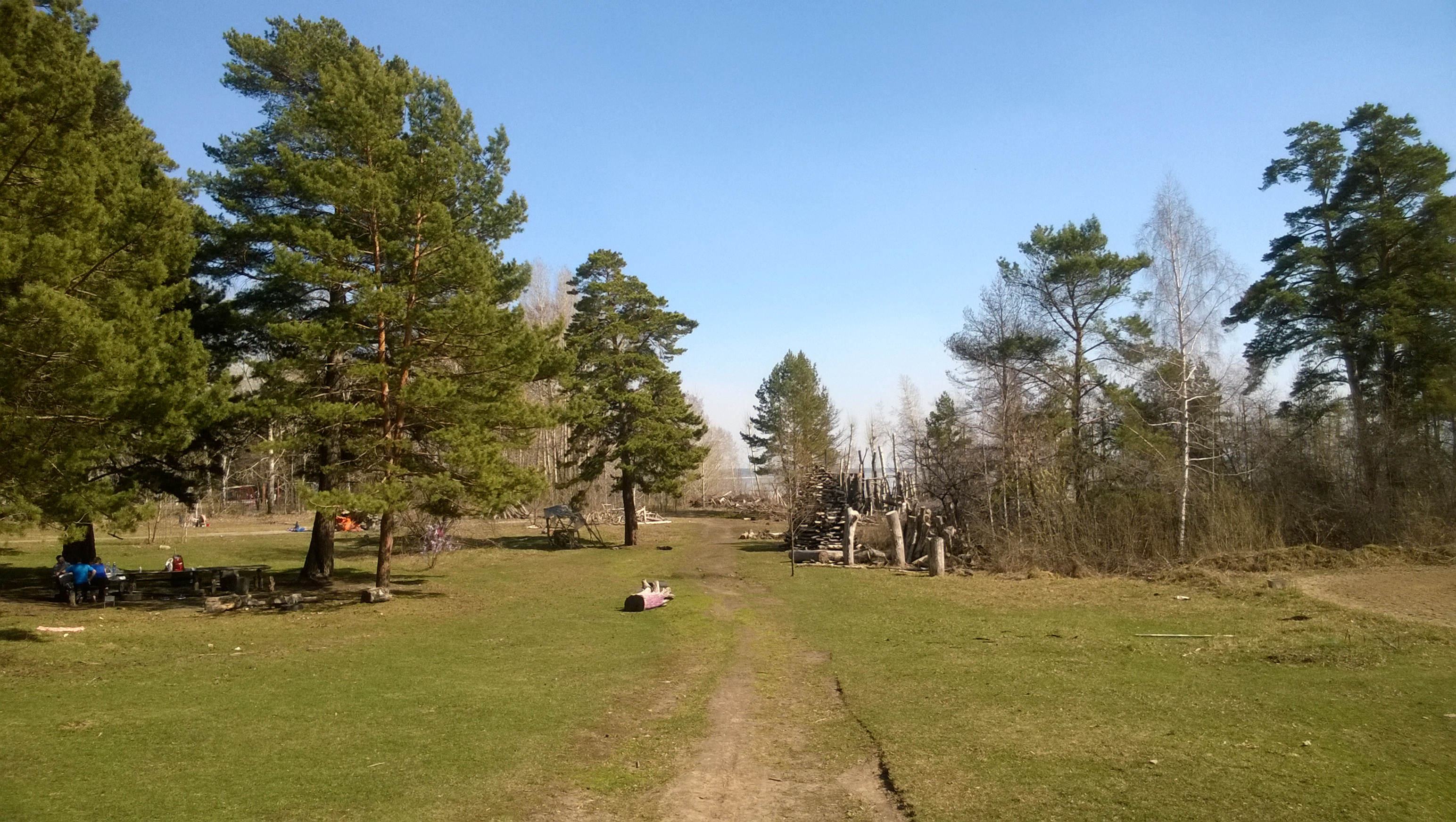

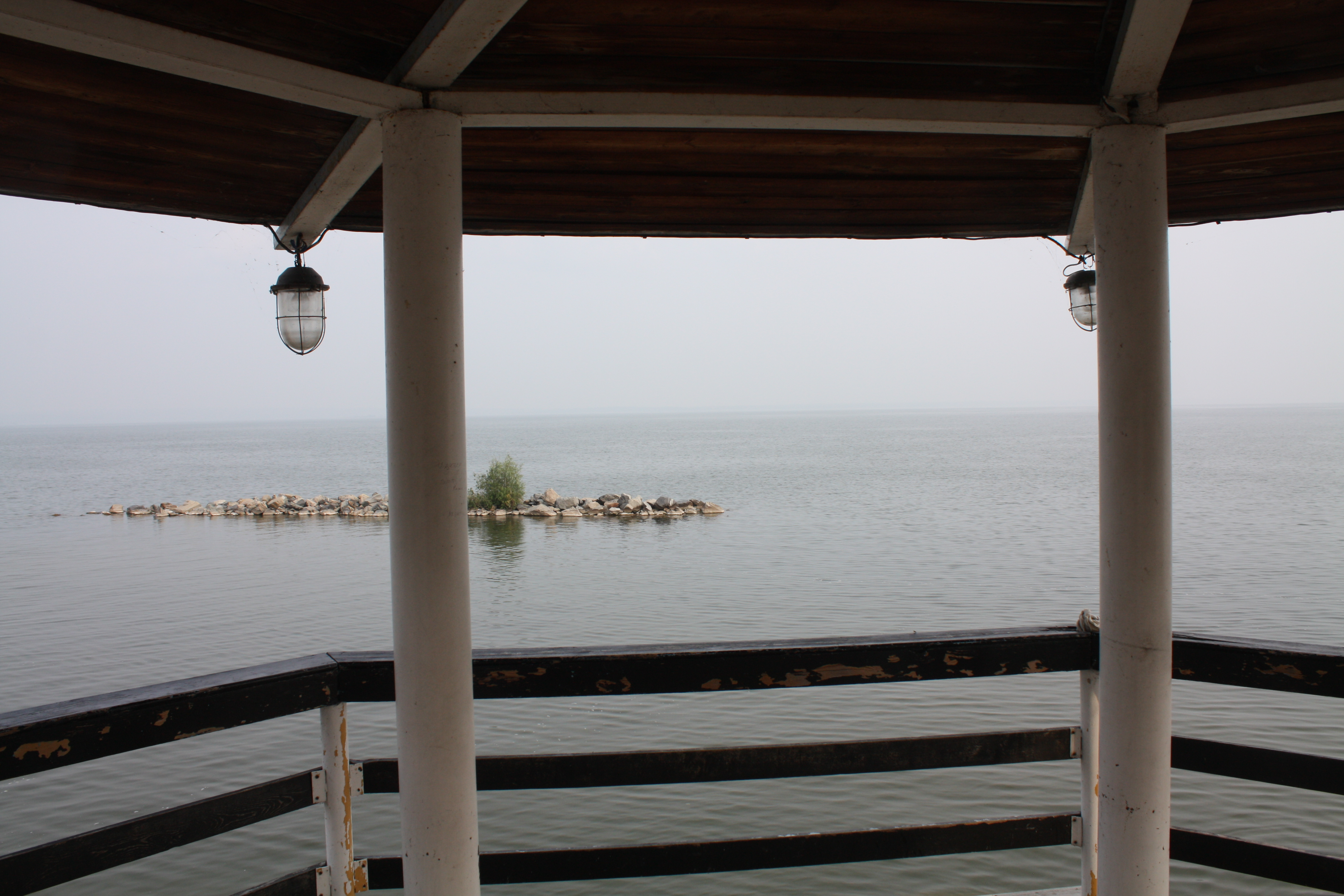
