= Tereshkova (disambiguation) =

Valentina Tereshkova (born 1937) is a Russian cosmonaut and the first woman to travel in outer space.

Tereshkova may also refer to:

- Tereshkova (crater), a lunar crater
- Tereshkova Street, Novosibirsk, a street in Akademgorodok, Russia

== People with the surname ==
- Olga Tereshkova (born 1984), Kazakh former sprinter who specialized in the 400 metres

== See also ==
- Terekhov
- Tereshkov
