= Academician Koptyug Avenue, Novosibirsk =

Street in Novosibirsk, Russia

Koptyug Avenue
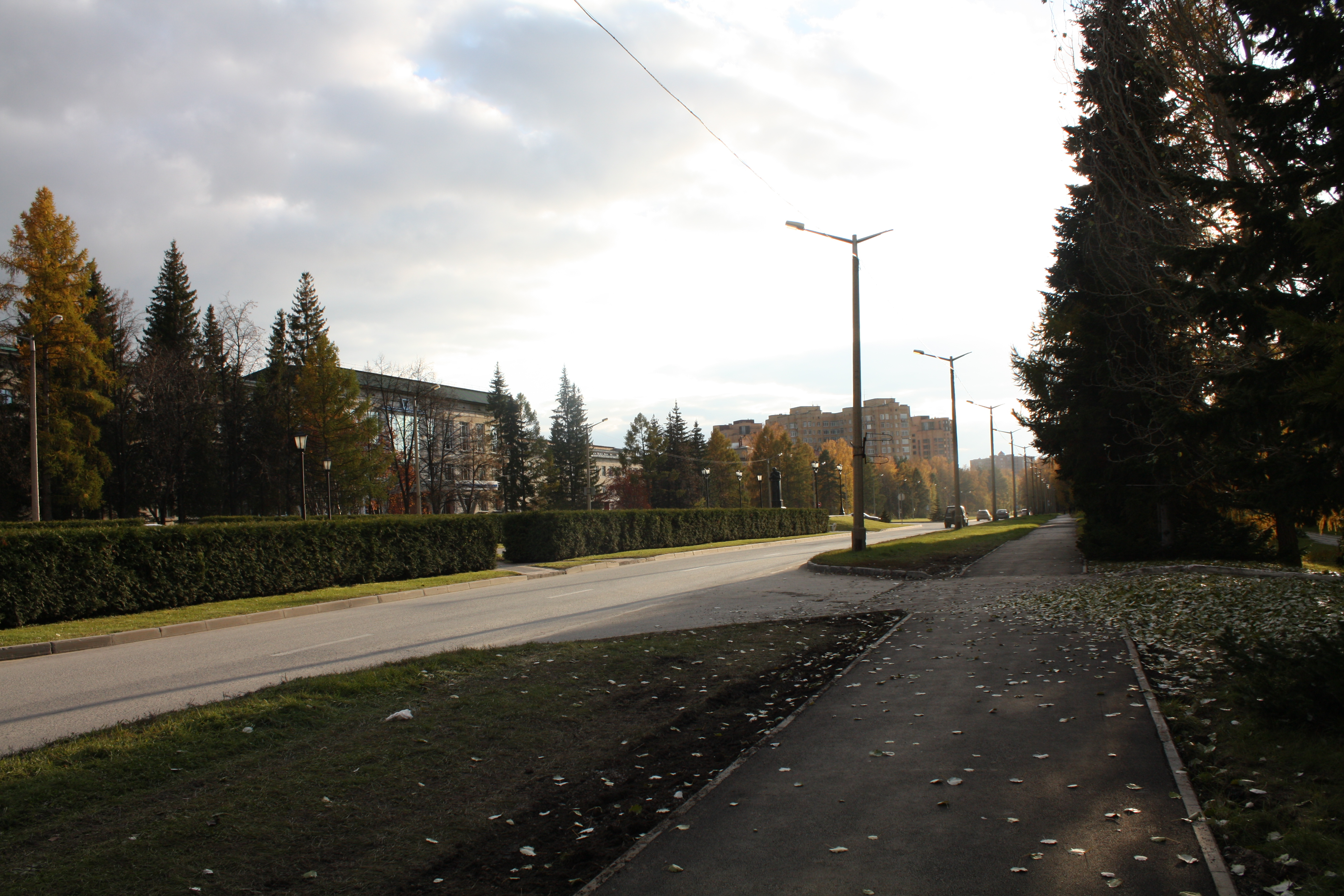
- Native name: Проспект Коптюга (Russian)
- Location: Novosibirsk; Russia

Academician Koptyug Avenue or Academician Koptyug Prospekt (Russian: Проспект академика Коптюга) is a street in the Akademgorodok of Novosibirsk, Russia. The avenue runs from Academician Lavrentyev Avenue and ends at the intersection with Tereshkova Street and Universitetsky Avenue. The street is named after Valentin Koptyug.

== Research organizations ==
=== Siberian Branch of the Russian Academy of Sciences ===
- Institute of Cytology and Genetics
- Institute of Automation and Electrometry
- Sobolev Institute of Mathematics
- Trofimuk Institute of Petroleum-Gas Geology and Geophysics
- Sobolev Institute of Geology and Mineralogy
- Geophysical Survey RAS (GS RAS)

=== Other research organizations ===
- Russian Geographical Society

== Companies ==
- ICiG-Plus is a company selling domesticated red fox bred in the Institute of Cytology and Genetics.
- Novosoft. IT-company based in 1990s.
- SoftLab-NSK is a Soviet and Russian company based in 1988. The company develops computer games, virtual simulators for astronauts, railway workers, etc.

== Gallery ==
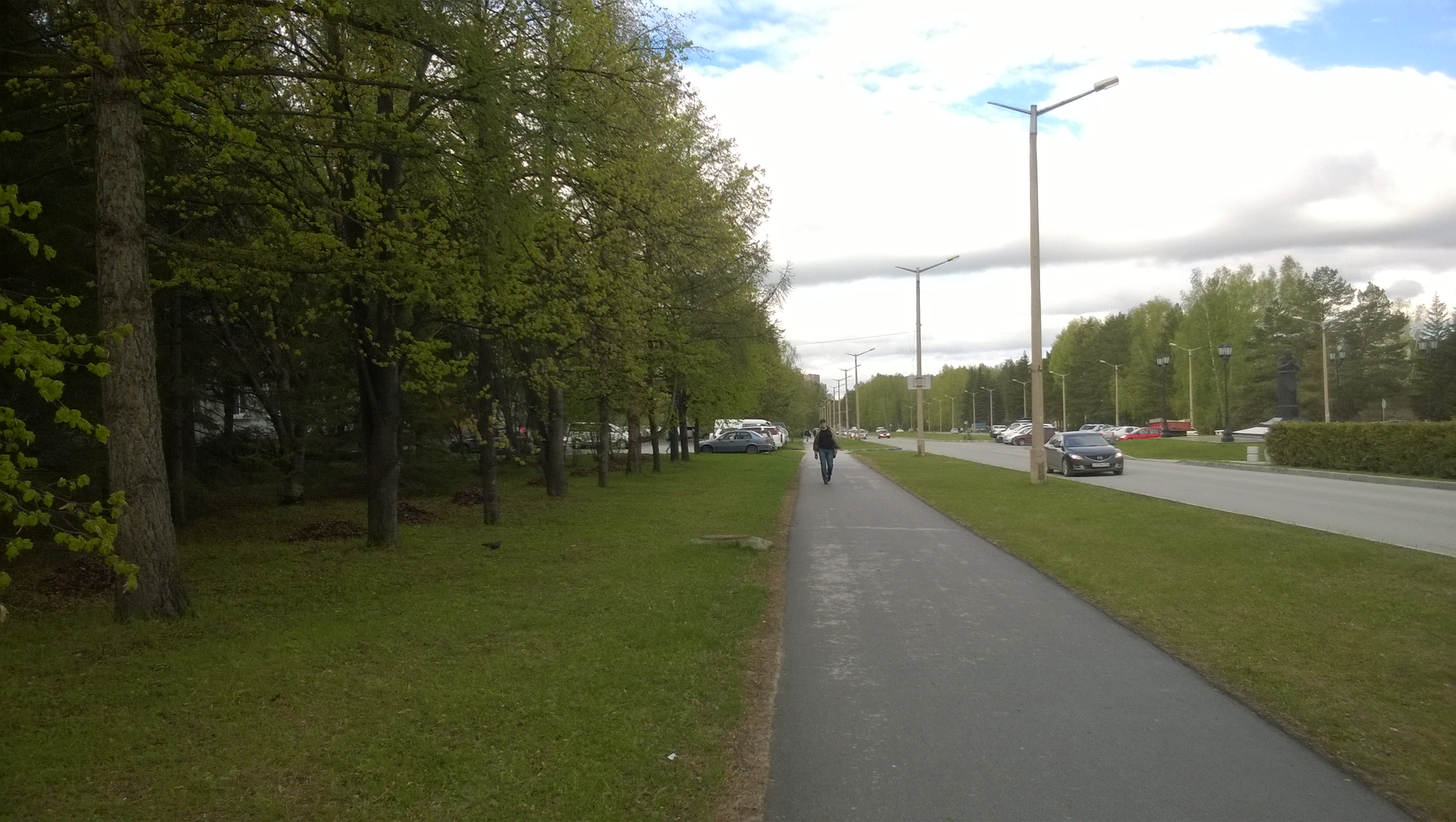

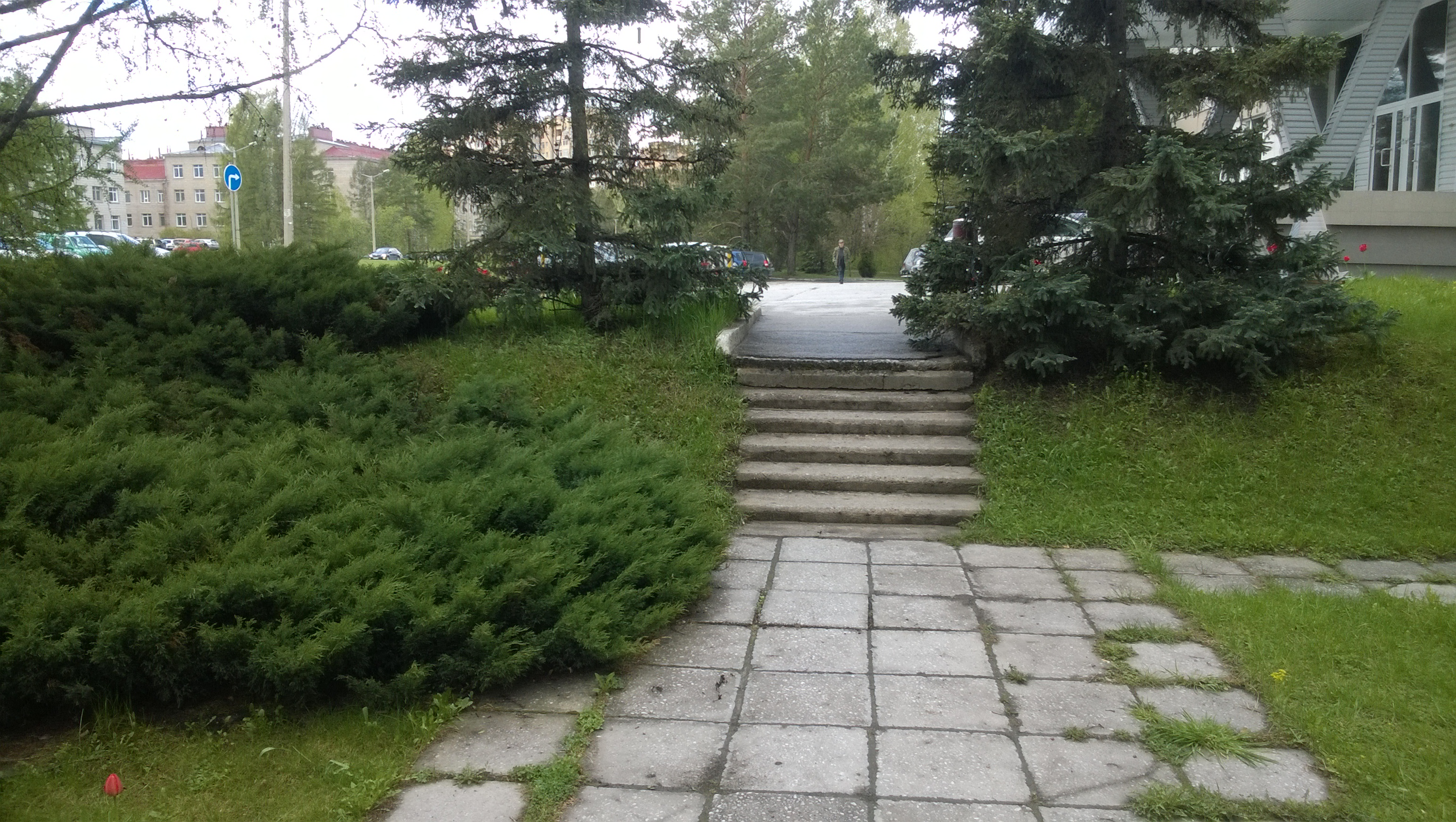

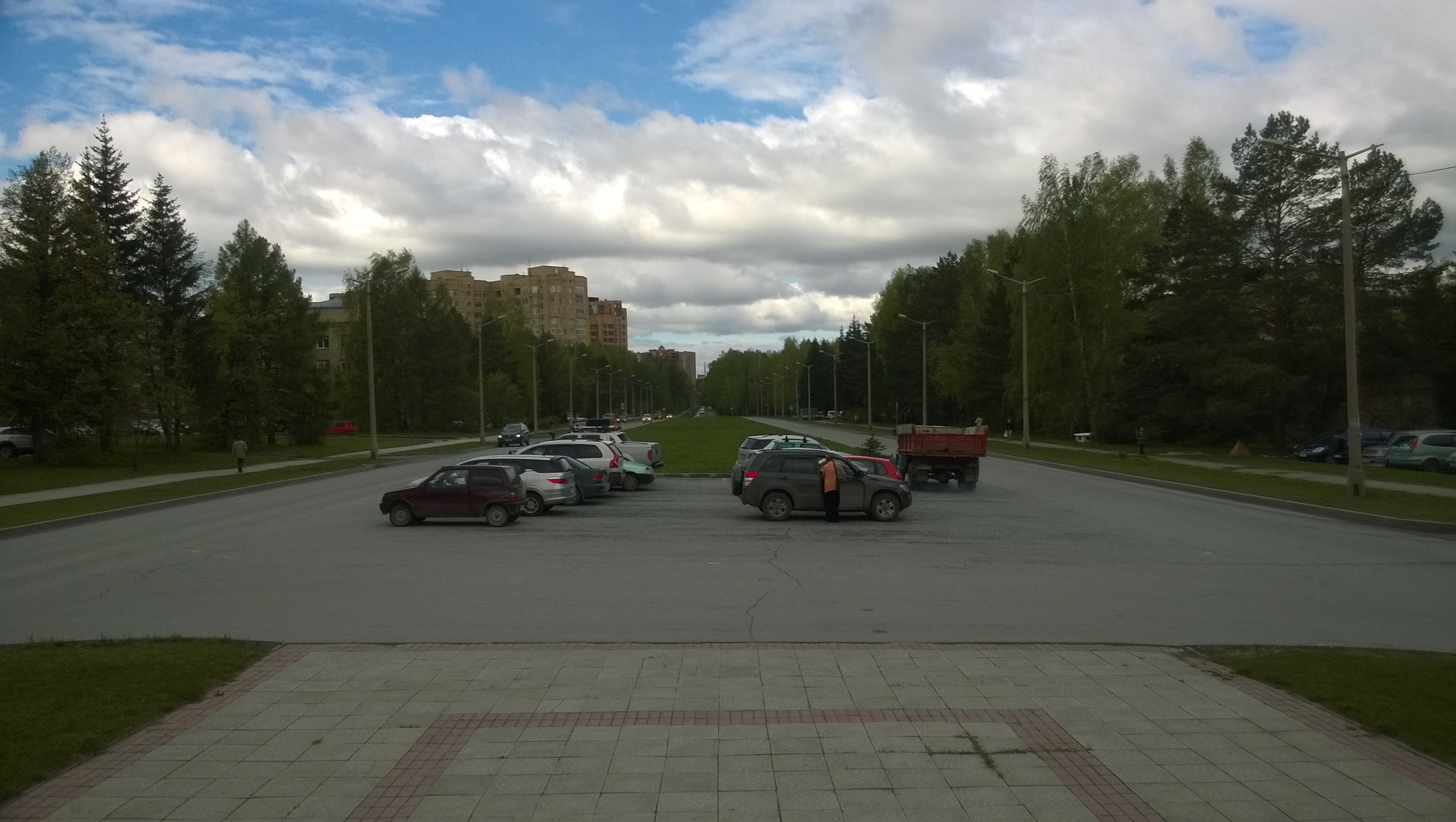

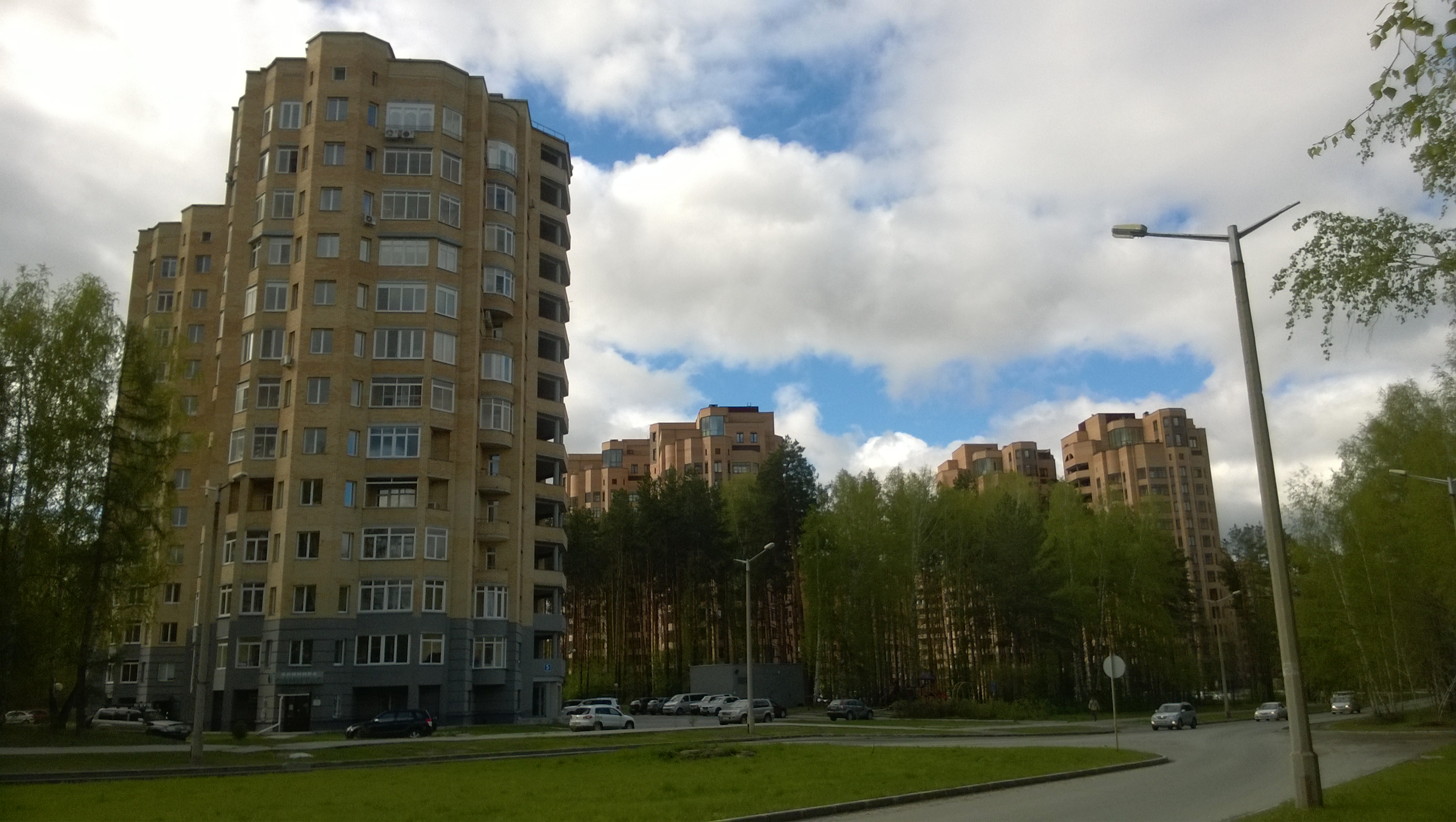
