= Mirsaidov =

Mirsaidov is a Central Asian masculine surname, its feminine counterpart is Mirsaidova. It may refer to the following notable people:

- Shukrullo Mirsaidov (1939–2012), politician in Uzbekistan
- Ulmas Mirsaidov (born 1945), Tajik theoretical chemist
