= D. Mendeleev University of Chemical Technology of Russia =

University in Moscow, Russia

- Российский химико-технологический университет имени Д. И. Менделеева
- Former names: The Moscow Industrial School, Moscow D. Mendeleev Institute of Chemical Technology (MCTI), University of Chemical Technology of Russia
- Type: Public
- Established: 1898
- Rector: Ilya Vorotyntsev
- Students: 9,000 (as of 2020)
- Location: Moscow, Russia
- Campus: Urban
- Language: Ru
- Website: muctr.ru
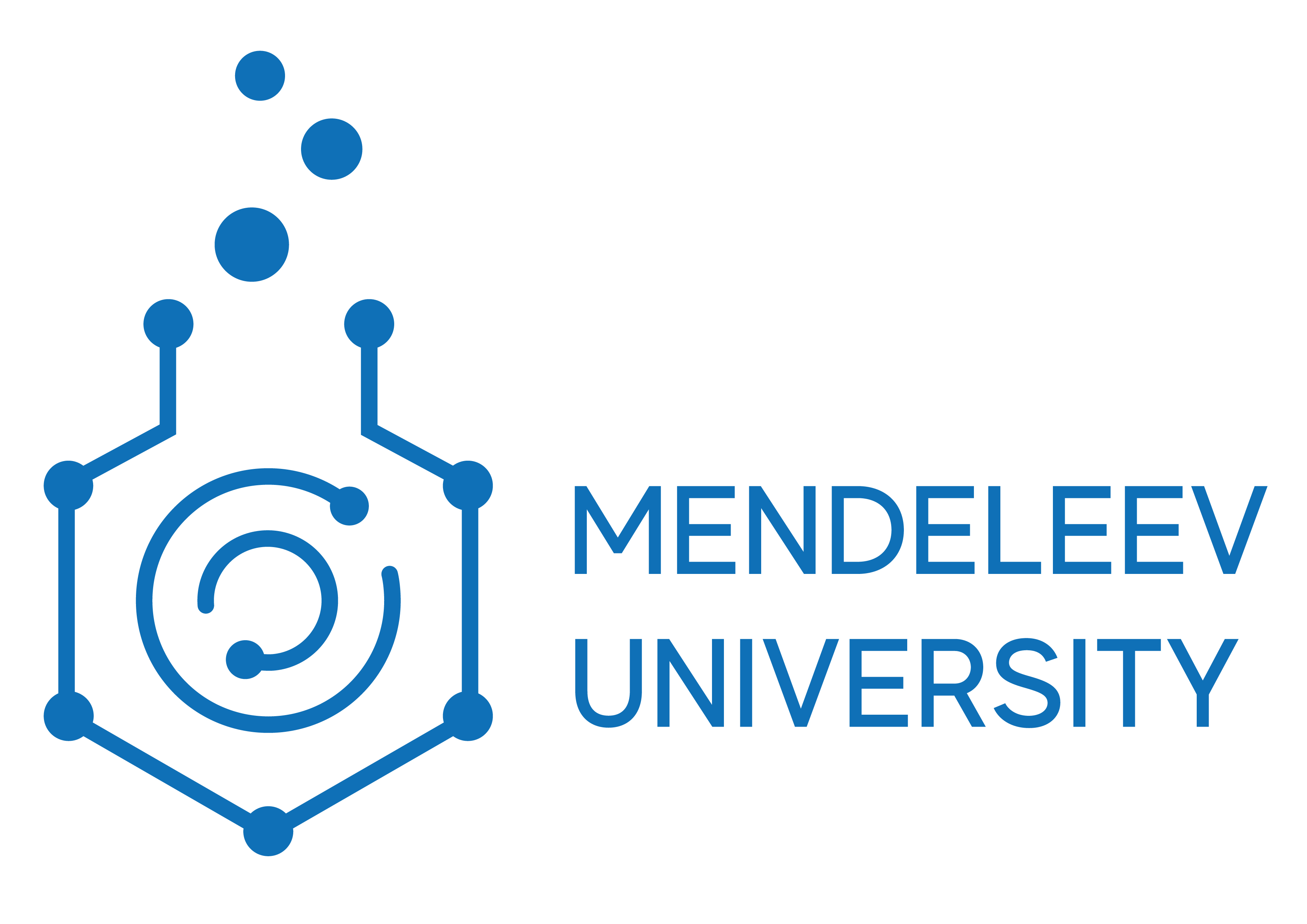

University rankings

Global – Overall
- USNWR Global: 1,955 (2023)

Regional – Overall
- QS Emerging Europe and Central Asia: 177 (2022)

D. Mendeleev University of Chemical Technology of Russia (MUCTR; Russian: Российский химико-технологический университет имени Д. И. Менделеева) is a public research university in Moscow, and is the largest Russian center for education and research in the field of chemical engineering. The history of MUCTR can be traced back to the Moscow Industrial School initially founded in 1898. The university acquired its current name and status in 1992 with its Moscow campus mainly located on Miusskaya Square and in Tushino. The university's other two branches are situated in Novomoskovsk (Tula Oblast) and Tashkent (Uzbekistan).

The university offers bachelors, specialists credential, masters and PhD programs in various areas of chemistry, sustainable development, petrochemistry, biotechnology, materials of modern energy and nanotechnology, and several other specialities.

The D. Mendeleev University of Chemical Technology of Russia is one of the leading centers of scientific and innovative research in Russia. The university regularly implements projects carried out under federal target programs, as well as numerous grants initiated by scientific foundations. In 2020, the university carried out 202 research projects, with 40 grants from the Russian Foundation for Basic Research, and 9 from the Russian Scientific Foundation. As of 2021, MUCTR has more than 120 cooperation agreements with universities and companies from more than 35 countries around the globe. In 2018, under the state program "Industry Development and Increasing its Competitiveness," the university founded the Mendeleev Engineering Center, which now hosts most of its laboratories and scientific equipment. As of 2021, preparations are underway at the Tushino complex to create an innovative scientific and technological center called "Mendeleev Valley". The Mendeleev Valley project was approved by a government decree issued in 2019.

== History ==
=== The Moscow Industrial School ===
On January 9, 1880, the Moscow City Duma approved the founding of several realschule in Moscow. The Duma would later allocate 100 thousand rubles in support of the project for the purchase of land and more than 260 thousand rubles for the construction of buildings. A year later, the Duma issued a decree establishing a new metropolitan institution - a full-time realschule with mechanical-technical and chemical-technical departments. As initially planned, the school was supposed to have a boarding house able to accommodate from 50 to 100 students. The inclusion of dormitories led to additional expenditures, and the overall construction cost for the institute increased to 360 thousand rubles. However, the very same year, construction of the school was suspended as a result of a new program of administrative reforms initiated by Tsar Alexander II of Russia. The implications of these reforms included the reformation of technical education in the Russian Empire while a new special commission of the Ministry of National Education was established to deliberate on the matter of technical education. According to the reports provided by the commission, the Moscow City Duma was planning "to build in Moscow an industrial school (secondary technical, four-year) with five general education preparatory classes."

In the end, the Moscow Industrial School would be founded towards the end of the 1890s. Initially, the building was supposed to be constructed on Volkhonka street, but this site was subsequently given to the Pushkin Museum.nstead the new site for the Moscow Industrial School was allocated on the Miusskaya Square – it was around 4000 square sazhens.

On November 18, 1896, the Special Construction Commission for the Construction of Industrial School Buildings was established with the geologist Alexander Krylov as its chairman and Maxim Geppener as the primary architect. On December 30 of the same year, Krylov was appointed the first director of the LPA. According to plans for the project, the complex of buildings included a three-storey "school building" (currently part of the Main building of the Russian Chemical Technical University overlooking Miusskaya Square), a three-storey "house for teachers and servants" (now the children's technopark "Mendeleev Center"), as well as a one-story building for LPU service. In November 1896 the Russian architect Maksim Geppener was appointed as the head of the commission dedicated to the construction of Moscow Industrial School buildings. On December 30 Geppener was also appointed as the first director of the Moscow Industrial School. Among the milestones included in this working project was the construction of a three-story educational building, a three-storey house for the professors and staff, and a one-storey campus for the facilities.

The ceremonial laying of the foundation stone of the Moscow Industrial School took place on May 23, 1898, and a decree issued by The State Council issued a decree that would imply opening the classes on July 1 of the same year. First, all the classes were held at the Stroganov Moscow State Academy of Arts and Industry with the result that students would only move into a new state-of-the-art campus equipped with all of the newest technologies in 1902 when construction was finally completed. The campus was finally inaugurated on 24 February 1903. During the official opening ceremony, it was declared that the Moscow Industrial School would be named in honor of the 25th anniversary of the reign of the emperor Alexander II of Russia. The first faculty of the school were top graduates from Moscow State University, The Imperial Moscow Technical School, as well as retired officers. The first cohort of 27 students graduated in the spring of 1906.

=== Moscow D. Mendeleev Institute of Chemical Technology (MCTI) ===
After the Russian Revolution of 1917, the name of Emperor Alexander II was removed from the title of the School. The following year the Moscow Industrial School would be renamed as the Moscow Chemical Technical College, and later, in 1919, it was given the name of the famous Russian chemist Dmitri Mendeleev. At that time, the Moscow Chemical Technical College was mostly training practical engineers.

However, the school would subsequently undergo a further spate of name changes and reorganisations under the new authorities. On December 22, 1920, the technical school was reorganised to become the D. Mendeleev Institute of Chemical Technology (MCTI) until on February 13, 1923, the school was again renamed the Moscow Institute of Chemical Technology (MHTI). With this reorganisation MHTI became the first specialised chemical engineering educational institution in the country.

In the early 1930s, the United Moscow Institute of Chemical Technology was created on the basis of MCTI and consisted of five main branches:

- The Moscow D. Mendeleev Institute of Chemical Technology
- The Faculty of Chemistry of the Bauman Moscow State Technical University (then reorganised into the NBC Protection Military Academy named after Kliment Voroshilov)
- The Faculty of Chemistry and Pharmacy of the Second Moscow State University (subsequently reorganised into the Moscow State University of Fine Chemical Technologies)
- The Faculty of Chemistry at the Moscow State University (returned to Moscow State University)
- The Moscow Institute of Chemical Engineering Engineers (founded February 22, 1931, on the basis of the mechanical department of the Moscow Chemical Engineering Institute, later reorganised into the Moscow Institute of Chemical Engineering)

By 1933, the United Moscow Institute of Chemical Technology had been dissolved as a parent entity, and the Moscow D. Mendeleev Institute of Chemical Technology became an autonomous educational institution.

At the onset of World War II MCTI would be partially evacuated to Kokand (Uzbekistan) as part of the evacuation of essential industries conducted by the Soviet authorities in response to Operation Barbarossa the German military invasion of the Soviet Union. On March 23, 1943, the institute would be brought back from Kokand and on June 15 of the same year, a new branch of the institute would be opened in the Russian city Dzerzhinsk operating until 1945. After the war in 1949, the Moscow D. Mendeleev Institute of Chemical Technology was granted the use of two building complexes formerly belonging to the Crafts School named after Pavel Shelaputin on Miusskaya Square. A decade later, in the beginning of October 1959, MCTI expanded again to open another branch in Stalinogorsk (now – Novomoskovsk). By 1965 the institute started construction of a new student complex in Tushino, however, due to a partial work freeze at the beginning of the 1970s, the process of placing the Tushino building complex into operation took quite a longer time than originally forecast. Another campus constructed concurrently with the one in Tushino was also opened in Shelepikha in the 1970s.

MCTI was awarded the Order of Lenin in 1940 in accordance with a decree of the Supreme Soviet of the Soviet Union. On February 11, 1971, the university would receive another prestigious award in the form of the Order of the Red Banner of Labour.

MCTI has honorary degrees to outstanding scientists and public figures with the practice starting in 1961. Notable awardees of honorary MCTI degrees include Krishnasami Venkataraman, Günter Gruhn, Dennis Meadows, Margaret Thatcher, Eberhard Diepgen, Jacques Cousteau, Samak Sundaravej, Galina Vishnevskaya, Yuri Oganessian, and others. MCTI faculty would also receive recognition such as in 1974, when Valery Sergievsky, Vladislav Nikolaev, Nikolai Kizim (teacher in the Novomoskovsk branch) and Evgeny Yurtov were awarded the Lenin Komsomol Prize in Science and Engineering for their work on thermodynamics and chemical kinetics.

=== University of Chemical Technology of Russia ===
After the dissolution of the Soviet Union in 1992, the Moscow Institute of Chemical Technology was renamed to become the D.I. Mendeleev University of Chemical Technology of Russia (MUCTR) which retained a focus on specialization in the fields of chemistry and chemical technologies.

From 1999 to 2010 MCTI and three other institutes (including the Moscow Aviation Institute, KBP Instrument Design Bureau in Tula, and NIKIET named after N. A. Dollezhal) were under one-sided US sanctions implemented after the backdrop of US-Iranian conflict. US government found the links between these research centers and Russian foreign policy towards Iran, claiming that these are "organizations promoting the development of weapons of mass destruction in other countries.". These sanctions would subsequently be lifted in 2010 after the US government recognized that contemporary Russian politics now "aligns with the interests of US foreign policy and security.".

Since 2015, the university has had the status of a federal state budgetary educational institution of higher education according to the decree issued by the Ministry of Science and Higher Education, the university has the status of a federal state budgetary educational institution of higher education. In the same year the rector of the university Vladimir Kolesnikov was fired because he was unable to comply with the obligation to increase teachers' salaries granted earlier by a decree of the President of Russia.

In 2016, the Ministry of Higher Education attempted to merge the University of Chemical Technology of Russia with the National University of Science and Technology MISiS. However, the plan was not implemented after as a public petition campaign initiated to preserve the autonomy of Mendeleev University gained several tens of thousands of signatures.

In September 2021, Professor Ilya Vorotyntsev was appointed as the acting rector of the university. As of 2021, the university included eight faculties, two institutes, the Higher Chemical College of the Russian Academy of Sciences, the Children's Technopark, the Center for Digital Transformation, and various other research and educational centers and laboratories. The university prepares bachelors, specialists, masters, postgraduate and doctoral students for careers in the fields of chemical technology, sustainable development, petrochemistry, biotechnology and other areas. As of 2020, there were approximately 9,000 students enrolled at MUCTR, out of which around 800 hailed from the Commonwealth of Independent States, Myanmar, Iraq, India, China, United States, European Union, and African countries. In 2021 the Ministry of Higher Education included MUCTR in the new program "Priority 2030" aimed at supporting domestic universities. The program launched after the conclusion of a prior education initiative under the title Project 5-100. As a result of these programs, MUCTR became a part of the second group of universities in "Territorial and/or industry leadership", qualifying MUCTR to receive additional federal sponsorship till the end of 2022.

== Structure ==
As of the 2021/22 academic year, the university has the following structure:

Faculties

- Faculty of Biotechnology and Industrial Ecology
- Faculty of Natural Sciences
- Faculty of Chemical Engineering
- Faculty of Digital Technologies and Chemical Engineering
- Faculty of Technology of Oil & Gas Chemistry and Polymer Materials
- Faculty of Technology of Inorganic Substances and High-Temperature Materials
- Faculty of Chemical and Pharmaceutical Technologies and Biomedical Products
- Faculty of pre-university training
- Faculty of Humanities
- Institute of Modern Energetics and Nanotechnology (as a faculty)
- Institute for Problems of Chemistry and Sustainable Development (as a faculty)
- Higher Chemical College of the Russian Academy of Sciences (as a faculty)

Departments and more

- Department of magistracy
- Department of part-time studies
- Pre-university training center
- Night chemistry school
- Night math school

Branches

- Novomoskovsk Institute (MUCTR Branch, located in Tula Oblast, Russia)
- MUCTR branch in Tashkent

== Academics ==
=== Educational activities ===
Since 2015, MUCTR has been the head of the federal educational and methodological association in the field of higher education in chemical engineering specialties. Among other things, the association has been endeavouring to prepare new all-Russian all-Russian educational standards for the chemical industry. The university also remains the primary organization relied upon by CIS member states for training, professional retraining and advanced training of personnel working in the chemical industry. Starting in 2019 MUCTR has also become a member of the Rosatom consortium of flagship universities, a university consortium whose main task is to coordinate science and activities of higher, postgraduate and additional professional education in the interests of the nuclear industry.

In 2018 MUCTR signed an agreement with the Kazan National Research Technological University on cooperation in the educational sphere. A year later, together with Skolkovo Institute of Science and Technology, MUCTR launched a joint bachelor's program to train specialists in modern materials science and renewable energy.

In 2020, together with the Moscow Innovation Agency, MUCTR launched a master's program under the title "Business Management in the Digital Economy". At the same time, MUCTR signed an agreement with the Perm State Agrarian and Technological University to create an Internet platform that to offer programs in the continuing professional education sector. Recently in 2021, the university launched an online bachelor's program in chemical technology. This initiative was implemented together in cooperation with the Far Eastern Federal University, Tomsk Polytechnic University and other universities, with the support of Sibur.

As of 2021, MUCTR consists of two branches located in Novomoskovsk and in Tashkent. The history of the former branch can be traced back to 1959 when it started as a faculty of the Dmitri Mendeleev Moscow Institute of Chemical Technology at the Stalinogorsk Chemical Combine. Due to a rapid decrease in the number of applicants to this branch, there have been ongoing discussions since 2019 on the possibility of closing the branch. The first foreign branch of MUCTR located in Tashkent was initially launched back in 2019, while its official opening ceremony took place on May 27, 2021.

The curriculum is approved by the Ministry of Higher and Secondary Specialized Education of Uzbekistan, and training is conducted in Russian, following the Federal Educational Standards of Russia. The Tashkent branch prepares MA students for careers in materials science and protection of materials from corrosion, and chemical technologies of nanomaterials. BA students can pursue degrees in materials science and technology, nanomaterials and nanosystems; technology of artistic processing of materials; technology of synthetic biologically active substances, chemical pharmaceuticals and cosmetics; and safety of technological processes and production.

=== Recognition and rankings ===
2023

- 1,955th place in the ranking by US News & World Report.

2021

- 257th place in the international ranking RUR 2021 Natural Sciences World University Ranking
- 43rd place in the top 100 Russian universities in the engineering and technical fields, according to the newspaper Kommersant
- 47th place in the ranking of the best universities in Russia according to Expert RA
- 852 place in the international ranking of scientific institutions of the SCImago Institutions Rankings
- Entered the rankings of the global QS World University Rankings index, group 801-1000
- Small Grand Prix of the RBK Communication Laboratory in the field of scientific communication

2020

- 559th place in the world and 17th among Russian universities in the global ranking of universities Round University Ranking
- Leader in the ratings of employers in the field of biochemical enterprises according to the "Expert" version (developed with the support of the Ministry of Education and Science, the presidential platform "Russia is a country of opportunities", the Presidential Grants Fund, Ural Federal University and the St. Petersburg branch of the Higher School of Economics)
- Winner in the category "Effect of presence" for the best promotion of scientists in the media for the award "Communication Laboratory" RVC in 2020
- 48th place in the ranking of educational institutions according to Interfax (since 2017, the university is above 52nd place)
- 58th place in the ranking of the best universities in Russia according to Expert RA 2019 and earlier
- Reflected in group 1101-1200 of the international domestic rating "Three missions of the university" (2019)
- Placed in group 401–450 in the Academic Ranking of World Universities in Chemical Engineering (2018)
- Took 705th place in the global ranking SCImago Institutions Rankings (2018 год)

=== Research ===
In 2010–2014, under the “Megagrant programs”, MCTUR launched the International Laboratory of Functional Materials Based on Glass named after Academician P. D. Sarkisov. The laboratory was initially headed by the Italian scientist Albert Paleari and the head of the Department of Chemical Technology of Glass and Sitalls Vladimir Sigaev. One of the laboratory's key contributions has been the creation of radioactive microspheres that could be potentially used for the treatment of oncological diseases. In 2017 the university also launched the International Center for Laser Technologies which has been investigating femtosecond laser modification of the structures of optical materials. The center developed an "eternal archive disk" based on nanostructured glass. Distinctive features of this material include its durability, resistance to aggressive environments and potential to store large amounts of information. As of 2020, a prototype of a data storage medium with a diameter of 120mm has been developed.

Specialists from MUCTR regularly publish articles in international peer-reviewed journals in collaboration with Russian and foreign colleagues. In 2020-2021 alone, the media reported about the following MCTUR-supported studies:

- search for new forms of delivery of targeted cancer drugs using silica gel;
- work on natural plastic components obtained from agricultural waste;
- development of an environmentally friendly and economical way of processing sulphur dumps at enterprises;
- creation of a new sorbent technology for an elusive form of radioactive iodine - iodomethane, which retains up to 99.5% of the dangerous isotopes;
- study of hydrogen fuel and development of new inexpensive ways to convert hydrogen and its compounds from molybdenum blue;
- an alternative method of extracting xenon from natural gas and, as a result, reducing the cost of anaesthesia;
- development of new light-emitting devices based on aerogel from Silicon dioxide with embedded luminescent particles and much more.

In October 2018, the "Mendeleev Engineering Center" was founded with the support of the Ministry of Science and Higher Education and the Ministry of Industry and Trade. The coordination of many scientific laboratories, including ones specialising in petrochemistry, agrochemistry, pharmaceuticals, radiochemistry, polymer chemistry, and fine organic synthesis has been achieved under the auspices of the Mendeleev Engineering Center. There are more than 80 units of the latest equipment for elemental and molecular analysis, electron microscopy, and determination of physicochemical parameters of solids and liquids. In 2020, the center's profit amounted to more than 4.8 million rubles, and its revenue - was 42.5 million rubles.

In 2019, the Russian government signed a decree on the creation of an Mendeleev Valley Innovation Scientific and Technological Centre on the territory of the MUCTR Tushino campus. According to the project description, the center is supposed to unite both scientific and business representatives to reduce the time between scientific discovery and its practical implementation. Particularly it might help to stipulate import substitution in Russia in the field of chemical industry. There are five main startup trends in the Mendeleev Valley – high tech, chemistry, agrochemistry, agrobiotechnology and biotechnology; medical and pharmaceutical chemistry; special purpose and high-energy substances. Center has three main clusters which are all curated by the Ministry of Industry and Trade. Initially, the number of private investments in the project was estimated at around 5 billion rubbles. The project was supposed to launch in 2020, however, as of the end of 2021 the working date has still not been confirmed.

MUCTR and its Novomoskovsk branch work on the development of the Composite Valley INTTS, located on 29 hectares special economic zone Uzlovaya in Tula oblast. The project was initially supported by the Tula State University and later approved by the Prime Minister of Russia Mikhail Mishustin in January 2021. The launch is scheduled for 2023. MUCTR announced its plans to invest in the research on high-tech chemistry that the university scientists would conduct in the center. Besides MUCTR, the project is supported by the Moscow State University, Rosatom, and the Russian Academy of Science.

=== Partnership ===
MUCTR employees regularly participate in the projects sponsored by federal target programs, scientific grants, and research under agreements with leading companies in the chemical industry, including the state corporation Rosatom, Sibur, Pharmasynthesis, EuroChem, Mikron Group. As of 2021, the university has signed more than 120 partnership agreements on scientific and educational cooperation with universities and organizations from more than 35 countries across the globe. The university cooperates with such leading centers as Royal Society of Chemistry and German Maico-Mannesmann Akademie für Wissenschaft und Bildung.

In 1995, under the interinstitutional agreements with UNESCO, the university opened the program "Green Chemistry for Sustainable Development". In 2005, together with the Kurchatov Institute, Uralchem, and Uralkali, they launched the International Educational and Scientific Center for Transfer of Pharmaceutical and Biotechnologies. Since 2020, the university signed up an agreement with the Crimean Federal University and the Sevastopol National Technical University to study the process of how to make drinking water from seawater. MCTUR laboratories help the Gamaleya Research Institute of Epidemiology and Microbiology with the development of COVID-19 vaccine, and since June 2021 they agreed to cooperate to ensure drug safety in Russia.

In May 2020, MUCTR and the Russian Federal Environmental Operator (FEO) initiated the creation of a federal scientific and educational consortium "Advanced EcoTechnologies", the task of which is to create an infrastructure for handling I-II class waste and scientific exchange in this industry. Besides MCTUR and FEO, the consortium includes Viatka State University, Yuri Gagarin State Technical University of Saratov, Udmurt State University, and other organizations.

=== Other activities ===
Since 1905, the Academic Big Choir has been operating at the MUCTR. In the early 1900s, the choir repeatedly invited Sergei Diaghilev to participate in "Russian Seasons" in Paris. As of 2021, the choir includes around 120 people. The choir cooperates with the Polyphonic Association of the Tuscany, Milan Conservatory, Sheremetev Center Chamber Choir, Academic Choirs of Moscow State University, Central Bank of Russia and Rybinsk Aviation-technological academy.

The university also publishes largely-circulated newspaper Mendeleevets that since 2001 has been registered as media. Its first issue was released on June 27, 1949. The predecessor was the newspaper "Moscow Technologist", the printing press release of which was interrupted with the beginning of the WWII.

In 2020, MUCTR, together with the Federal Environmental Operator, launched the project titled Mendeleev Classes to promote the education of high school students. The project operates in Udmurtia, Irkutsk, Kirov, Kurgan and Saratov Oblast. Students could take classes in chemistry, physics and mathematics. Graduates of the program receive additional 10 points for the results of the state examination that will be counted upon admission to the university. In 2020, the university opened Russia's first children's chemical technopark "Mendeleev Center", its main audience is from 14 to 18 years old, but there are projects for children from 8 to 13 years old.

== Buildings ==
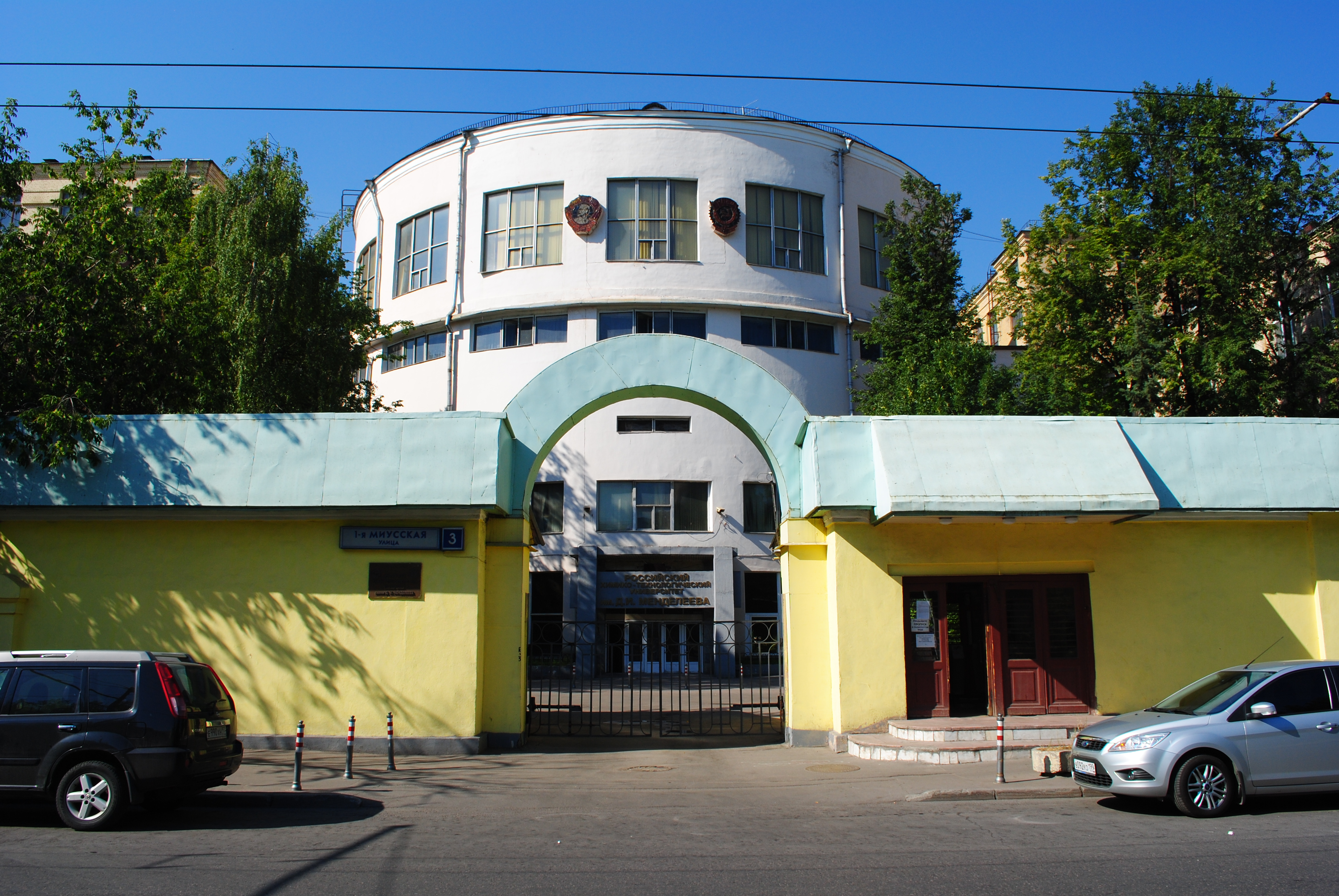
Checkpoint and the main building of the campus on Miusskaya square, 2010

MUCTR campus on Miusskaya street includes several historical buildings located between 1st Miusskaya street and Miusskaya Square, not far from the metro stations Mendeleyevskaya and Novoslobodskaya. The main building was designed in 1898 by the architect Maxim Geppener for the Moscow Industrial School in an eclectic style of architecture. Initially, it was a three-story building with large windows in the auditoriums, but later two other wings were added. In 1909 the main entrance was decorated with a bas-relief depicting Dmitry Mendeleev. Already in the Soviet times, the main building also got two more additional floors. In 2018 the campus was largely renovated with an update of brickwork, roofing, facade finishing, replacement of the drainpipes, and hydrophobization. The other buildings of the campus were founded at the end of the XVIII–beginning of the XIX century.

In May 1966, a monument to the university members who took part in the Great Patriotic War was erected in the courtyard near the main entrance at the expense of teachers, staff and students. The authors of the work were graduate students A. A. Volkov and A. A. Ershov. The inscription "Eternal glory to the Mendeleev soldiers who fell in the battles for the Soviet Motherland" is engraved on the stylobate while the marble slabs contain lists of the Mendeleev soldiers who died during the war.

Tushino complex is located nearby the metro station Skhodnenskaya. The construction of this nine-storey building started back in 2004. The overall amount of investments in the project amounted to 800 million rubles. MUCTR Tushino complex is one of the largest educational buildings in Russia with a total area of 27 thousand square meters that could accommodate up to 1500 people. The complex consists of three nine-storey wings, which house 57 laboratories, classrooms, and an assembly hall. The opening ceremony took place in 2008 and was officiated by Mayor of Moscow Yury Luzhkov. The territory of this complex is used for the Mendeleev Valley Center, the opening of the first facilities which is scheduled for 2021.

Central library is located nearby the metro station Baumanskaya. In 2019, more than 850 library units were relocated to the Tushino campus.

Shelepikha campus was opened in the 1970s, nearby the metro station Krasnopresnenskaya. Throughout the years the buildings hosted the Department of Life Safety, the Center for the MUCTR History and the Chemical Industry, the Faculty of Military Education. As of 2021, the complex is decommissioned.

Student campus is located nearby the metro station Planernaya. The campus includes three dormitory buildings with 758 student apartments, each of which might accommodate up to five people.

== Notable people ==
=== Rectors and directors ===
Directors of Moscow Industrial School

- Krylov Alexander Alekseevich (January 1, 1898 - February 16, 1899)
- Vladimirsky Sergei Alekseevich (August 7, 1899 - September 26, 1902)
- Doktorov Alexander Petrovich (November 6, 1902 - June 8, 1911)
- Zograf, Konstantin Yurievich (June 8, 1911 – 1918)

Directors of Moscow D. Mendeleev Institute of Chemical Technology

- Panteleev Vladimir Petrovich (March 1921 – 1921)
- Ivanov Alexander Konstantinovich (1921-February 1922)
- Tishchenko Ivan Alexandrovich (February 1922 - February 13, 1923)

Director of the Moscow Institute of Chemical Technology

- Dukelsky Mark Petrovich (1929)
- Gurvich Moisey Natanovich (March 7, 1929 - December 20, 1930)
- Chuzhin Yakov Emmanuilovich (1930-1931)
- Tikhmenev Nikolai Sergeevich (1931-1 March 1933)
- Orlov Illarion Prokofievich (March 1, 1933 - March 29, 1936)
- Maslov Alexey Matveyevich (March 29, 1936 - December 30, 1937)
- Pilsky Joseph Yakovlevich (December 30, 1937 – 1943)
- Dybina Praskovya Vasilievna (1943-1948)
- Zhavoronkov, Nikolai Mikhailovich (1948-1962)

Rectors of the Moscow Institute of Chemical Technology

- Kaftanov, Sergei Vasilievich, 1962-1972
- Yagodin, Gennady Alekseevich (1973-1985)
- Sarkisov Pavel Djibrayelovich (1985-11 December 1992)

Rectors of the D. Mendeleev University of Chemical Technology of Russia

- Kolesnikov Vladimir Alexandrovich (2005-2015)
- Aristov Vitaly Mikhailovich (2015—2016)
- Yurtov Evgeny Vasilievich (2016—2017)
- Mazhuga Alexander Georgievich (July 1, 2017 - September 29, 2021)
- Ilya Vladimirovich Vorotyntsev (September 29, 2021 – present)

=== Alumni ===
- Vladimir Yevtushenkov- entrepreneur, chairman of the board of directors and owner of the majority stake in Sistema.
- Boris Zhukov - scientist in the field of technical chemistry, academician, twice Hero of Socialist Labor.
- Martin Kabachnik - scientist in the field of chemistry organophosphorus compound, Hero of Socialist Labour (1978), laureate of the Lenin Prize (1974), Academician of the Academy of Sciences of the Soviet Union
- Dmitrii Knorre - scientist in the field of chemical kinetics, molecular biology and bioorganic chemistry. He was an academician of the Academy of Sciences and a laureate of the Lenin Prize
- George Koval - Hero of the Russian Federation (posthumously, since 2007), in 1940-1948 he conducted intelligence activities in the United States, since 1953 he taught at the MUCR
- Ulmas Mirsaidovich Mirsaidov - Tajik theoretical chemist and professor at the Nikitin Institute of Chemistry
- Valentin Koptyug - scientist in the field of physical, synthetic and applied organic chemistry, academician of the USSR Academy of Sciences, chairman of the Siberian Branch of the Russian Academy of Sciences, Director of the Vorozhtsov Novosibirsk Institute of Organic Chemistry
- Vasily Korshak - scientist in the field of chemistry polymers, twice laureate Stalin Prize (1949, 1951), Lenin Prize laureate (1986). He was an academician of the Academy of Sciences.
- Valery Legasov - Soviet inorganic chemist, full member of the Academy of Sciences of the USSR (1981), member of the government commission to investigate the causes and the consequences of the Chornobyl disaster, for which in 1996 he was posthumously awarded the title Hero of Russia.
- Alexander Kovarski - physical chemist and professor
- Joseph Leites - laureate of Nobel Peace Prize in 2007.
- Alexander Nastyukov - scientist-chemist, laureate of the Nobel prize.
- Oleg Nefedov - scientist in the field of chemistry, Academician of the USSR Academy of Sciences in 1988–2001, Advisor to the RAS since 2001.
- Boris Ogorodnikov - laureate of the Lenin Prize in 1966, chief researcher at Karpov Scientific Research Institute of Physics and Chemistry.
- Alexander Topchiev - Soviet organic chemist, academician of the USSR Academy of Sciences (1949), vice president of the USSR Academy of Sciences (1958-1962).
- Mikhail Khodorkovsky - entrepreneur, public and political figure, publicist, co-owner and head of the oil company Yukos.
- Yuri Tsvetkov - scientist in the field of materials science, academician of the Russian Academy of Sciences, laureate of Prize of the Council of Ministers of the USSR.
