= Valentin Koptyug =

Soviet Belarusian scientist

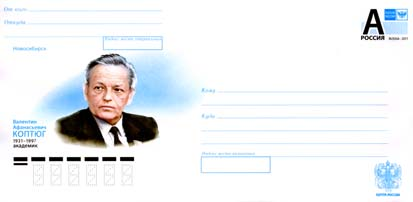
- Born: Valentin Afanasyevich Koptyug; June 9, 1931; Yukhnov, Western Oblast, Russian SFSR, Soviet Union
- Died: January 10, 1997 (aged 65); Moscow, Russia
- Education: D. Mendeleev University of Chemical Technology of Russia
- Scientific career
- Fields: Chemistry, cheminformatics
- Workplaces: N.N. Vorozhtsov Novosibirsk Institute of Organic Chemistry

Valentin Afanasyevich Koptyug (Russian: Валентин Афанасьевич Коптюг; June 9, 1931 – January 10, 1997) was a Soviet Belarusian scientist, specializing in physical and organic chemistry.

== Biography ==
Valentin Koptyug was born in 1931 in Yukhnov in the family of Afanasy Koptyug, who was director of the local communication department, and Nadezhda Koptyug, who was a telegrapher. When young Koptyug was studying in school, his family had to evacuate because of Great Patriotic War. In 1949 he finished school in Samarkand and graduated from D. Mendeleev University of Chemical Technology of Russia in 1954 in Moscow. In 1957, Koptyg completed postgraduate studies at this institution. He worked at the Mendeleev University from 1957 to 1959.

In 1959 the scientist began his career at the Institute of Organic Chemistry in Novosibirsk, where he was the head of the laboratory from 1959 to 1987, and then the director of this institute (1987–1997).

He was a chancellor of Novosibirsk State University for two years (1978–1980). Koptyug made a huge contribution in development of synthetic, physical and applied chemistry. Also, he founded some large scientific schools in the fields of organic chemistry and chemoinformatics.

There are a monument and a street named after Koptyug in Akademgorodok, Novosibirsk. Also, there are several awards and grants of his name for students and scientists.

Valentin Koptyug was buried at the Yuzhnoye Cemetery in Novosibirsk.

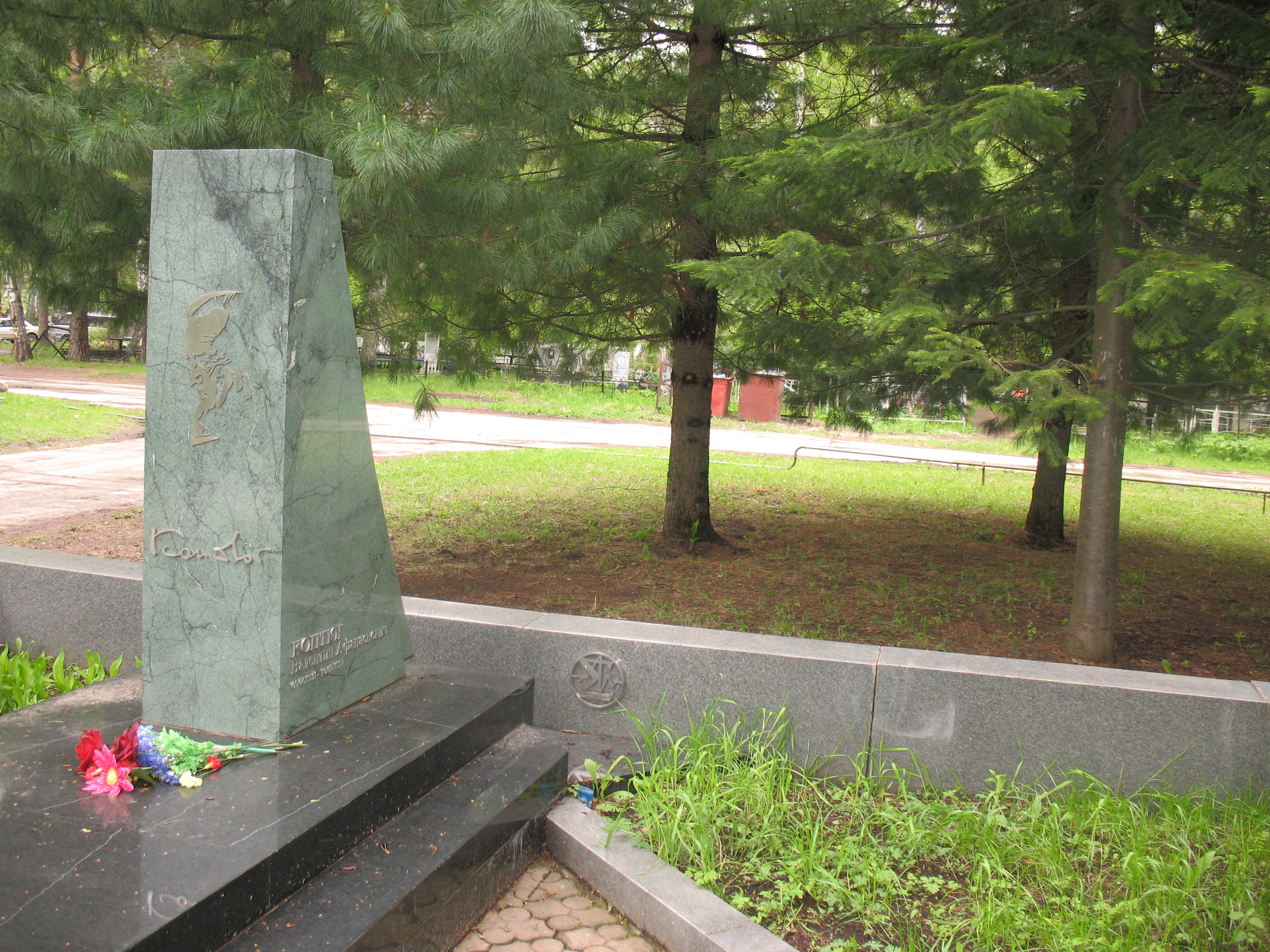
Valentin Koptyug's grave
