= Alexander Kovarski =

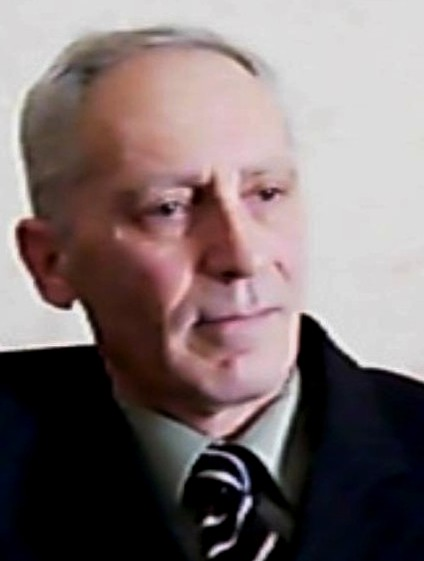
- Коварский Александр Львович
- Born: Alexander L’vovich Kovarski; 2 July 1944; Moscow, USSR
- Education: Mendeleev Russian University of Chemistry and Technology
- Scientific career
- Fields: Physics, Chemistry
- Workplaces: Semenov Institute of Chemical Physics, Mendeleev Russian University of Chemistry and Technology, Emanuel Institute of Biochemical Physics

Alexander L’vovich Kovarski is a Russian physical chemist, professor, member of Russian Academy of Natural Sciences, and member of American Chemical Society. His main research area is physical chemistry of polymers and composites, magnetic resonance of free radicals and nano-sized systems.

== Biography ==
Kovarski was born in Moscow on July 2, 1944, into a family of scientists which have made a significant contribution to Russian plastic science and technology. The father, L.V. Pevzner (1904–1988) was among the founders of the first Russian plastics center which devised and promoted to industry new materials that showed resistance to corrosion, oil, water, acids and alkalines. His mother, Professor B.M. Kovarskaya (1912–2006), for a long period headed the first laboratory on plastics aging and stabilization in the Russian chemical industry.

Kovarski started intensive research work in 1964 when he was an undergraduate at the Moscow D. Mendeleev Institute of Chemical Technology (RChTU). His first investigations were concerned with the problems of chain length maximization in synthesis of some acrylic monomers. In 1966, after graduation from the organic faculty of RChTU, Kovarski was admitted to the Institute of Chemical Physics, headed at that time by the Nobel Prize winner Nikolay Semyonov. He joined the division headed by Professor N.M. Emanuel. There he joined research projects on advanced trends in physical chemistry which were being developed by Professors M.B. Neiman and A.L. Buchachenko.

Kovarski was awarded PhD degree in 1972 for the development of spin probe technique applications to polymer research. In 1989 he defended his doctoral dissertation on the topic “Molecular Dynamics and Radical Reactions in Polymers under High Pressures”.

From 1995 to 2010, Kovarski taught a course in physical chemistry of polymers in the Mendeleev Russian Chemical Technology University. Since 2005 he heads the center for magnetic spectroscopy at the Emanuel Institute of Biochemical Physics of Russian Academy of Science (Moscow).

Kovarski is the author of 5 monographs, 28 book chapters and reviews, 5 textbooks for students, about 150 articles, and the holder of 3 patents. In 2004, he was awarded the V.I. Vernadski medal of the Russian Academy of Natural Sciences.

Kovarski's interests outside of his academic research include ancient history and painting. He is the author of a popular science book titled "Heroes of the old Testament". In 1997, he was admitted to the International Academy of Creative Endeavors.

== Principal scientific achievements ==
- A.L. Kovarski belonged to the group of researchers first used paramagnetic particles – stable nitroxide radicals as molecular sensors of structural and dynamic information of polymers (1966). This development formed the basis of a new effective method found wide application in material science and was named later “method of paramagnetic (or spin) probes and labels”.
- A.L. Kovarski conducted extensive research of the regularities of the dynamics of low-molecular weight additives in macromolecular substances that were presented in the fundamental monograph.
- Using high pressure technique A.L. Kovarski ascertained the role of free volume and molecular mobility of solid media on the rate of chemical reactions, and justified molecular-dynamic concept of reactivity of polymer materials.
- He established a mechanism of relaxation processes in vitrificated liquids and polymers (so called “α” and “β” processes) using electro physical techniques under high pressure.
- Using the original method of localization of paramagnetic particles on the surface of inorganic fillers studied by electron paramagnetic resonance micro-rheological properties of interfacial layers in polymer composites.
- Under the leadership of A.L. Kovarski new methods for the research of magnetic nanoparticles aggregation in dispersions and macromolecular adsorption on nanoparticles surface have been developed using ferromagnetic resonance and electron paramagnetic resonance. These approaches are extremely informative when analyzing the coatings on magnetic particles used in medicine and in composites.

== Sources ==
1. Who's Who in Science and Engineering. Margus. 10th Edition. 2008–2011.
2. Who's Who in the World. Margus. 26th Editions, 2008–2011.
3. Cambridge Blue Book of Foremost International Scientists. 2008/10.
4. Polymer News. 2000. V.25, N3, P.89.
5. Ju.М. Sivergin. Chemists of Russian Empire, USSR and Russian Federation. MSU Publishing House, Moscow, 1998, V.2, p. 167.
6. Polymer Sci. (Russia), jubilee issue of the Journal. 2009. V.51, No.1, p. 57.
7. Who is Who in Russian Chemistry. Handbook. Scientific Information Department of Russian Chemical Soc., Moscow, 2004.
8. Oxidation Communications. 2013, V.36, No. 4, PP. 1251–1252.
