= V. S. Sobolev Institute of Geology and Mineralogy =

Research institute in Novosibirsk, Russia

V. S. Sobolev Institute of Geology and Mineralogy of the Siberian Branch of the RAS
- Established: 2006
- Director: Nikolai Kruk
- Owner: Siberian Branch of RAS
- Address: Koptyug Avenue, 3, Novosibirsk, 630090, Russia
- Location: Novosibirsk, Russia
- Website: www.igm.nsc.ru

V. S. Sobolev Institute of Geology and Mineralogy of the Siberian Branch of the RAS, IGM SB RAS (Russian: Институт геологии и минералогии имени В. С. Соболева СО РАН, ИГМ СО РАН) is a research institute in Novosibirsk, Russia. It was founded in 2006.

== Activity ==
Since 2008, the IGM SB RAS, together with the Institute of Cytology and Genetics, was engaged in the study of the ecosystem of Lake Solyonoye located in Bagansky District of Novosibirsk Oblast. In 2019, a number of media sources reported that the Sobolev Institute of Geology and Mineralogy, together with the University of Arizona, determined the age of the Aral Sea.
