= Dmitrii Knorre =

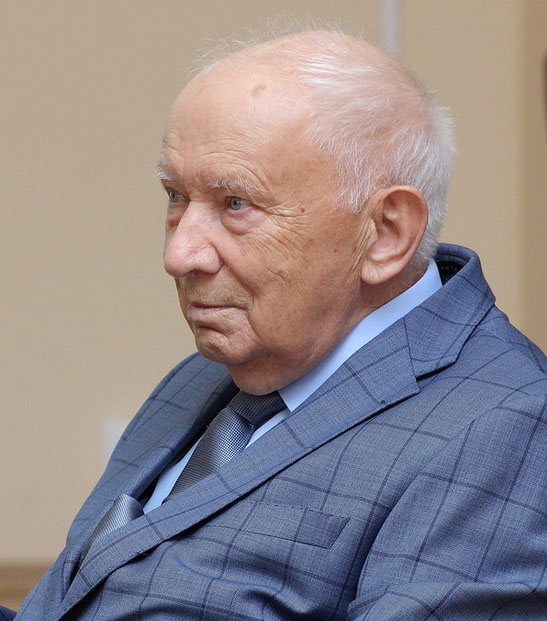
Knorre in 2016

Dmitrii Georgievich Knorre (Russian: Дмитрий Георгиевич Кнорре; 28 July 1926 – 5 July 2018) was a chemist and biochemist, a specialist in chemical kinetics of complex reactions, bioorganic chemistry, and molecular biology. He was a Corresponding member of the Academy of Sciences of the USSR since 1968, and an academician since 1981. He was assigned to the Division of Biochemistry, Biophysics, and Chemistry of Physiologically Active Compounds of the Academy and to the Siberian Division since 1981.

== Biography ==
He graduated from the Mendeleev Russian University of Chemistry and Technology in 1947. He worked at the Chemical Physics Institute from 1947 to 1960 when he joined the Siberian Division in a laboratory studying natural polymers and joined the Department of Biochemistry of the Novosibirsk Institute of Organic Chemistry. In 1962, he acted as Head of the Natural Polymers Laboratory of the Organic Chemistry Institute in Novosibirsk that was established in 1958 and whose basic work is in the study of aromatic and heterocyclic chemistry and in natural products. He was named the Founding Director of the Novosibirsk Bioorganic Chemistry Institute. He was elected to the Presidium of the Siberian Division in 1988. From 1967 to 1983, he was a professor at the Faculty of Natural Sciences and held the chair of the Department of Molecular Biology from 1979. Since 1964 he was a dean of Department of Natural Sciences of Novosibirsk State University for 16 years. He is an honored scientist of the former Soviet Union. He is a laureate of the Prize of the Soviet Council of Ministers in 1987, and the M. M. Shemiakin Prize of the Academy of Sciences of the USSR in 1988.
