= Trofimuk Institute of Petroleum-Gas Geology and Geophysics =

Research institute in Novosibirsk, Russia

Trofimuk Institute of Petroleum-Gas Geology and Geophysics of the Siberian Branch of the RAS
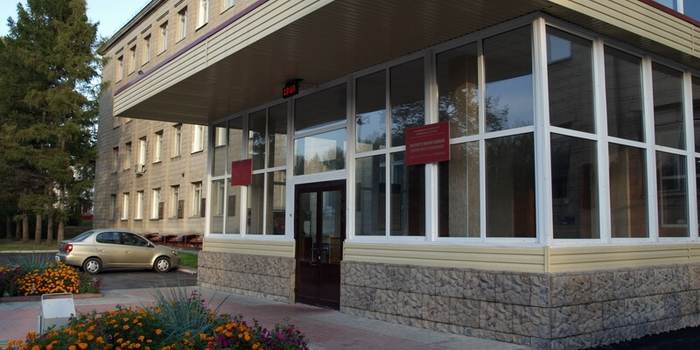
- Established: 2005
- Director: Vyacheslav Glinskikh
- Owner: Siberian Branch of RAS
- Address: Koptyug Avenue, 3, Novosibirsk, 630090, Russia
- Location: Novosibirsk, Russia
- Website: www.ipgg.sbras.ru

Trofimuk Institute of Petroleum-Gas Geology and Geophysics of the Siberian Branch of the RAS, IPGG SB RAS (Russian: Институт нефтегазовой геологии и геофизики имени А. А. Трофимука СО РАН, ИНГГ СО РАН) is a research institute in Novosibirsk, Russia. It was founded in 2005.

== History ==
The Institute was formed in 2005 by merging the Institute of Geophysics SB RAS, Institute of Petroleum Geology SB RAS and Design and Technological Institute of Instruments for Geophysics and Ecology SB RAS.

== Activity ==
The Institute has created two devices: EMS Nemfis and Geoviser which collected information about changes in the electrical resistivity of the study area. The instruments can detect disappeared ancient settlements. The equipment were tested in Chichaburg, a hillfort in Zdvinsky District of Novosibirsk Oblast.
