= Terekhov =

Terekhov, Terekhova (Russian: Терехов, Терехова) is a common Russian surname. In Estonian it may be transliterated as Terehhov.

It may refer to:

Men

- Andrey Terekhov (1949–2025), Russian IT developer
- Anton Terekhov (footballer) (born 1998), Russian football player
- Igor Terekhov (born 1970), Russian football player
- Ihor Terekhov (born 1967), Ukrainian politician
- Miguel Terekhov (1928–2012), Uruguayan-born American ballet dancer
- Sergei Yuryevich Terekhov (born 1990), Russian footballer
- Sergei Terehhov (born 1975), Estonian footballer

Women

- Ekaterina Terekhova (born 1987), Russian orienteering competitor
- Elena Terekhova (born 1987), Russian footballer
- Margarita Terekhova (born 1942), Russian film and theatre actress
- Valentina Terekhova, Russian rower

== See also ==
- Tereshkov
