= Igor Terekhov =

Russian footballer

Personal information
- Full name: Igor Ivanovich Terekhov
- Date of birth: 21 February 1970 (age 56)
- Height: 1.81 m (5 ft 11 1/2 in)
- Position: Midfielder

Senior career*
Years	Team	Apps	(Gls)
1991	FC Rossiya Moscow		
1992	FC Lokomotiv Moscow	1	(0)
1992	→ FC Lokomotiv-d Moscow	10	(1)
1995	FC Mosenergo Moscow	13	(0)
1996	FC Luch Vladivostok	0	(0)
2000	FC SDYuShOR Spartak-2 Moscow		
2001	FC Presnya Moscow (amateur)		
2004	FC Zorkiy Krasnogorsk (amateur)		
- * Club domestic league appearances and goals

Igor Ivanovich Terekhov (Russian: Игорь Иванович Терехов; born 21 February 1970) is a former Russian football player.
