= Ulmas Mirsaidov =

Tajikistani chemist

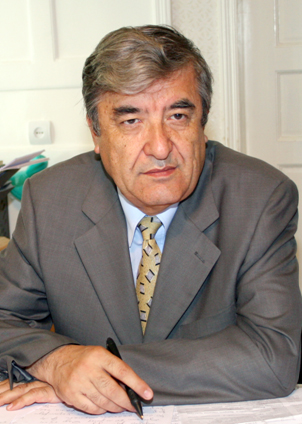
- Born: Mirsaidov Ulmas Mirsaidovich; November 10, 1945 (age 80); Ura-Tyube, Tajikistan

Ulmas Mirsaidovich Mirsaidov (born November 10, 1945) is a Tajik theoretical chemist. He is the Mirsaidov Ulmas Mirsaidovich Professor of Chemistry and the Director of the Nuclear and Radiation Safety Agency, under AS RT.

== Biography ==
Mirsaidov was born in Ura-Tyube, Tajik SSR. In 1967, he graduated with honours from Moscow D.I.Mendeleev Chemical and Technological Institute and was assigned to a job in the Tajik Polytechnic Institute and appointed to a position of assistant at the Chemical technology chair. In 1970, he entered a post graduate course at the I. S. Kurnakov Institute of General and Inorganic Chemistry under USSR AS, and in 1973 he defended a PhD thesis.

== Career ==
Starting in 1973 he worked in the V. I. Nikitin Institute of Chemistry. under AS RT. From 1988 till 2003, he was a director of this institute. The following degrees and titles were awarded: Senior staff scientist on specialty inorganic chemistry 1975, doctor of chemical sciences 1985, professor 1988, corresponding member of the AS 1987, academician of the AS RT 1993. In 1995 he was elected as a president of the AS RT and held this position till 2005. He now works as a Director of Nuclear and Radiation Safety Agency under AS RT.

== Scientific articles ==
Mirsaidov is the author of 450 scientific articles, 15 monographs, 75 inventor's certificates and patents. Under his supervision, 9 doctors of sciences and more than 40 PhD dissertations were defended. He is an in the field of hydrogen compounds chemistry. For the first time in Tajikistan, he started systematic investigations in the field of lightweight metals hydrides and power-consuming substances chemistry. These investigations results made it possible to reveal and justify mechanism, behavior regularity and many reactions directivity.

In his works Prezidenti AN Tajikistana, Sarvaroni fidokori ilm, Oni sostavlyayut slavu tajikskoi nauki and Ustodoni man, well-known scientists' lives are described.

== Scientific and political activities ==
Mirsaidov works carried out between 1970-90 were relevant to aluminum chemistry – potential solid propellant components and hydrogen sources. Mirsaidov's synthesized compounds are used as hydrogen sources, catalyst and selective reducing agents.

Mirsaidov carried out systematic investigation of phase equilibrium in ternary system "non-transient metal borohydride – transient element borohydride – solvent". Based on these investigations, a synthesis method of individual rare earth metals (REM) borohydrides is created which is based on use of more accessible and inexpensive sodium borohydride and sufficiently general. For the first time, in accordance with developed method a whole row of REM borohydrides, their complexes with alkaline metals borohydrides and tetraalkylammonium are derived. Reliability of derived results is confirmed by detailed investigation of physical and chemical properties of dedicated compounds.

Physical and chemical analysis of several systems based on aluminum hydride compounds enabled academician U.M.Mirsaidov to prove existence of complex binary hydride complexes, to carry out simple synthesis method of earlier unknown, or known, but not dedicated in individual condition hepta-, hexa-, and tetrahydroaluminates of alkaline and alkali-earth metals with use of binary hydrides which are more inexpensive and easily accessible sources of hydrogen hydrides.

Original and effective methods of different hydride complexes synthesis are proposed on the basis of systematic investigation of binary hydrides interaction and metals alumohydrides with electron-seeking reagent of different acceptor force (chlorinated reagents, aryl (alkyl) halogenides, boro-, and lithium alumohydride, etc.)

After USSR disintegration Mirsaidov focused the Chemistry Institute on the solution of industry and agricultural problems of Tajikistan. He paid specific attention to problems of industrial residues utilization, local raw stock utilization as initial materials as well as ecological problems of chemical and metallurgical industry. Particularly, under direct supervision of Mirsaidov, the problem of solid wastes dump's utilization of Tajik Aluminum Plant as raw stock for production of metallic aluminum, synthetic iron, ferrosilicium, etc.

Research results of Mirsaidov were tested and introduced with positive conclusions in Isphara hydrometallurgy plant (Tajik SSR) and PA "Navoiazot" (Uzbek SSR) and highly evaluated by USSR AS’ Commission (Vestnik of USSR AS, 1980y.,№9), Interagency Commissions (1976, 1981,1986 yy.) with participation of several customers.

Mirsaidov has been involved in the development of synthesis technology of new substances with specified properties. The staff of department headed by Mirsaidov developed one stage synthesis method of “catalyst” for new techniques needs with expected economic effect 6 million rubles (data from 1990).

Mirsaidov contributed to scientific and organizational activity at the AS RT and Institute of chemistry AS RT. As a president of AS RT he carried out activities on strengthening of research and development base, establishment and development of basic research subdivisions of AS RT. He was director-organizer of Institute of water problems, hydropower engineering and ecology AS RT and Nuclear and Radiation Safety Agency of AS RT.

The Academy of Sciences has agreements and cooperates with more than 50 research centers. With the participation of Mirsaidov, the Academy of Sciences became a member of the following international organizations:

- AASA – Academy of Sciences Association for Asia
- IAAS – International Association of the Academy of Sciences
- TWAS – Third World Academy of Sciences,
- IAP – International Academy Panel
- ICSU – International Council of Scientific Units

With sponsorship of the Ministry of Foreign Affairs and Presidium of AS RT, the Republic of Tajikistan became a member of IAEA – International Atomic Energy Agency, ISTC – International Science and Technology Center. Mirsaidov is the National Contact Point from Tajikistan for these organizations. Many of his students work in different fields of the economy and are at the head of research units.

Mirsaidov was editor-in-chief “Reports of the AS RT” from 1995 till February 2005. Mirsaidov is the founder and leader of a research school on hydrogen energetics. Many large-scale all-USSR events on hydrides chemistry was conducted in Dushanbe (all-USSR conferences 1987, 1991 yy. several others).

Starting from 1991, Mirsaidov was the chair of dissertation council on defending of doctoral and PhD (Candidate of Sciences) dissertations at Institute of Chemistry AS RT. The council has a high priority in the High Attestation Committee of Russian Federation. Up to now more than 40 doctoral and more than 300 PhD (Candidate of Sciences) dissertations in the field of inorganic, organic and physical chemistry are defended in the Council in the area of chemical and technical sciences. Due to Mirsaidov the most required directions as complex reprocessing of mineral raw materials and residues as well as radioecology are developing.

During his presidency of the AS RT, he contributed to the increase of AS RT’s academicians and corresponding-members’ fee. In the AS RT a number of scientists were elected (10 academicians, 37 corresponding-members). In his works “Prezidenti AN Tajikistana”, “Sarvaroni fidokori ilm”, “Oni sostavlyayut slavu tajikskoi nauki” i “Ustodoni man”, scientists’ life and activity are described.

He is a member of several large international organizations and academies.

Under supervision of Mirsaidov, the 50th anniversary of the AS RT was conducted. Delegations from 9 CIS countries participated. Academicians B.E.Paton, N.P.Laverov, J.J.Jenbaev, Vityaz and others appreciated the contribution of Tajik scientists to science.

Mirsaidov delivered lecturers in Tajik Technical University over many years. He was the chair of state examination committees in Tajik State National University and Tajik State Pedagogical University.

In 2005, Mirsaidov was outplaced to the Nuclear and radiation safety agency (NRSA) AS RT – State regulatory authority in the field of radiation protection. As director of NRSA AS RT he strengthens the legislative and regulatory framework. By his direct participation, the parliament of the country adopted the following laws:

- Law on radiation safety
- Law on use of atomic energy

In NRSA AS RT under supervision of Mirsaidov, the basic manufacturing scheme of complex reprocessing of uranic ores and uranium industry residues are developed, effective sorbents for purification of uranic waters are revealed. The radionuclide monitoring of Tajikistan bio-environment is carried out.

By support of international donors he constructed the laboratory building of NRSA AS RT where equipment installation of three laboratories: spectral, calibration and radiochemistry takes place.

Mirsaidov's efforts on effectiveness increase of Technical Cooperation Programs allowed implementation of the projects in nuclear medicine, Republican oncology center modernization, soil erosion identification by the help of radionuclides, carrying out monitoring of Tajikistan’s uranium tailing dumps and re-equipment in SE “Vostokrdemet” laboratory and others.

The high priority of NRSA AS RT allows carrying out large scale international conferences and seminars annually in Dushanbe under the auspices of the IAEA. With the support of International Science and Technology Center (ISTC), international conferences in the field of weapons of mass destruction non-proliferation are carried out (2007, 2010 yy).

Mirsaidov was elected as the Committee Chair of Majlisi Milli – Majlisi Olli (upper House of Parliament) of the Republic of Tajikistan and as the deputy group chair on Dushanbe’s science and education.
