= Tereshkov =

Tereshkov (feminine: Tereshkova) is a Russian surname. Notable people with the surname include:

- Alexey Tereshkov (1893–1960), Soviet general
- Valentina Tereshkova (born 1937), Soviet cosmonaut, first woman in space
- Olga Tereshkova (born 1984), Kazakh former sprinter who specialized in the 400 metres

== See also ==
- Terekhov
