= Tereshkova Street, Novosibirsk =

Street in Novosibirsk, Russia

Tereshkova Street
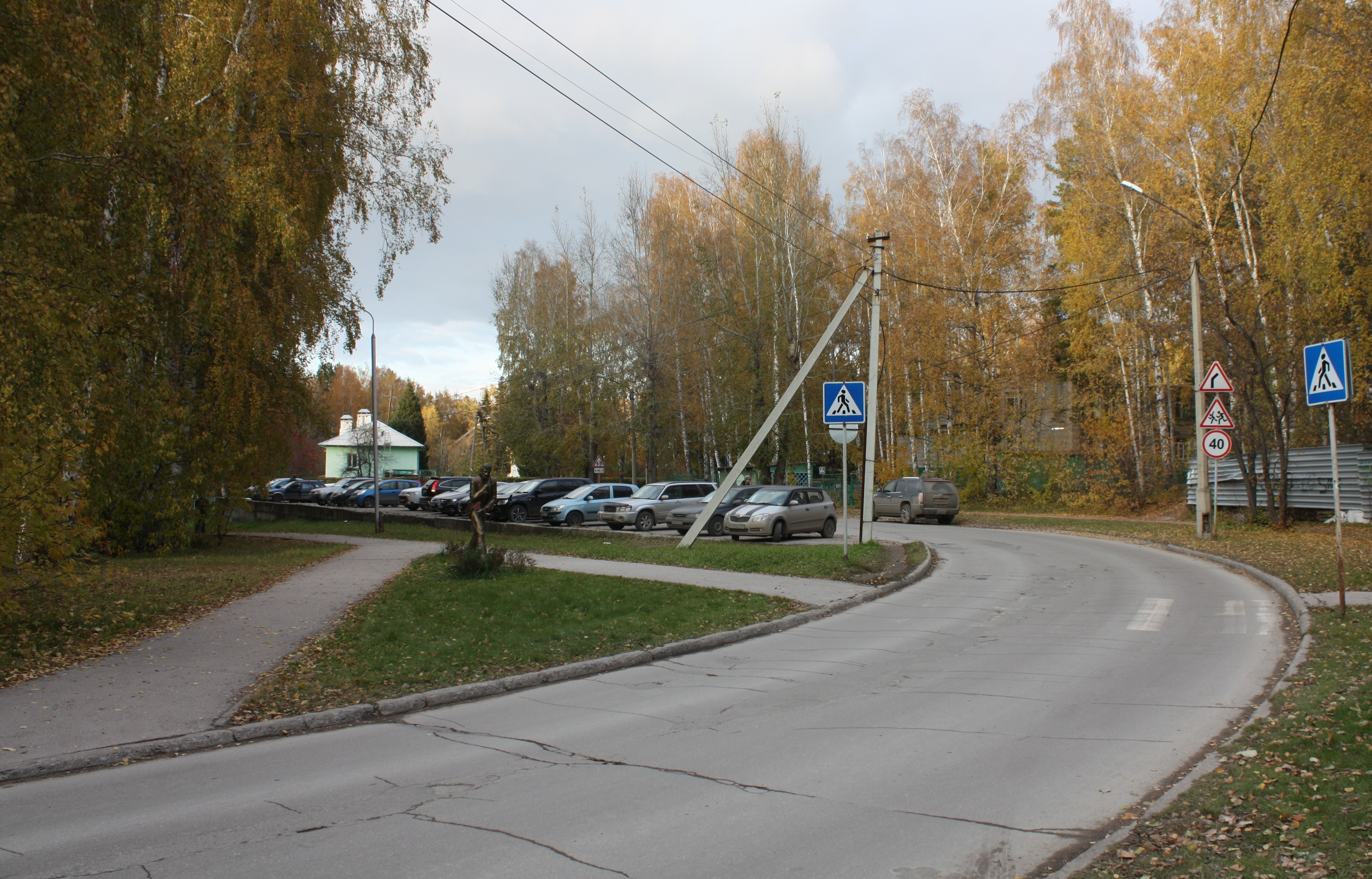
- Native name: Улица Терешковой (Russian)
- Location: Novosibirsk; Russia

Tereshkova Street (Russian: Улица Терешковой) is a street in Akademgorodok of Novosibirsk, Russia.

== History ==
The street was previously called Obvodnaya Street or Romantikov Street.

March 10, 1959, the first tenants moved into the three-story house on the street.

In September 1959, school, kindergarten and dormitory were built on the street.

Scientist Viktor Sharapov recalled that in 1960–1962 the main scientific settlement of Akademgorodok was concentrated in 3 or 4 houses on this street.

In 1964, the street was named after Valentina Tereshkova, the first woman to have flown in space.

== Organizations of SB RAS ==
- Presidium of SB RAS
- Institute Archeology and Ethnography

== Gallery ==
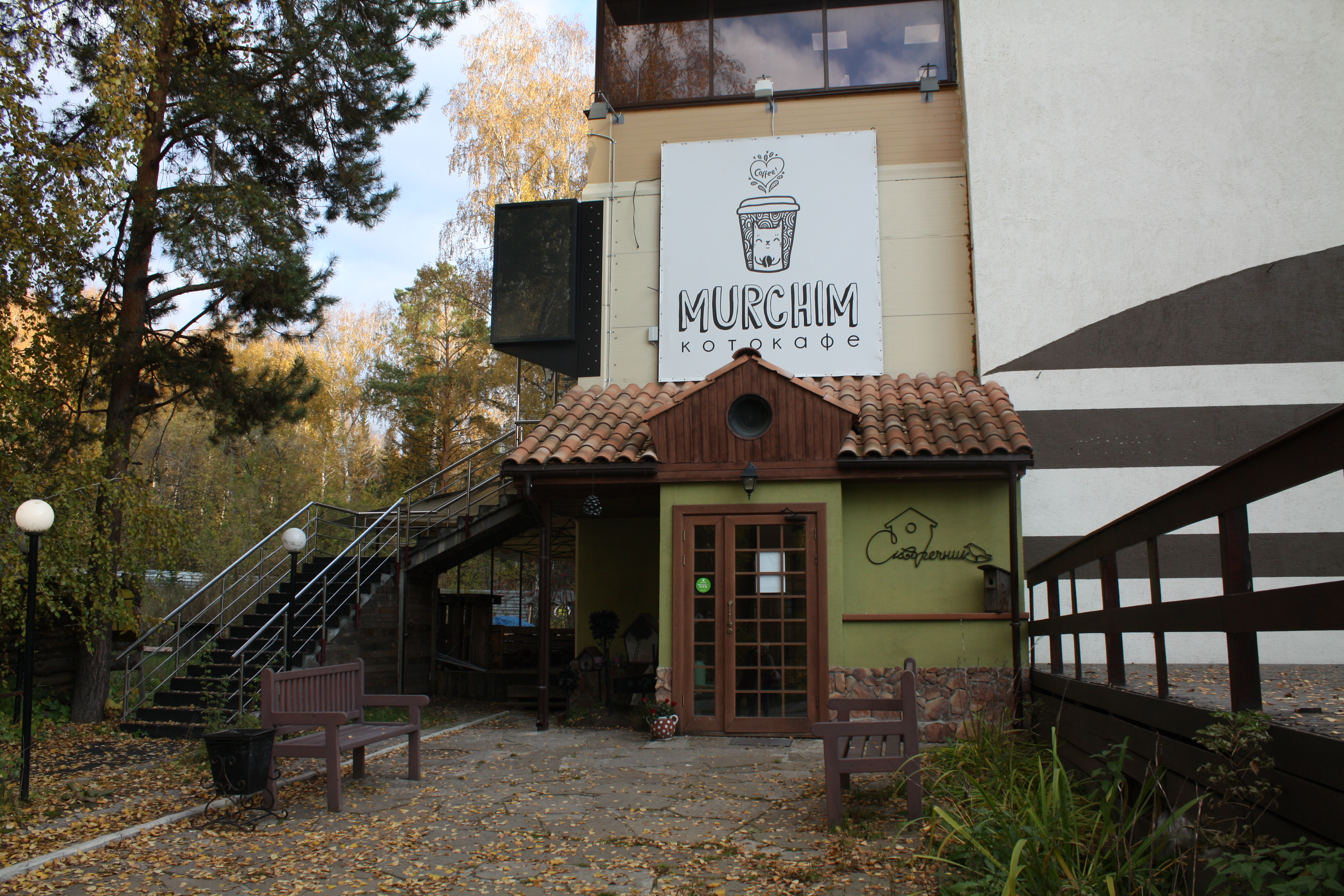

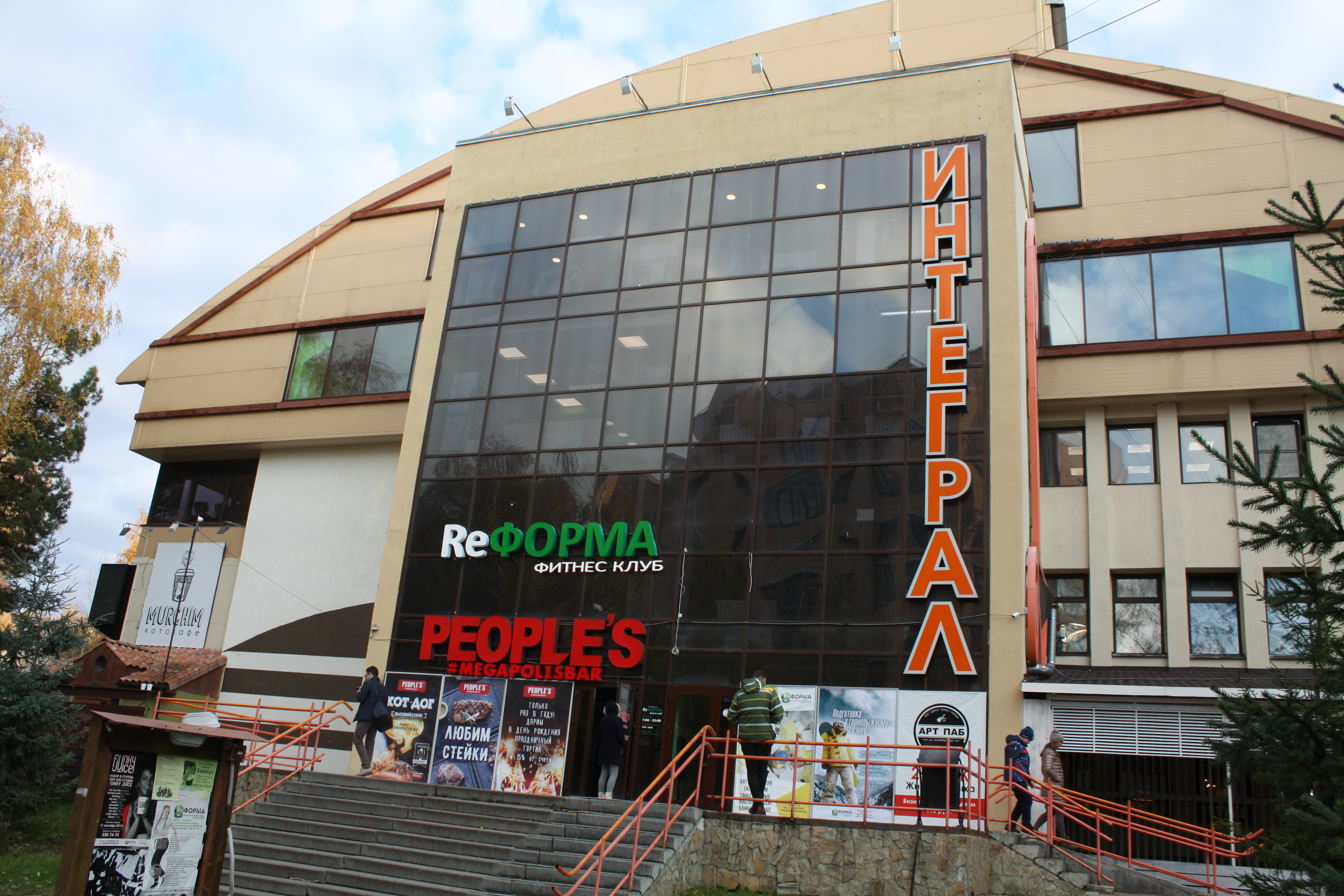

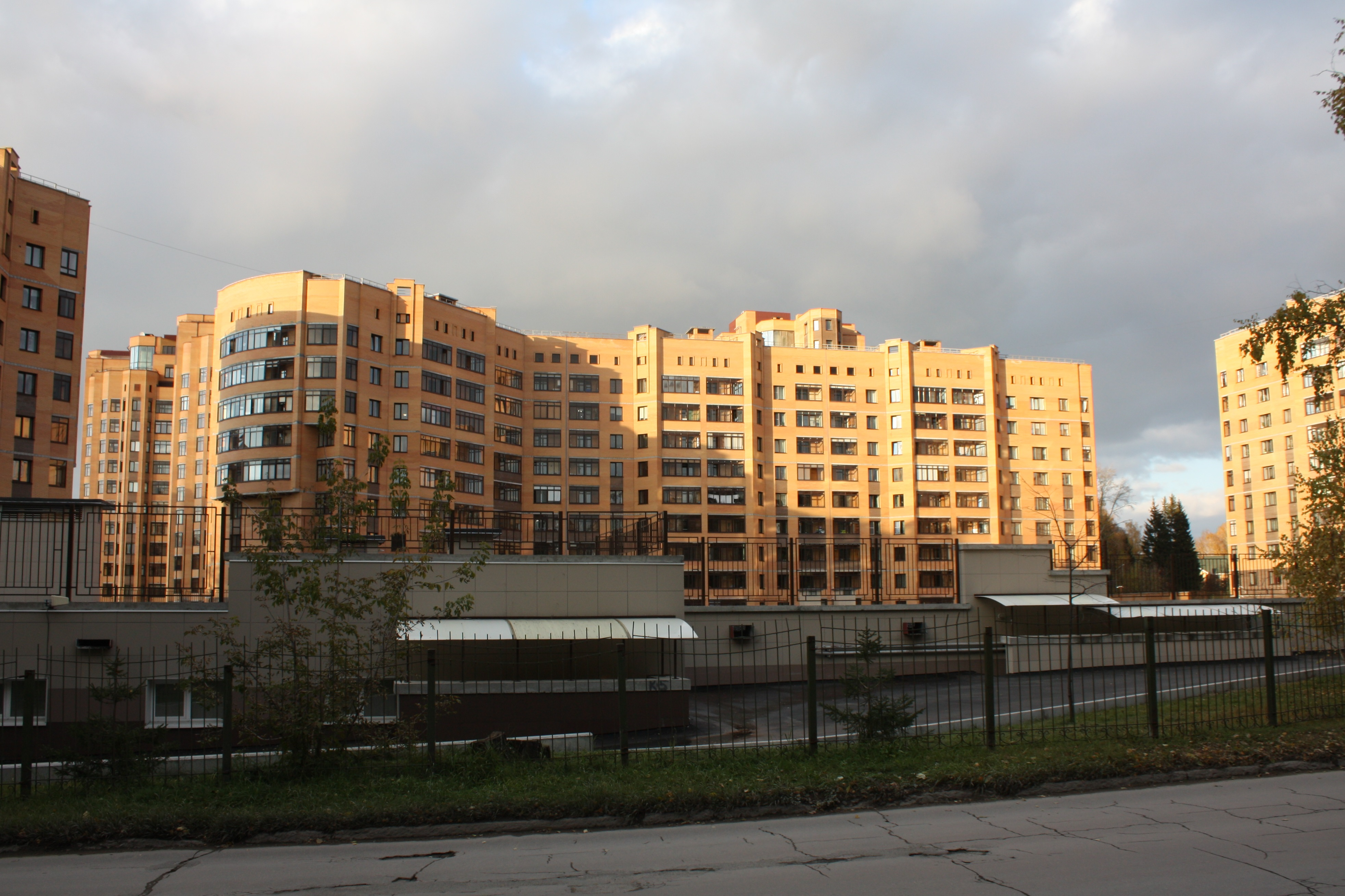

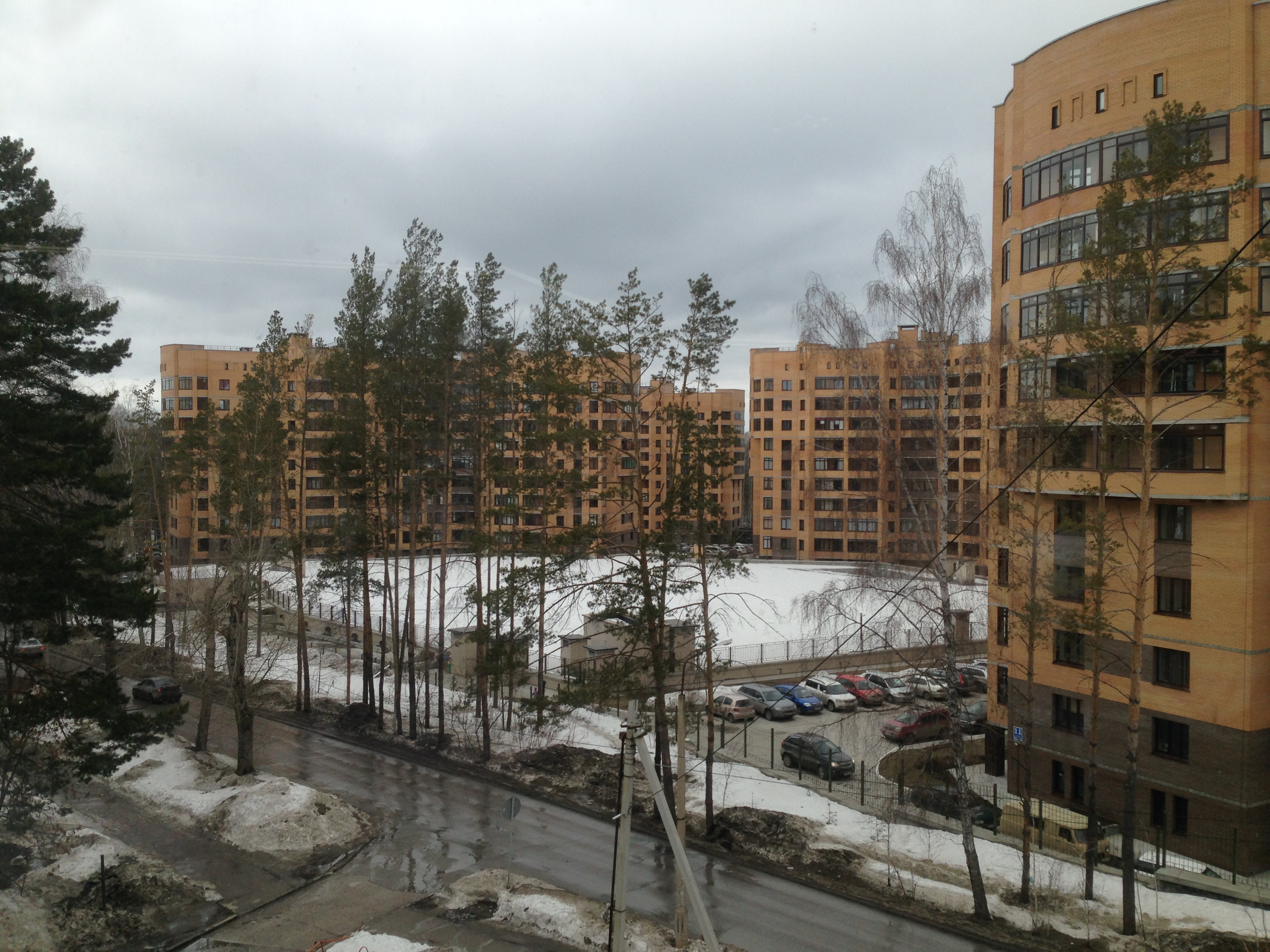

== Notable residents ==
- Pavel Kharlamov (1924–2001) was a Soviet and Ukrainian scientist in the field of mechanics.
- Pelageya Polubarinova-Kochina (1899–1999) was a Soviet and Russian mathematician.
