= Vorozhtsov Novosibirsk Institute of Organic Chemistry =

Research institute in Novosibirsk, Russia

- Established: 1958
- Director: Elena Bagryanskaya
- Owner: Siberian Branch of the Russian Academy of Sciences
- Address: Lavrentyev Prospekt 9, Novosibirsk, 630090, Russia
- Location: Novosibirsk, Russia
- Coordinates: 54.851°N 83.107°E
- Website: web.nioch.nsc.ru

N. N. Vorozhtsov Novosibirsk Institute of Organic Chemistry of the Siberian Branch of Russian Academy of Sciences (Russian: Новосибирский институт органической химии имени Н. Н. Ворожцова СО РАН) is a research institute in Akademgorodok of Novosibirsk, Russia. It was founded in 1958.

== Activities ==
Methods for the synthesis of aromatic, organofluorine, heterocyclic and heteroatomic compounds. Study of properties and formation of organic, hybrid and polymer materials. Study of pharmacological properties and mechanisms of action of biologically active agents of natural and synthetic origin etc.

== Products ==
- Novosil is a stimulant of plant immunity and growth. It is also used in the fight against plant viruses. The product was developed by the Institute together with the Institute of Cytology and Genetics in 1992. It is used in various regions of Russia, as well as in Kazakhstan, Belarus, Ukraine and Georgia.
- Acrylate-siloxane hybrid monomer is a material with the addition of silicon. It can be used to create microcircuits.
