= 2010 in Russia =

- Decades: 1990s; 2000s; 2010s; 2020s
- See also: History of Russia; Timeline of Russian history; List of years in Russia

The following lists some of the events from the year 2010 in Russia.

== Incumbents ==
- President: Dmitry Medvedev
- Prime Minister: Vladimir Putin

=== Governors ===
- Amur Oblast: Oleg Kozhemyako (ER)
- Arkhangelsk Oblast: Ilya Mikhalchuk (ER)
- Astrakhan Oblast: Alexander Zhilkin (ER)
- Belgorod Oblast: Yevgeny Savchenko (ER)
- Bryansk Oblast: Nikolay Denin (ER)
- Chelyabinsk Oblast: Pyotr Sumin (until April 22, ER), Mikhail Yurevich (starting April 22, ER)
- Irkutsk Oblast: Dmitry Mezentsev (ER)
- Ivanovo Oblast: Mikhail Men (ER)
- Kaliningrad Oblast: Georgy Boos (until September 28, ER), Nikolay Tsukanov (starting September 28, ER)
- Kaluga Oblast: Anatoly Artamonov (ER)
- Kemerovo Oblast: Aman Tuleyev (ER)
- Kirov Oblast: Nikita Belykh (Independent)
- Kostroma Oblast: Igor Slyunyayev (ER)
- Kurgan Oblast: Oleg Bogomolov (ER)
- Kursk Oblast: Aleksandr Mikhailov (ER)
- Leningrad Oblast: Valery Serdyukov (ER)
- Lipetsk Oblast: Oleg Korolyov (ER)
- Magadan Oblast: Nikolai Dudov (ER)
- Moscow Oblast: Boris Gromov (ER)
- Murmansk Oblast: Dmitry Dmitrienko (ER)
- Nizhny Novgorod Oblast: Valery Shantsev (ER)
- Novgorod Oblast: Sergey Mitin (ER)
- Novosibirsk Oblast: Viktor Tolokonsky (until September 9, ER), Vasily Yurchenko (starting September 22, ER)
- Omsk Oblast: Leonid Polezhayev (ER)
- Orenburg Oblast: Alexey Chernyshev (until June 15, ER), Yury Berg (starting June 15, ER)
- Oryol Oblast: Alexander Kozlov (ER)
- Penza Oblast: Vasily Bochkarev (ER)
- Pskov Oblast: Andrey Turchak (ER)
- Rostov Oblast: Vladimir Chub (until June 14, ER), Vasily Golubev (starting June 14, ER)
- Ryazan Oblast: Oleg Kovalyov (ER)
- Sakhalin Oblast: Alexander Khoroshavin (ER)
- Samara Oblast: Vladimir Artemyakov (ER)
- Saratov Oblast: Pavel Ipatov (ER)
- Smolensk Oblast: Sergey Antufyev (ER)
- Tambov Oblast: Oleg Betin (ER)
- Tomsk Oblast: Viktor Kress (ER)
- Tula Oblast: Vyacheslav Dudka (ER)
- Tver Oblast: Dmitry Zelenin (ER)
- Tyumen Oblast: Vladimir Yakushev (ER)
- Ulyanovsk Oblast: Sergey Morozov (ER)
- Vladimir Oblast: Nikolay Vinogradov (CPRF)
- Volgograd Oblast: Anatoly Brovko (ER)
- Vologda Oblast: Vyacheslav Pozgalyov (ER)
- Voronezh Oblast: Alexey Gordeyev (ER)
- Yaroslavl Oblast: Sergey Vakhrukov (ER)
- Jewish Autonomous Oblast: Nikolay Volkov (until February 25, ER), Alexander Vinnikov (starting February 25, ER)

== Events ==
- Deputies voted to issue the 2010 Kharkiv Pact, a treaty where Russian lease on naval facilities in Crimea would be extended to 2042.
- Raspadskaya mine explosion occurred on 8 May 2010.
- In late July 2010, Russian wildfires broke out in Russia. The fires mainly hit European Russia, but they also hit other parts of Russia. In total, the wild fires caused 55790 deaths (54 in wildfires and 55,736 in heat waves).
- 2010 Chechen Parliament attack took place on October 19. At least six people were killed, including two police officers, one parliament employee and all three suicide commandos.
- 2011 Russian Figure Skating Championships took place from December 26–29, 2010, and from February 2–4, 2011.
- 2010 World Rhythmic gymnastics Championships took place from September 20 to 26.

== Deaths ==
=== January ===
- January 9 - Yevgeny Paladiev, a Soviet-born Kazakh ice hockey player, age 61.
- January 11 - Georgy Garanian, a Russian jazz saxophonist and bandleader, died of cardiac arrest, age 75.
- January 19 - Vladimir Karpov, a Russian writer and Chairman of the USSR Union of Writers (1986–1991), age 87.
- January 24 - Leonid Nechayev, a Russian film director, died of a stroke, age 70.

=== February ===
- February 8 - Anna Samokhina, a Russian actress, died from stomach cancer, age 47.
- February 10 - Eduard Vinokurov, a Russian Olympic fencer (1968, 1972, 1976), age 67.

=== March ===
- March 1 - Tatyana Dmitrieva, a Russian psychiatrist and politician, minister of health (1996–1998), age 58.
- March 18 - Konstantin Yeryomenko, Russian futsal player, died from a heart attack on, age 39.
- March 27 - Vasily Smyslov Russian chess grandmaster and World Champion (1957–1958), died from heart failure, age 89.

=== April ===
- April 1 - Yuri Maslyukov, a Russian politician and Vice Premier of Soviet Union (1988–1990) and Russia (1998–1999), age 72.
- April 3 - Oleg Kopayev, a Russian footballer, Soviet Top League top scorer (1963, 1965), age 72.
- April 6 -Anatoly Dobrynin, Russian diplomat and politician, died age 90.
- April 23 - Natalia Lavrova, Olympic gold medalist (2000, 2004), died in a car accident, age 25.

=== May ===
- May 9 - Zosima Davydov, a Russian Orthodox prelate, bishop of Yakutsk and Lensk (since 2004), died of a heart attack, age 46.
- May 30 - Yuri Chesnokov, Russian Olympic gold medal-winning (1964) volleyball player, died age 77.

=== June ===
- June 9 - Marina Semyonova, Russian prima ballerina (Bolshoi Ballet), age 101.

=== July ===
- July 6 - Igor Misko, a Russian ice hockey player (SKA Saint Petersburg), dies of cardiac arrest age 23.
- July 16 - Aleksandr Boloshev, Russian Soviet basketball player, 1972 Olympic gold medalist, died from a stroke, age 63.

=== August ===
- August 5 -Yuri Shishlov, a Russian football coach dies age 65.

=== September ===
- September 10 - Fridrikh Maryutin, Russian Olympic footballer dies age 85.
- September 12 - Antonina Pirozhkova, civil engineer and writer dies aged 101.
- September 24 - Gennady Yanayev, Vice President of the USSR (1990–1991), died from lung cancer, age 73.

=== October ===
- October 1 – Georgy Arbatov, a Russian political scientist dies age 87.
- October 25 – Valentina Gaganova, textile worker and politician, died age 78.

=== November ===
- November 3 - Viktor Chernomyrdin, Prime Minister (1992–1998), died from cancer at age 72.

=== December ===
- December 7 – Tatyana Komarova, journalist, died from acute renal failure, aged 58.
- December 29 - Pavel Kolchin, Russian Olympic gold (1956) and bronze (1956, 1964) medal-winning cross-country skier, died age 80.

== See also ==
- List of Russian films of 2010
- 2010 Russia – United States prisoner swap
