= 2024 Murmansk Oblast gubernatorial election =

- 7–8 September 2024
- Turnout: 41.55%
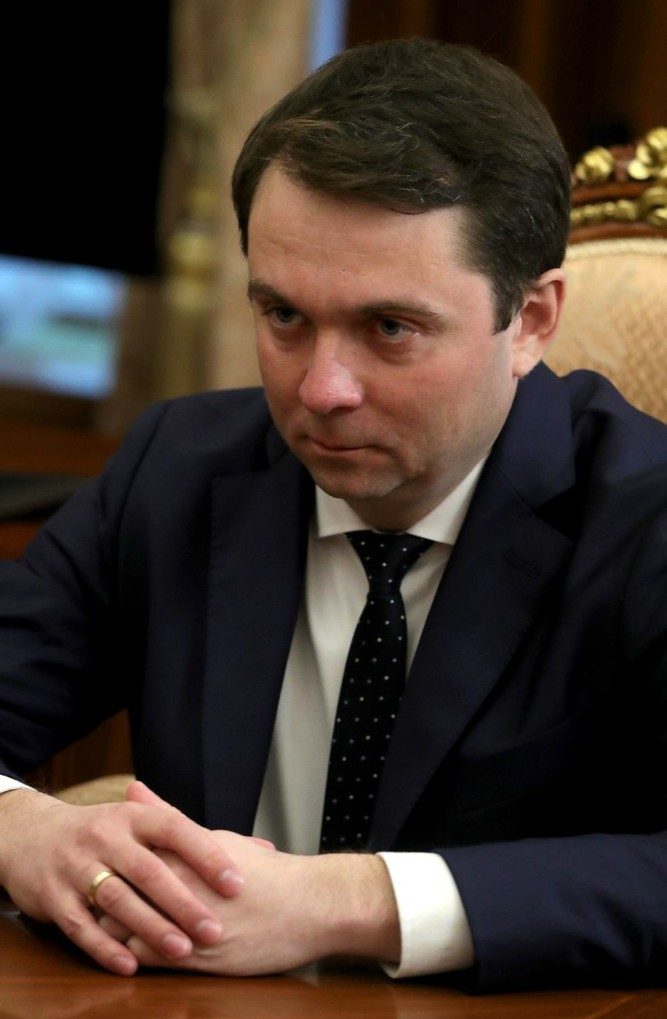
		CPRF	LDPR
Candidate	Andrey Chibis	Yury Vatalin	Stanislav Gontar
Party	United Russia	CPRF	LDPR
Popular vote	167,647	32,971	15,539
Percentage	73.99%	14.55%	6.86%
Governor before election
Andrey Chibis
United Russia
Governor-elect
Andrey Chibis
United Russia

The 2024 Murmansk Oblast gubernatorial election took place on 7–8 September 2024, on common election day. Incumbent Governor Andrey Chibis was re-elected to a second term in office.

== Background ==
Second-term Governor of Murmansk Oblast Marina Kovtun announced her resignation in March 2019, citing personal reasons. Initially Deputy Minister of Energy Aleksey Teksler was expected to be appointed acting Governor of Murmansk Oblast, however, two days prior to Kovtun's resignation Teksler was appointed acting Governor of Chelyabinsk Oblast. Then-Deputy Minister of Construction, Housing and Utilities and Federal Chief Housing Inspector Andrey Chibis was appointed as Kovtun's replacement.

Chibis ran for a full term nominated by United Russia and won the September 2019 election with 60.07% of the vote against five opponents, including Murmansk Oblast Duma members Maksim Belov (LDPR, 18.27%) and Mikhail Antropov (CPRF, 11.38%), former Apatity mayor. Despite the overwhelming margin of victory (nearly 42 points), it was the third closest gubernatorial election that cycle.

On April 4, 2024, Governor Chibis was attacked and stabbed by a lone assailant after a town hall meeting in Apatity. Chibis survived the attack and was rushed to a hospital in Murmansk for treatment of his injuries, while his deputy Nadezhda Aksenova served as acting Governor of Murmansk Oblast until Chibis's recovery. Two weeks later, on April 18, 2024, Chibis returned to office and the same day held a call with President Vladimir Putin, where the governor expressed his intention to seek a second term and received Putin's endorsement.

== Candidates ==
In Murmansk Oblast candidates for Governor can be nominated by registered political parties or by self-nomination. Candidate for Governor of Murmansk Oblast should be a Russian citizen and at least 30 years old. Candidates for Governor should not have a foreign citizenship or residence permit. Each candidate in order to be registered is required to collect at least 7% of signatures of members and heads of municipalities. In addition, self-nominated candidates should collect 0.5% of signatures of Murmansk Oblast residents. Also gubernatorial candidates present 3 candidacies to the Federation Council and election winner later appoints one of the presented candidates.

=== Declared ===
Candidate name, political party		Occupation	Status	Ref.
Andrey Chibis; United Russia	Andrey Chibis	Incumbent Governor of Murmansk Oblast (2019–present)	Registered	
Stanislav Gontar; Liberal Democratic Party		Member of Murmansk Oblast Duma (2021–present)	Registered	
Yury Klimchenko; Party of Pensioners		Pensioner	Registered	
Yury Vatalin; Communist Party		Former Member of Murmansk Oblast Duma (2012–2016)	Registered	
Karib Gadzhimagomedov; Independent		Former construction businessman 2019 gubernatorial candidate	Did not file	

=== Eliminated at convention ===
- Vladimir Mishchenko (United Russia), First Deputy Chairman of the Murmansk Oblast Duma (2016–present), Member of the Oblast Duma (2011–present)
- Svetlana Videneyeva (United Russia), Chief of Staff of the Murmansk Oblast Duma (2022–present)

=== Declined ===
- Artur Popov (CPRF), Member of Murmansk Oblast Duma (2021–present)

=== Candidates for Federation Council ===
Incumbent Senator Konstantin Dolgov (Independent) was not renominated.

Gubernatorial candidate, political party	Candidates for Federation Council	Status
Andrey Chibis; United Russia	* Yelena Dyagileva, Deputy Governor of Murmansk Oblast (2019–present) * Andrey Kulba, Deputy Head of the Control Department of the Presidential Administration of Russia * Olga Kuznetsova, Deputy Governor of Murmansk Oblast (2018–present)	Registered
Stanislav Gontar; Liberal Democratic Party	* Nelli Shayduko, aide to Murmansk Oblast Duma member * Irina Sologub, aide to Murmansk Oblast Duma member * Konstantin Zamyatin, IT businessman	Registered
Yury Klimchenko; Party of Pensioners	* Igor Naydyonov, former Member of Murmansk Oblast Duma (2011–2021) * Irina Shevchuk, nonprofit specialist * Anna Volotskova, nonprofit specialist	Registered
Yury Vatalin; Communist Party	* Mikhail Antropov, former Member of Murmansk Oblast Duma (1997–2004, 2011–2021), 2014 and 2019 gubernatorial candidate * Aleksandr Klementyev, Member of Murmansk Oblast Duma (2021–present) * Aleksandr Makarevich (SR–ZP), Member of Murmansk Oblast Duma (2007–present), 2014 gubernatorial candidate	Registered

== Finances ==
All sums are in rubles.

Financial Report	Source	Chibis	Gontar	Klimchenko	Vatalin
First		50,000,000	500,000	100,000	45,000
Final		66,000,000	1,000,000	40,100,000	2,270,000

== Results ==
Summary of the 7–8 September 2024 Murmansk Oblast gubernatorial election results
Candidate	Party	Votes	%
Andrey Chibis (incumbent)	United Russia	167,647	73.99
Yury Vatalin	Communist Party	32,971	14.55
Stanislav Gontar	Liberal Democratic Party	15,539	6.86
Yury Klimchenko	Party of Pensioners	6,245	2.76
Valid votes		222,402	98.17
Blank ballots		4,149	1.83
Total		226,551	100.00
Turnout		226,551	41.55
Registered voters		545,267	100.00

Governor Chibis appointed Deputy Governor Yelena Dyagileva (Independent) to the Federation Council, replacing incumbent Senator Konstantin Dolgov (Independent).

== See also ==
- 2024 Russian regional elections
