= 2023 Novosibirsk Oblast gubernatorial election =

- 8–10 September 2023
- Turnout: 31.84%
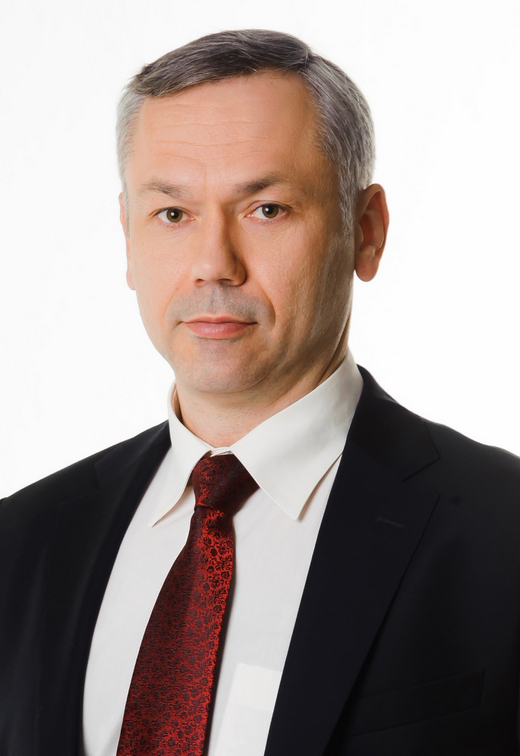
		CPRF	LDPR
Candidate	Andrey Travnikov	Roman Yakovlev	Yevgeny Lebedev
Party	United Russia	CPRF	LDPR
Popular vote	526,284	74,515	49,602
Percentage	75.72%	10.72%	7.14%
Governor before election
Andrey Travnikov
United Russia
Governor-elect
Andrey Travnikov
United Russia

The 2023 Novosibirsk Oblast gubernatorial election took place on 8–10 September 2023, on common election day. Incumbent governor Andrey Travnikov was re-elected to a second term in office.

== Background ==
Mayor of Vologda Andrey Travnikov was appointed acting Governor of Novosibirsk Oblast in October 2017, replacing first-term governor Vladimir Gorodetsky, who resigned early at his own request. Travnikov won the following gubernatorial election in September 2018 with 64.5% of the vote. Newly elected governor Travnikov also appointed Gorodetsky, his predecessor, to the Federation Council.

In December 2022 Governor Travnikov announced that he had made a decision about running for a second term in office, however, he declined to publicly disclose it. Several gubernatorial candidates were mentioned as Travnikov's potential replacements, including State Duma members Dmitry Savelyev, Viktor Ignatov and Oleg Ivaninsky, Legislative Assembly of Novosibirsk Oblast Speaker Andrey Shimkiv, vice governors Vladimir Znatkov and Yury Petukhov, and even Communist Mayor of Novosibirsk Anatoly Lokot. In April 2023 Andrey Travnikov announced his intention to run for reelection, and two weeks later he received support for his campaign from President Vladimir Putin.

== Candidates ==
In Novosibirsk Oblast candidates for governor can be nominated only by registered political parties; self-nomination is not possible. However, candidates are not obliged to be members of the nominating party. Candidate for Governor of Novosibirsk Oblast should be a Russian citizen and at least 30 years old. Candidates for governor should not have a foreign citizenship or residence permit. Each candidate in order to be registered is required to collect at least 7% of signatures of members and heads of municipalities. Also gubernatorial candidates present 3 candidacies to the Federation Council and election winner later appoints one of the presented candidates.

=== Registered ===
- Yevgeny Lebedev (LDPR), Deputy Chairman of the Novosibirsk Council of Deputies (2020–present)
- Vladislav Plotnikov (SR–ZP), businessman
- Andrey Travnikov (United Russia), incumbent Governor of Novosibirsk Oblast (2017–present)
- Roman Yakovlev (CPRF), Member of Legislative Assembly of Novosibirsk Oblast (2015–present)

=== Did not file ===
- Andrey Shchukin (Communists of Russia), first secretary of CPCR regional office, former Deputy Chairman of the Government of Altai Krai (2017–2018), 2014 Altai Krai LDPR gubernatorial candidate

=== Declined ===
- Aleksandr Aksyonenko (SR–ZP), Member of State Duma (2021–present)
- Natalya Chubykina (Yabloko), chairwoman of Yabloko regional office
- Vera Ganzya (CPRF), former Member of State Duma (2014–2021)
- Vyacheslav Ilyukhin (Rodina), Member of Legislative Assembly of Novosibirsk Oblast (2020–present)
- Darya Karaseva (New People), Member of Legislative Assembly of Novosibirsk Oblast (2020–present)
- Eduard Kozhemyakin (RPPSS), former Member of Novosibirsk Council of Deputies (2005–2020) (endorsed Travnikov)
- Natalya Krasovskaya (LDPR), Deputy Chairman of the Legislative Assembly of Novosibirsk Oblast (2020–present)
- Anatoly Kubanov (SR–ZP), Deputy Chairman of the Legislative Assembly of Novosibirsk Oblast (2020–present), Member of Legislative Assembly (2005–present), 2014 and 2018 gubernatorial candidate
- Anatoly Lokot (CPRF), Mayor of Novosibirsk (2014–present), former Member of State Duma (2003–2014)
- Sergey Shilov (SR–ZP), businessman
- Renat Suleymanov (CPRF), Member of State Duma (2021–present)
- Andrey Zhirnov (CPRF), former Member of Legislative Assembly of Novosibirsk Oblast (2005–2020)

=== Candidates for Federation Council ===
- Vladislav Plotnikov (SR–ZP):
  - Aleksandr Aksyonenko, Member of State Duma (2021–present)
  - Ivan Bocharov, Member of Kolyvansky District Council of Deputies (2015–present)
  - Sergey Shilov, businessman
- Andrey Travnikov (United Russia):
  - Vladimir Gorodetsky, incumbent Senator from Novosibirsk Oblast (2018–present)
  - Andrey Panfyorov, First Deputy Chairman of the Legislative Assembly of Novosibirsk Oblast (2015–present), Member of Legislative Assembly (2005–present)
  - Larisa Pozdnyakova, chief infectious disease specialist of Novosibirsk Oblast
- Roman Yakovlev (CPRF):
  - Aleksandr Burmistrov, Member of Novosibirsk Council of Deputies (2015–present)
  - Vera Ganzya, former Member of State Duma (2014–2021)
  - Andrey Zhirnov, former Member of Legislative Assembly of Novosibirsk Oblast (2005–2020)

== Finances ==
All sums are in rubles.

Financial Report	Source	Lebedev	Plotnikov	Shchukin	Travnikov	Yakovlev
First		295,000	8,155,000	0	34,150,000	4,678,710
Final		2,690,000	25,005,000	0	50,650,000	9,888,141

== Polls ==
Fieldwork date	Polling firm	Travnikov	Lebedev	Yakovlev	Plotnikov	None	Lead
30–31 August 2023	INSOMAR	69%	13%	10%	6%	2%	56%

== Results ==
Summary of the 8–10 September 2023 Novosibirsk Oblast gubernatorial election results
Candidate	Party	Votes	%
Andrey Travnikov (incumbent)	United Russia	526,284	75.72
Roman Yakovlev	Communist Party	74,515	10.72
Yevgeny Lebedev	Liberal Democratic Party	49,602	7.14
Vladislav Plotnikov	A Just Russia — For Truth	30,183	4.34
Valid votes		680,584	97.92
Blank ballots		14,422	2.08
Total		695,006	100.00
Turnout		695,006	31.84
Registered voters		2,182,763	100.00

Governor Travnikov re-appointed incumbent Senator Vladimir Gorodetsky to the Federation Council.

== See also ==
- 2023 Russian regional elections
