= 2025 Novosibirsk Oblast legislative election =

Regional legislative election in Russia

← 2020	12–14 September 2025	2030 →

All 76 seats in the Legislative Assembly 39 seats needed for a majority
- Turnout: 33.02% ▲4.77 pp
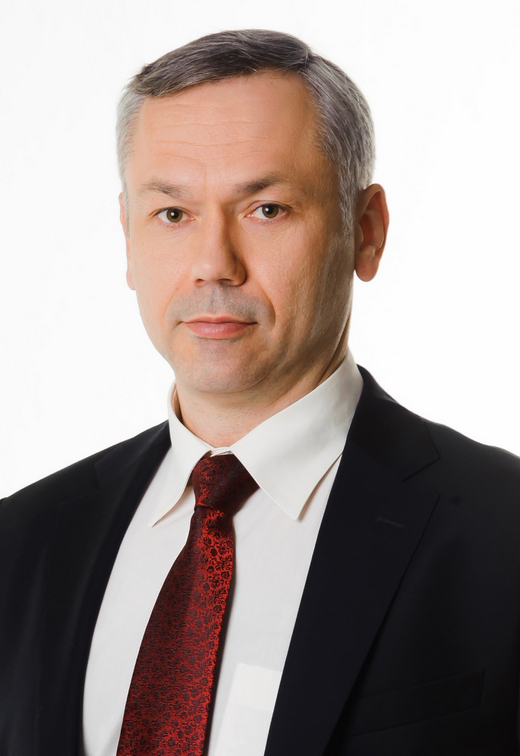

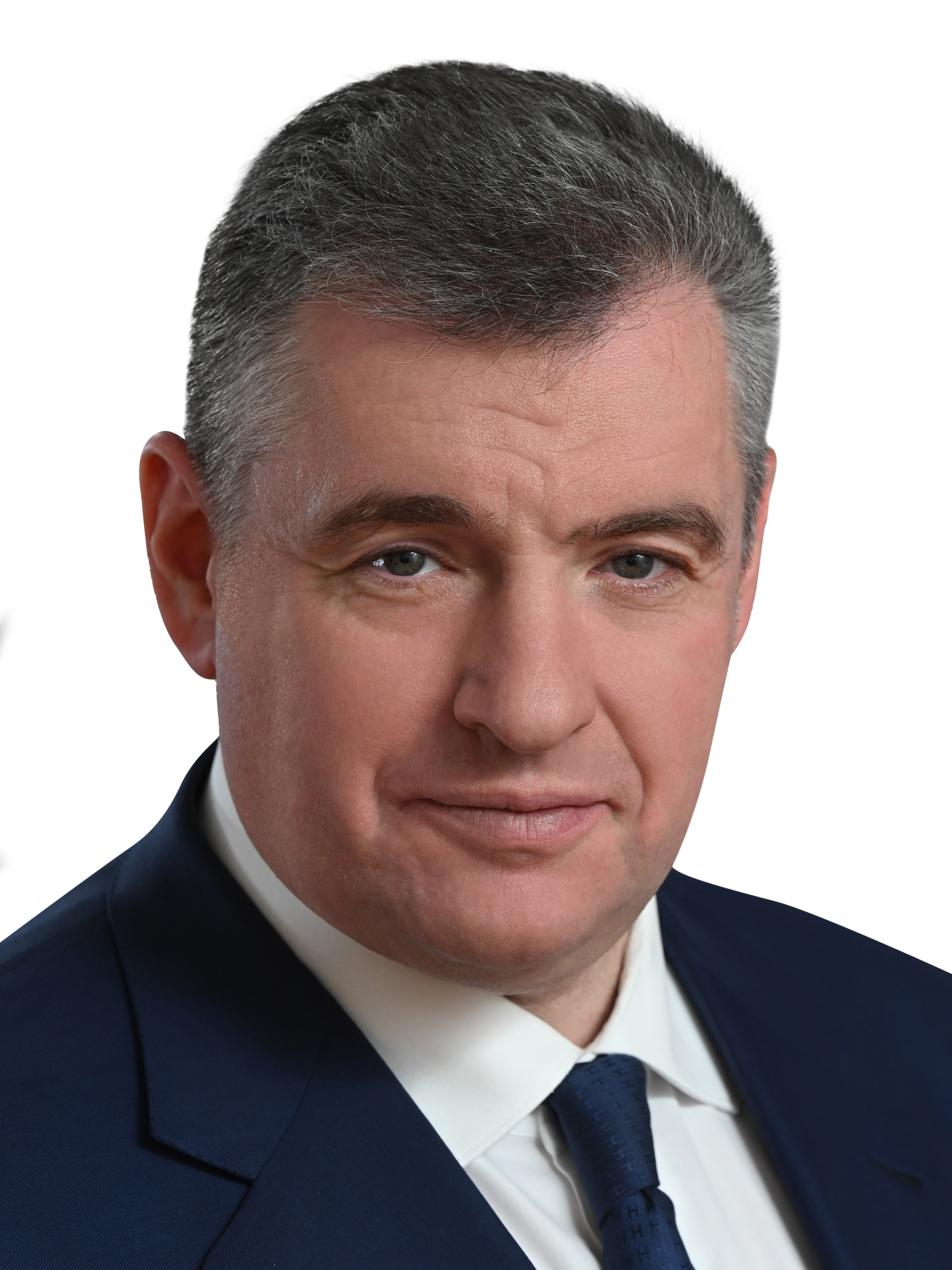

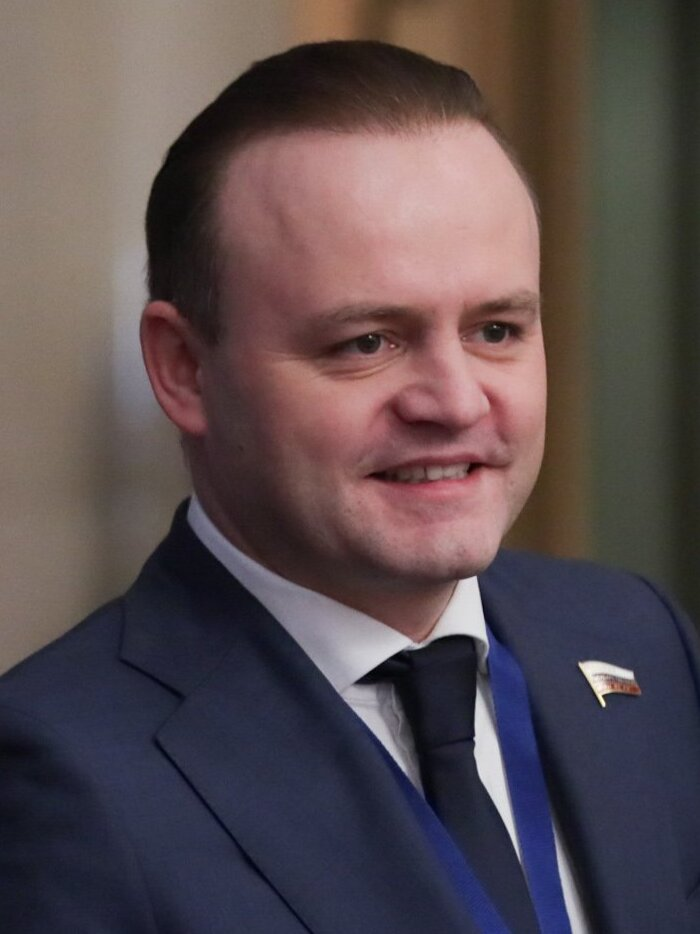

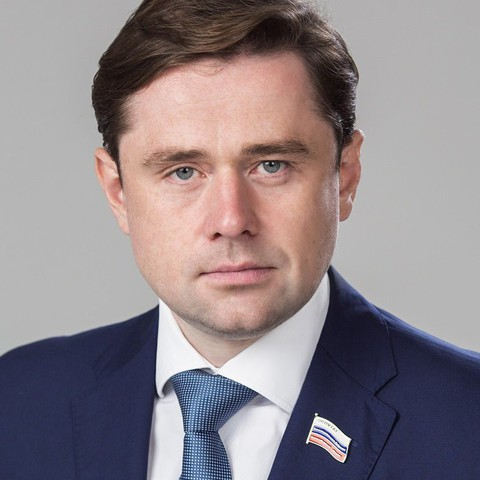
	Majority party	Minority party	Third party
		CPRF
Candidate	Andrey Travnikov	Vladimir Karpov	Leonid Slutsky
Party	United Russia	CPRF	LDPR
Last election	38.13%, 44 seats	16.63%, 14 seats	13.58%, 6 seats
Seats won	51	10	4
Seat change	▲7	▼4	▼2
Popular vote	375,374	81,066	67,452
Percentage	51.91%	11.21%	9.33%
Swing	▲13.78 pp	▼5.42 pp	▼4.25 pp
	Fourth party	Fifth party	Sixth party
			RPPSS
Candidate	Vladislav Davankov	Alexander Aksyonenko	Vladimir Vorozhtsov
Party	New People	SR–ZP	Party of Pensioners
Last election	6.92%, 3 seats	6.12%, 2 seats	5.69%, 2 seats
Seats won	4	4	2
Seat change	▲1	▲2	Steady
Popular vote	57,220	56,292	47,961
Percentage	7.91%	7.78%	6.63%
Swing	▲0.99 pp	▲1.66 pp	▲0.94 pp
Chairman before election
Andrey Shimkiv
United Russia
Elected Chairman
Andrey Shimkiv
United Russia

The 2025 Legislative Assembly of Novosibirsk Oblast election took place on 12–14 September 2025. All 76 seats in the Legislative Assembly were up for re-election.

United Russia increased its already overwhelming majority in the Legislative Assembly, winning 51.9% of the vote and 29 of 38 single-mandate constituencies. Communist Party of the Russian Federation lost almost a third of its vote share and four seats but retained the second largest faction with 10 deputies. Liberal Democratic Party of Russia also lost 4 pp. and two of its six deputies after its entire faction defected to United Russia. New People and A Just Russia – For Truth both made gains in the Legislative Assembly, increasing its factions by one and two deputies respectively.

== Electoral system ==
Under current election laws, the Legislative Assembly is elected for a term of five years, with parallel voting. 38 seats are elected by party-list proportional representation with a 5% electoral threshold, with the other half elected in 38 single-member constituencies by first-past-the-post voting. Seats in the proportional part are allocated using the Imperiali quota, modified to ensure that every party list, which passes the threshold, receives at least one mandate.

== Candidates ==
=== Party lists ===
To register regional lists of candidates, parties need to collect 0.5% of signatures of all registered voters in Novosibirsk Oblast.

The following parties were relieved from the necessity to collect signatures:

- United Russia
- Communist Party of the Russian Federation
- Liberal Democratic Party of Russia
- A Just Russia — Patriots — For Truth
- New People
- Russian Party of Pensioners for Social Justice
- Rodina
- Russian Ecological Party "The Greens"

№	Party	Oblast-wide list	Candidates	Territorial groups	Status
1	A Just Russia – For Truth	Alexander Aksyonenko • Ruslan Kolnik • Roman Sivak	97	25	Registered
2	Liberal Democratic Party	Leonid Slutsky • Anna Tereshkova • Aleksandr Boyko	75	19	Registered
3	New People	Vladislav Davankov • Darya Karaseva • Ilya Polyakov	152	38	Registered
4	The Greens	Yekaterina Pisetskaya	39	13	Registered
5	Party of Pensioners	Vladimir Vorozhtsov • Aleksandr Averkin • Sergey Kondratyev	69	18	Registered
6	Rodina	Vyacheslav Ilyukhin • Konstantin Antonov • Leonid Rybin	65	16	Registered
7	Communist Party	Vladimir Karpov • Nikolay Mashkarin • Roman Yakovlev	59	14	Registered
8	United Russia	Andrey Travnikov • Aleksandr Karelin • Andrey Shimkiv	155	38	Registered

For Truth and Party of Growth, which participated in the last election, have been dissolved since.

=== Single-mandate constituencies ===
38 single-mandate constituencies were formed in Novosibirsk Oblast. To register candidates in single-mandate constituencies need to collect 3% of signatures of registered voters in the constituency.

Number of candidates in single-mandate constituencies
Party	Candidates	
Party	Nominated	Registered
United Russia	36	36
Communist Party	36	34
Liberal Democratic Party	37	35
New People	33	33
A Just Russia – For Truth	36	34
Party of Pensioners	25	23
Rodina	2	2
Independent	9	1
Total	214	198

== Polls ==
Fieldwork date	Polling firm	UR	CPRF	LDPR	NL	SR-ZP	RPPSS	Rodina	Greens
14 September 2025	2025 election	51.9	11.2	9.3	7.9	7.8	6.6	1.1	0.9
1–4 September 2025	Russian Field	45.9	13.4	13.0	11.4	5.7	7.0	0.6	1.8
13 September 2020	2020 election	38.1	16.6	13.6	6.9	6.1	5.7	3.2	2.6

== Results ==
=== Results by party lists ===
Summary of the 12–14 September 2025 Legislative Assembly of Novosibirsk Oblast election results
Party	Party list					Constituency		Total	
Party	Votes	%	±pp	Seats	+/–	Seats	+/–	Seats	+/–
United Russia	375,374	51.91	▲13.78	22	▲5	29	▲2	51	▲7
Communist Party	81,066	11.21	▼5.42	4	▼4	6	Steady	10	▼4
Liberal Democratic Party	67,452	9.33	▼4.25	4	▼2	0	Steady	4	▼2
New People	57,220	7.91	▲0.99	3	Steady	1	▲1	4	▲1
A Just Russia — For Truth	56,292	7.78	▲1.66	3	▲1	1	▲1	4	▲2
Party of Pensioners	47,961	6.63	▲0.94	2	Steady	0	Steady	2	Steady
Rodina	8,064	1.12	▼2.12	0	Steady	1	▼1	1	▼1
The Greens	6,429	0.89	▼1.75	0	Steady	–	–	0	Steady
Independent	–	–	–	–	–	0	▼3	0	▼3
Invalid ballots	23,250	3.22	▼0.48	—	—	—	—	—	—
Total	723,112	100.00	—	38	Steady	38	Steady	76	Steady
Turnout	723,112	33.02	▲4.77	—	—	—	—	—	—
Registered voters	2,189,929	100.00	—	—	—	—	—	—	—

Andrey Shimkiv (United Russia) was re-elected as Chairman of the Legislative Assembly, while incumbent Senator Aleksandr Karelin (United Russia) was re-appointed to the Federation Council.

=== Results in single-member constituencies ===
==== District 1 ====
Summary of the 12–14 September 2025 Legislative Assembly of Novosibirsk Oblast election in District 1
Candidate	Party	Votes	%
Daniil Prokhorov	United Russia	17,145	61.35%
Khatira Belyalova	Communist Party	3,529	12.63%
Asif Ismaylov	Liberal Democratic Party	2,461	8.81%
Sergey Mishanin	A Just Russia – For Truth	2,205	7.89%
Sergey Kolychev	New People	1,387	4.96%
Total		27,944	100%

==== District 2 ====
Summary of the 12–14 September 2025 Legislative Assembly of Novosibirsk Oblast election in District 2
Candidate	Party	Votes	%
Igor Umerbayev (incumbent)	United Russia	15,587	66.90%
Sergey Usakov	Communist Party	2,645	11.35%
Aleksandr Dubovik	Liberal Democratic Party	2,044	8.77%
Natalya Timoshenko	New People	1,466	6.29%
Svetlana Rendarevskaya	A Just Russia – For Truth	727	3.12%
Total		23,299	100%

==== District 3 ====
Summary of the 12–14 September 2025 Legislative Assembly of Novosibirsk Oblast election in District 3
Candidate	Party	Votes	%
Sergey Smirnov (incumbent)	United Russia	13,285	59.05%
Natalya Khrushchyova	A Just Russia – For Truth	3,402	15.12%
Marina Voynova	Liberal Democratic Party	2,520	11.20%
Dmitry Choliy	New People	1,947	8.65%
Total		22,499	100%

==== District 4 ====
Summary of the 12–14 September 2025 Legislative Assembly of Novosibirsk Oblast election in District 4
Candidate	Party	Votes	%
Vitaly Novoselov (incumbent)	United Russia	12,257	52.27%
Aleksey Tokarev	A Just Russia – For Truth	4,613	19.67%
Yury Badazhkov	Communist Party	2,362	10.07%
Yana Muzychenko	Liberal Democratic Party	1,920	8.19%
Farid Minnibayev	New People	1,278	5.45%
Total		23,450	100%

==== District 5 ====
Summary of the 12–14 September 2025 Legislative Assembly of Novosibirsk Oblast election in District 5
Candidate	Party	Votes	%
Aleksandr Kulinich (incumbent)	United Russia	13,395	63.35%
Svetlana Soboleva	Communist Party	2,326	11.00%
Anatoly Marenkov	Liberal Democratic Party	1,565	7.40%
Anastasia Khaimchik	Party of Pensioners	1,367	6.47%
Sergey Belovolov	A Just Russia – For Truth	1,209	5.72%
Samat Bitenov	New People	632	2.99%
Total		21,143	100%

==== District 6 ====
Summary of the 12–14 September 2025 Legislative Assembly of Novosibirsk Oblast election in District 6
Candidate	Party	Votes	%
Denis Subbotin	United Russia	15,102	58.47%
Yelizaveta Ankudinova	Party of Pensioners	3,127	12.11%
Zinaida Yemelyanova	Communist Party	3,011	11.66%
Yevgeny Popkov	A Just Russia – For Truth	2,790	10.80%
Anastasia Saryg-ool	New People	843	3.26%
Total		25,830	100%

==== District 7 ====
Summary of the 12–14 September 2025 Legislative Assembly of Novosibirsk Oblast election in District 7
Candidate	Party	Votes	%
Oleg Podoyma (incumbent)	United Russia	11,661	52.76%
Ruslan Kolnik	A Just Russia – For Truth	2,386	10.80%
Vladimir Alabugin	Liberal Democratic Party	1,926	8.71%
Igor Osmak	Communist Party	1,824	8.25%
Dmitry Babenko	New People	1,481	6.70%
Vladislav Opolev	Party of Pensioners	1,319	5.97%
Total		22,100	100%

==== District 8 ====
Summary of the 12–14 September 2025 Legislative Assembly of Novosibirsk Oblast election in District 8
Candidate	Party	Votes	%
Yaroslav Frolov (incumbent)	United Russia	14,603	57.73%
Viktor Bogachev	Liberal Democratic Party	4,170	16.49%
Aleksey Gorlach	Communist Party	3,047	12.05%
Irina Lukinova	A Just Russia – For Truth	2,251	8.90%
Total		25,294	100%

==== District 9 ====
Summary of the 12–14 September 2025 Legislative Assembly of Novosibirsk Oblast election in District 9
Candidate	Party	Votes	%
Aleksandr Shpikelman (incumbent)	United Russia	12,000	50.39%
Ivan Bocharov	A Just Russia – For Truth	4,496	18.88%
Natalya Simonova	Communist Party	2,081	8.74%
Anna Lavrovskaya	Liberal Democratic Party	1,691	7.10%
Olga Izgarsheva	Party of Pensioners	1,099	4.61%
Vladimir Kuznetsov	New People	1,032	4.33%
Total		23,816	100%

==== District 10 ====
Summary of the 12–14 September 2025 Legislative Assembly of Novosibirsk Oblast election in District 10
Candidate	Party	Votes	%
Andrey Bil (incumbent)	United Russia	10,034	54.95%
Tatyana Malyugina	Liberal Democratic Party	2,710	14.84%
Natalya Pshenichnaya	Communist Party	2,300	12.60%
Vyacheslav Vasilenko	A Just Russia – For Truth	1,871	10.25%
Total		18,261	100%

==== District 11 ====
Summary of the 12–14 September 2025 Legislative Assembly of Novosibirsk Oblast election in District 11
Candidate	Party	Votes	%
Tatyana Zakharova	United Russia	6,353	43.66%
Yelena Shuyskaya	Communist Party	2,013	13.83%
Anastasia Suvorova	Liberal Democratic Party	1,940	13.33%
Igor Kokoulin	A Just Russia – For Truth	1,099	7.55%
Aleksey Prokudin	Party of Pensioners	1,092	7.50%
Oleg Kuzmin	New People	965	6.63%
Total		14,551	100%

==== District 12 ====
Summary of the 12–14 September 2025 Legislative Assembly of Novosibirsk Oblast election in District 12
Candidate	Party	Votes	%
Irina Didenko	United Russia	6,958	48.93%
Yelena Peregudova	Communist Party	2,375	16.70%
Olga Popova	Liberal Democratic Party	1,758	12.36%
Vadim Vorobyev	New People	1,210	8.51%
Maksim Bullikh	A Just Russia – For Truth	1,180	8.30%
Total		14,221	100%

==== District 13 ====
Summary of the 12–14 September 2025 Legislative Assembly of Novosibirsk Oblast election in District 13
Candidate	Party	Votes	%
Andrey Shimkiv (incumbent)	United Russia	29,520	85.50%
Nikolay Zavalishin	A Just Russia – For Truth	4,171	12.08%
Total		34,526	100%

==== District 14 ====
Summary of the 12–14 September 2025 Legislative Assembly of Novosibirsk Oblast election in District 14
Candidate	Party	Votes	%
Mayis Mamedov	United Russia	21,957	69.47%
Andrey Bochkarev	Liberal Democratic Party	4,568	14.45%
Tatyana Rostova	New People	1,650	5.22%
Konstantin Shchyokov	Communist Party	1,458	4.61%
Vladislav Cherenkov	A Just Russia – For Truth	986	3.12%
Total		31,607	100%

==== District 15 ====
Summary of the 12–14 September 2025 Legislative Assembly of Novosibirsk Oblast election in District 15
Candidate	Party	Votes	%
Denis Yuminov	United Russia	13,120	52.99%
Viktor Reutov	Liberal Democratic Party	3,081	12.44%
Nikita Fedchenko	Party of Pensioners	2,724	11.00%
Aleksandr Baranik	Communist Party	2,194	8.86%
Anatoly Akentyev	A Just Russia – For Truth	2,189	8.84%
Total		24,759	100%

==== District 16 ====
Summary of the 12–14 September 2025 Legislative Assembly of Novosibirsk Oblast election in District 16
Candidate	Party	Votes	%
Zoya Rodina (incumbent)	United Russia	7,407	55.26%
Anton Korniyenko	New People	2,004	14.95%
Anton Uteshev	Communist Party	1,948	14.53%
Valeria Polyntseva	Liberal Democratic Party	1,523	11.36%
Total		13,404	100%

==== District 17 ====
Summary of the 12–14 September 2025 Legislative Assembly of Novosibirsk Oblast election in District 17
Candidate	Party	Votes	%
Igor Grishunin (incumbent)	United Russia	15,099	72.49%
Yekaterina Skabardina	New People	2,383	11.44%
Aleksandr Zhatov	A Just Russia – For Truth	2,013	9.66%
Total		20,830	100%

==== District 18 ====
Summary of the 12–14 September 2025 Legislative Assembly of Novosibirsk Oblast election in District 18
Candidate	Party	Votes	%
Anatoly Yudanov (incumbent)	United Russia	14,200	65.19%
Sergey Ustinov	New People	2,250	10.33%
Davyd Ganke	Liberal Democratic Party	2,199	10.10%
Yury Mazny	Communist Party	1,483	6.81%
Total		21,782	100%

==== District 19 ====
Summary of the 12–14 September 2025 Legislative Assembly of Novosibirsk Oblast election in District 19
Candidate	Party	Votes	%
Yekaterina Kozlovskaya	United Russia	7,397	50.68%
Andrey Kovalev	Liberal Democratic Party	1,538	10.54%
Aleksandr Larkin	Communist Party	1,461	10.01%
Maksim Maksimov	New People	1,382	9.47%
Sergey Pinchuk	A Just Russia – For Truth	987	6.76%
Roman Ponomarev	Party of Pensioners	820	5.62%
Total		14,595	100%

==== District 20 ====
Summary of the 12–14 September 2025 Legislative Assembly of Novosibirsk Oblast election in District 20
Candidate	Party	Votes	%
Yevgeny Lebedev	United Russia	7,852	47.30%
Vitaly Bykov (incumbent)	Communist Party	4,282	25.79%
Aleksandr Vlasov	A Just Russia – For Truth	1,632	9.83%
Polina Agapova	Liberal Democratic Party	731	4.40%
Nikita Parchenko	New People	641	3.86%
Olga Safina	Party of Pensioners	506	3.05%
Total		16,601	100%

==== District 21 ====
Summary of the 12–14 September 2025 Legislative Assembly of Novosibirsk Oblast election in District 21
Candidate	Party	Votes	%
Anton Tyrtyshny	Communist Party	5,317	35.51%
Igor Sazonov	United Russia	2,937	19.61%
Konstantin Antonov (incumbent)	Rodina	1,808	12.07%
Olga Nezamayeva	A Just Russia – For Truth	1,768	11.81%
Aleksandr Triznov	New People	1,467	9.80%
Aleksey Vsemirnov	Liberal Democratic Party	828	5.53%
Total		14,975	100%

==== District 22 ====
Summary of the 12–14 September 2025 Legislative Assembly of Novosibirsk Oblast election in District 22
Candidate	Party	Votes	%
Ilya Polyakov (incumbent)	New People	6,429	43.96%
Andrey Zhirnov	Communist Party	2,706	18.51%
Roman Markeyev	United Russia	2,315	15.83%
Vera Leontyeva	A Just Russia – For Truth	1,138	7.78%
Aleksey Berezin	Liberal Democratic Party	689	4.71%
Valery Fedorov	Party of Pensioners	536	3.67%
Total		14,623	100%

==== District 23 ====
Summary of the 12–14 September 2025 Legislative Assembly of Novosibirsk Oblast election in District 23
Candidate	Party	Votes	%
Yevgeny Shablinsky	United Russia	7,917	49.75%
Alyona Yanuchenko	New People	1,857	11.67%
Vladimir Vesnin	Communist Party	1,695	10.65%
Sergey Leonov	A Just Russia – For Truth	1,204	7.57%
Roman Motovilov	Party of Pensioners	1,065	6.69%
Arina Yakovleva	Liberal Democratic Party	1,042	6.55%
Total		15,913	100%

==== District 24 ====
Summary of the 12–14 September 2025 Legislative Assembly of Novosibirsk Oblast election in District 24
Candidate	Party	Votes	%
Vyacheslav Ilyukhin (incumbent)	Rodina	6,282	39.75%
Sergey Kondratyev	Party of Pensioners	2,841	17.98%
Darya Guzeva	United Russia	2,814	17.81%
Dmitry Kravchenko	Communist Party	928	5.87%
Inga Chaplygina	Liberal Democratic Party	804	5.09%
Ivan Zharky	New People	801	5.09%
Aleksandr Skurikhin	A Just Russia – For Truth	488	3.09%
Total		15,802	100%

==== District 25 ====
Summary of the 12–14 September 2025 Legislative Assembly of Novosibirsk Oblast election in District 25
Candidate	Party	Votes	%
Denis Chernyshov	United Russia	6,852	52.09%
Leonty Konovalov	New People	1,449	11.01%
Maksim Maslov	Communist Party	1,279	9.72%
Anna Abroskina	Party of Pensioners	1,179	8.96%
Aleksandr Vovkudan	Liberal Democratic Party	1,007	7.65%
Dmitry Chadov	A Just Russia – For Truth	740	5.63%
Total		13,155	100%

==== District 26 ====
Summary of the 12–14 September 2025 Legislative Assembly of Novosibirsk Oblast election in District 26
Candidate	Party	Votes	%
Yelena Spasskikh	United Russia	9,539	65.53%
Yulia Kolesnikova	A Just Russia – For Truth	1,789	12.29%
Svetlana Kulakova	Liberal Democratic Party	1,363	9.36%
Khachatur Alaverdyan	New People	908	6.24%
Total		14,557	100%

==== District 27 ====
Summary of the 12–14 September 2025 Legislative Assembly of Novosibirsk Oblast election in District 27
Candidate	Party	Votes	%
Yevgeni Podgorny (incumbent)	United Russia	7,312	57.34%
Olga Vergiles	Party of Pensioners	1,546	12.12%
Olga Yenina	Communist Party	1,128	8.84%
Danila Nikitin	New People	858	6.73%
Denis Sidorkin	Liberal Democratic Party	764	5.99%
Daniil Lomov	A Just Russia – For Truth	492	3.86%
Total		12,753	100%

==== District 28 ====
Summary of the 12–14 September 2025 Legislative Assembly of Novosibirsk Oblast election in District 28
Candidate	Party	Votes	%
Aleksandr Savelyev	United Russia	8,809	59.01%
Maksim Zelenin	New People	1,308	8.76%
Lyubov Naryadnova	Communist Party	1,210	8.11%
Marina Vorontsova	Party of Pensioners	1,068	7.15%
Anna Belousova	A Just Russia – For Truth	987	6.61%
Vyacheslav Bondarev	Liberal Democratic Party	833	5.58%
Total		14,927	100%

==== District 29 ====
Summary of the 12–14 September 2025 Legislative Assembly of Novosibirsk Oblast election in District 29
Candidate	Party	Votes	%
Dmitry Kozlovsky (incumbent)	United Russia	6,654	51.88%
Vitaly Yakovlev	Communist Party	1,571	12.25%
Anastasia Konovalova	New People	1,237	9.64%
Natalya Kirilova	A Just Russia – For Truth	1,119	8.72%
Sergey Kuzmin	Party of Pensioners	927	7.23%
Kristina Fuzeyeva	Liberal Democratic Party	546	4.26%
Total		12,826	100%

==== District 30 ====
Summary of the 12–14 September 2025 Legislative Assembly of Novosibirsk Oblast election in District 30
Candidate	Party	Votes	%
Yakov Novoselov (incumbent)	Communist Party	5,132	33.98%
Olesya Konstantinova	United Russia	3,712	24.57%
Eduard Kozhemyakin	Party of Pensioners	2,115	14.00%
Vasily Titovsky	A Just Russia – For Truth	1,492	9.88%
Sergey Fedorchuk	Liberal Democratic Party	1,335	8.84%
Total		15,105	100%

==== District 31 ====
Summary of the 12–14 September 2025 Legislative Assembly of Novosibirsk Oblast election in District 31
Candidate	Party	Votes	%
Roman Yakovlev (incumbent)	Communist Party	5,982	43.17%
Viktoria Golikova	United Russia	3,503	25.28%
Mikhail Mikhaylov	Liberal Democratic Party	1,051	7.58%
Vyacheslav Grigorovich	New People	1,031	7.44%
Vladimir Kozhemyakin	Party of Pensioners	882	6.36%
Aglaya Semenchuk	A Just Russia – For Truth	481	3.47%
Total		13,858	100%

==== District 32 ====
Summary of the 12–14 September 2025 Legislative Assembly of Novosibirsk Oblast election in District 32
Candidate	Party	Votes	%
Dmitry Makarov (incumbent)	Communist Party	6,041	42.23%
Yury Artemyev	A Just Russia – For Truth	2,234	15.62%
Lev Bobrov	New People	1,705	11.92%
Aleksey Skorin	Liberal Democratic Party	1,498	10.47%
Vladimir Lipovka	Party of Pensioners	1,132	7.91%
Total		14,306	100%

==== District 33 ====
Summary of the 12–14 September 2025 Legislative Assembly of Novosibirsk Oblast election in District 33
Candidate	Party	Votes	%
Natalia Bezruchenkova	United Russia	5,893	41.15%
Yevgeny Smyshlyayev (incumbent)	Communist Party	4,414	30.82%
Sergey Pavlushkin	New People	1,147	8.01%
Oksana Mozalyuk	Party of Pensioners	834	5.82%
Zoya Shkarupa	Liberal Democratic Party	733	5.12%
Konstantin Bekker	A Just Russia – For Truth	658	4.59%
Total		14,321	100%

==== District 34 ====
Summary of the 12–14 September 2025 Legislative Assembly of Novosibirsk Oblast election in District 34
Candidate	Party	Votes	%
Sergey Konko (incumbent)	United Russia	9,107	66.17%
Maksim Belousov	New People	1,072	7.79%
Nikolay Tokarev	Liberal Democratic Party	855	6.21%
Dmitry Grishchenko	Party of Pensioners	775	5.63%
Marina Oksenyuk	Communist Party	772	5.61%
Denis Rodin	A Just Russia – For Truth	604	4.39%
Total		13,764	100%

==== District 35 ====
Summary of the 12–14 September 2025 Legislative Assembly of Novosibirsk Oblast election in District 35
Candidate	Party	Votes	%
Andrey Lyubavsky	Communist Party	8,031	50.11%
Natalya Roy	New People	2,324	14.50%
Aleksandr Rodionov	Party of Pensioners	1,700	10.61%
Artyom Isakov	A Just Russia – For Truth	1,687	10.53%
Pavel Pashkin	Liberal Democratic Party	1,040	6.49%
Total		16,026	100%

==== District 36 ====
Summary of the 12–14 September 2025 Legislative Assembly of Novosibirsk Oblast election in District 36
Candidate	Party	Votes	%
Stanislav Lysenko	Communist Party	9,904	56.82%
Aleksey Andreyev	United Russia	4,384	25.15%
Yelena Shevchenko	Party of Pensioners	730	4.19%
Dmitry Chechulin	New People	666	3.82%
Anastasia Gerchuk	Liberal Democratic Party	644	3.69%
Total		17,429	100%

==== District 37 ====
Summary of the 12–14 September 2025 Legislative Assembly of Novosibirsk Oblast election in District 37
Candidate	Party	Votes	%
Vladislav Plotnikov	A Just Russia – For Truth	5,293	36.67%
Ilya Migulev	Communist Party	3,081	21.34%
Georgy Ponomarev	United Russia	2,447	16.95%
Tatyana Sazonova	New People	1,826	12.65%
Nadezhda Reutova	Liberal Democratic Party	833	5.77%
Total		14,436	100%

==== District 38 ====
Summary of the 12–14 September 2025 Legislative Assembly of Novosibirsk Oblast election in District 3
Candidate	Party	Votes	%
Andrey Khripko	United Russia	6,782	43.40%
Sergey Dorofeyev	Independent	3,571	22.85%
Oksana Brashnina	New People	1,750	11.20%
Vadim Ageyenko (incumbent)	Communist Party	1,700	10.88%
Artemy Karpov	Liberal Democratic Party	666	4.26%
Pavel Pirogov	Party of Pensioners	561	3.59%
Total		15,628	100%

=== Members ===
Incumbent deputies are highlighted with bold, elected members who declined to take a seat are marked with ~~strikethrough~~.

Constituency
No.	Member	Party
1	Daniil Prokhorov	United Russia
2	Igor Umerbayev	United Russia
3	Sergey Smirnov	United Russia
4	Vitaly Novoselov	United Russia
5	Aleksandr Kulinich	United Russia
6	Denis Subbotin	United Russia
7	Oleg Podoyma	United Russia
8	Yaroslav Frolov	United Russia
9	Aleksandr Shpikelman	United Russia
10	Andrey Bil	United Russia
11	Tatyana Zakharova	United Russia
12	Irina Didenko	United Russia
13	Andrey Shimkiv	United Russia
14	Mayis Mamedov	United Russia
15	Denis Yuminov	United Russia
16	Zoya Rodina	United Russia
17	Igor Grishunin	United Russia
18	Anatoly Yudanov	United Russia
19	Yekaterina Kozlovskaya	United Russia
20	Yevgeny Lebedev	United Russia
21	Anton Tyrtyshny	Communist Party
22	Ilya Polyakov	New People
23	Yevgeny Shablinsky	United Russia
24	Vyacheslav Ilyukhin	Rodina
25	Denis Chernyshov	United Russia
26	Yelena Spasskikh	United Russia
27	Yevgeni Podgorny	United Russia
28	Aleksandr Savelyev	United Russia
29	Dmitry Kozlovsky	United Russia
30	Yakov Novoselov	Communist Party
31	Roman Yakovlev	Communist Party
32	Dmitry Makarov	Communist Party
33	Natalia Bezruchenkova	United Russia
34	Sergey Konko	United Russia
35	Andrey Lyubavsky	Communist Party
36	Stanislav Lysenko	Communist Party
37	Vladislav Plotnikov	A Just Russia – For Truth
38	Andrey Khripko	United Russia

Party lists
Member	Party
~~Andrey Travnikov~~	United Russia
Aleksandr Karelin	United Russia
Viktor Kushnir	United Russia
Dmitry Igumnov	United Russia
Yulia Shvets	United Russia
Aleksandr Terepa	United Russia
Sergey Kalchenko	United Russia
Sergey Gayduk	United Russia
Valery Ilyenko	United Russia
~~Valery Badyin~~	United Russia
~~Galina Melnikova~~	United Russia
~~Galina Adayeva~~	United Russia
~~Larisa Sheveleva~~	United Russia
Aleksandr Teplyakov	United Russia
Ivan Moroz	United Russia
Yelena Tyrina	United Russia
Yury Pokhil	United Russia
Pavel Kiva	United Russia
Yevgeny Panfyorov	United Russia
Albina Nikolayeva	United Russia
Veniamin Park	United Russia
Oleg Sitkin	United Russia
Lev Nagornyak	United Russia
Pavel Chernousov	United Russia
Aleksandr Shcherbak	United Russia
~~Danil Luzgin~~	United Russia
~~Viktoria Shestakova~~	United Russia
~~Andrey Gudovsky~~	United Russia
~~Yevgeny Gavrikov~~	United Russia
Danila Vorotnikov	United Russia
Andrey Kumov	United Russia
Vladimir Karpov	Communist Party
Nikolay Mashkarin	Communist Party
~~Aleksey Rusakov~~	Communist Party
~~Viktor Strelnikov~~	Communist Party
~~Pavel Gorshkov~~	Communist Party
Ashot Rafaelyan	Communist Party
Aleksey Matveyev	Communist Party
~~Leonid Slutsky~~	Liberal Democratic Party
Anna Tereshkova	Liberal Democratic Party
Aleksandr Boyko	Liberal Democratic Party
~~Viktor Bogachev~~	Liberal Democratic Party
~~Aleksandr Fedotov~~	Liberal Democratic Party
~~Tatyana Malyugina~~	Liberal Democratic Party
~~Irina Leshukova~~	Liberal Democratic Party
Vladimir Martynenkov	Liberal Democratic Party
Yelena Gladysheva	Liberal Democratic Party
~~Nikita Stolpovsky~~	Liberal Democratic Party
~~Arina Kriger~~	Liberal Democratic Party
~~Andrey Bochkarev~~	Liberal Democratic Party
~~Sergey Kashnikov~~	Liberal Democratic Party
~~Vladislav Davankov~~	New People
Darya Karaseva	New People
Darya Ukraintseva	New People
Marat Safarov	New People
~~Alexander Aksyonenko~~	A Just Russia – For Truth
Ruslan Kolnik	A Just Russia – For Truth
Roman Sivak	A Just Russia – For Truth
Konstantin Tereshchenko	A Just Russia – For Truth
Vladimir Vorozhtsov	Party of Pensioners
Aleksandr Averkin	Party of Pensioners

== See also ==
- 2025 Russian regional elections
