= Governor of Novosibirsk Oblast =

Highest-ranking official in Novosibirsk Oblast, Russia

Governor, Chair of Government of Novosibirsk Oblast
- Губернатор, Председатель Правительства Новосибирской области

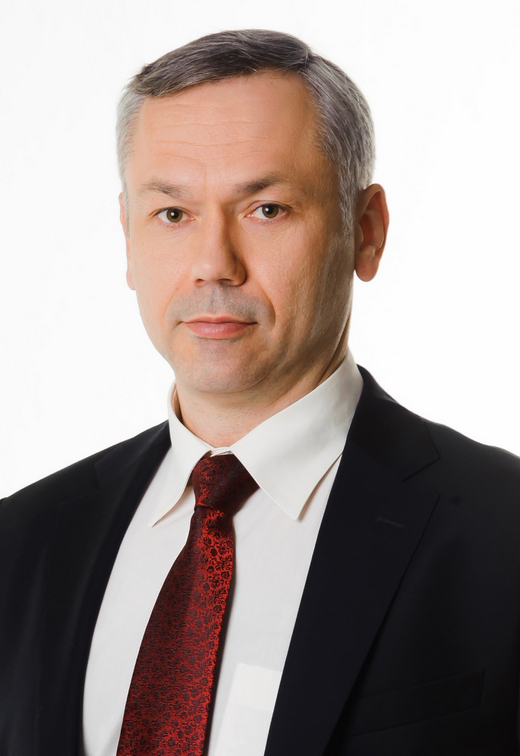
- Incumbent; Andrey Travnikov since 14 September 2018
- Residence: Novosibirsk
- Term length: 5 years
- Inaugural holder: Vitaly Mukha
- Formation: 26 November 1991
- Deputy: Alexey Khomlyansky
- Website: www.nso.ru

The Governor of Novosibirsk Oblast (Russian: Губернатор Новосибирской области, Gubernator Novosibirskoy oblasti) is the chief executive (defined by the local Charter as "the supreme public officer") of Novosibirsk Oblast, Russia. According to the regional law, the Governor, being "at the head of the supreme executive state body of Novosibirsk Oblast" holds the official title of the Chair of the Oblast Government.

Andrey Travnikov, representing "United Russia" party, was nominated as Governor by President Vladimir Putin on 6 October 2017, replacing Vladimir Gorodetsky.

== List ==
No.	Image	Governor	Tenure	Time in office	Party	Election
1		Vitaly Mukha (1936–2005)	26 November 1991 – 5 October 1993 (removed)	1 year, 313 days	Independent	Appointed
–		Ivan Indinok (1938–2025)	5 October 1993 – 18 December 1993	2 years, 86 days	Independent	Acting
2		Ivan Indinok (1938–2025)	18 December 1993 – 30 December 1995 (lost election)	2 years, 86 days	Independent	Appointed
(1)		Vitaly Mukha (1936–2005)	30 December 1995 – 14 January 2000 (lost re-election)	4 years, 15 days	Independent	1995
3		Viktor Tolokonsky (born 1953)	14 January 2000 – 9 September 2010 (resigned)	10 years, 238 days	Independent → United Russia	1999–2000; 2003; 2007
–		Vasily Yurchenko (born 1960)	9 September 2010 – 22 September 2010	3 years, 189 days	United Russia	Acting
4		Vasily Yurchenko (born 1960)	22 September 2010 – 17 March 2014 (removed)	3 years, 189 days	United Russia	2010
–		Vladimir Gorodetsky (born 1948)	17 March 2014 – 24 September 2014	3 years, 203 days	United Russia	Acting
5		Vladimir Gorodetsky (born 1948)	24 September 2014 – 6 October 2017 (resigned)	3 years, 203 days	United Russia	2014
–		Andrey Travnikov (born 1971)	6 October 2017 – 14 September 2018	8 years, 336 days	United Russia	Acting
6		Andrey Travnikov (born 1971)	14 September 2018 – present	8 years, 336 days	United Russia	2018; 2023

== Elections ==
The latest election for the office was held on 10 September 2023.
