= 2014 Russian elections =

Russian Election Day, 2014
- 14 September 2014
- Gubernatorial (Note: Excluding indirect elections) Gubernatorial of another subject (Note: Voters in Khanty-Mansi and Yamalo-Nenets Autonomous Okrugs were eligible to vote in the Tyumen Oblast gubernatorial election.) Legislative Gubernatorial and legislative

Election Day in Russia was held on September 14, 2014. There was a range of gubernatorial, regional legislative, local mayoral, and local legislative elections.

== Gubernatorial elections ==
=== Direct ===
A total of 30 governorships were up for election on 14 September 2014, of them 15 incumbents saw their terms expiring, while 13 more governors decided to resign in order to call a snap election (while being 2 or 3 years into their terms) and to "renew" their mandate via popular vote.

2014 was the third year since direct gubernatorial elections were restored nationwide, and as a result, all incumbents who ran for re-election that year were previously appointed by president at least once with the consent of their region's legislature. All vacancies that occurred since the start of the previous campaign period (June 2013) were also filled by presidential decree.

Federal subject	Previous chief executive	Term start	Acting chief executive	Candidates	Result
Altai Republic	Alexander Berdnikov	2006	Himself	✓ Alexander Berdnikov (UR) 50.63%; Vladimir Petrov (GS) 36.44%; Viktor Romashkin (CPRF) 7.72%	Incumbent's term expired, appointed acting head, then re-elected.
Bashkortostan	Rustem Khamitov	2010	Himself	✓ Rustem Khamitov (UR) 81.71%; Yunir Kutluguzhin (CPRF) 10.13%	Incumbent resigned to trigger a snap election, then re-elected.
Kalmykia	Aleksey Orlov	2010	Himself	✓ Aleksey Orlov (UR) 82.89%; Nikolay Nurov (CPRF) 8.26%	Incumbent resigned to trigger a snap election, then re-elected.
Komi Republic	Vyacheslav Gayzer	2010	Himself	✓ Vyacheslav Gayzer (UR) 78.97%; Andrey Andreyev (CPRF) 6.85%	Incumbent's term expired, appointed acting head, then re-elected.
Sakha (Yakutia)	Yegor Borisov	2010	Himself	✓ Yegor Borisov (UR) 58.79%; Ernst Beryozkin (GP) 29.49%; Viktor Gubarev (CPRF) 5.31%	Incumbent resigned to trigger a snap election, then re-elected.
Udmurtia	Alexander Volkov	2000	Alexander Solovyov	✓ Alexander Solovyov (UR) 84.84%; Vladimir Chepkasov 7.65%	Incumbent retired. Acting head elected for a full term.
Altai Krai	Alexander Karlin	2005	Himself	✓ Alexander Karlin (UR) 72.97%; Sergey Yurchenko (CPRF) 11.22%; Oleg Boronin (SR) 7.54%; Andrey Shchukin (LDPR) 5.16%	Incumbent's term expired, appointed acting governor, then re-elected.
Krasnoyarsk Krai	Lev Kuznetsov	2010	Viktor Tolokonsky	✓ Viktor Tolokonsky (UR) 63.30%; Valery Sergiyenko (CPRF) 14.01%; Ivan Serebryakov (PoR) 13.88%; Denis Pobilat (LDPR) 5.36%	Incumbent resigned. Acting governor elected for a full term.
Primorsky Krai	Vladimir Miklushevsky	2012	Himself	✓ Vladimir Miklushevsky (UR) 77.43%; Vladimir Grishukov 12.67%	Incumbent resigned to trigger a snap election, then re-elected.
Stavropol Krai	Valery Zerenkov	2012	Vladimir Vladimirov	✓ Vladimir Vladimirov (UR) 84.22%; Viktor Goncharov (CPRF) 6.10%; Olga Drozdova (LDPR) 5.31%	Incumbent resigned. Acting governor elected for a full term.
Astrakhan Oblast	Alexander Zhilkin	2004	none	✓ Alexander Zhilkin (UR) 75.28%; Oleg Shein (SR) 16.22%	Incumbent re-elected.
Chelyabinsk Oblast	Mikhail Yurevich	2010	Boris Dubrovsky	✓ Boris Dubrovsky (UR) 86.37%; Konstantin Natsiyevsky (CPRF) 5.25%	Incumbent resigned. Acting governor elected for a full term.
Ivanovo Oblast	Mikhail Men	2005	Pavel Konkov	✓ Pavel Konkov (UR) 80.32%; Nikolay Zimin (CPRF) 7.83%; Sergey Sirotkin (LDPR) 6.41%	Incumbent resigned. Acting governor elected for a full term.
Kirov Oblast	Nikita Belykh	2009	Himself	✓ Nikita Belykh (Ind.) 69.98%; Sergey Mamayev (CPRF) 15.99%; Kirill Cherkasov (LDPR) 9.92%	Incumbent's term expired, appointed acting governor, then re-elected.
Kurgan Oblast	Oleg Bogomolov	1997	Aleksey Kokorin	✓ Aleksey Kokorin (UR) 84.87%; Ivan Yevgenov (CPRF) 8.07%	Incumbent resigned. Acting governor elected for a full term.
Kursk Oblast	Alexander Mikhailov	2000	Himself	✓ Alexander Mikhailov (UR) 66.81%; Vladimir Firsov (CPRF) 11.73%; Vladimir Fyodorov (LDPR) 10.33%	Incumbent resigned to trigger a snap election, then re-elected.
Lipetsk Oblast	Oleg Korolyov	1998	Himself	✓ Oleg Korolyov (UR) 81.83%; Maksim Khalimonchuk (LDPR) 7.24%	Incumbent resigned to trigger a snap election, then re-elected.
Murmansk Oblast	Marina Kovtun	2012	Herself	✓ Marina Kovtun (UR) 64.69%; Mikhail Antropov (CPRF) 11.29%; Aleksandr Makarevich (SR) 10.77%; Maksim Belov (LDPR) 5.50%; Igor Morar (GP) 5.49%	Incumbent resigned to trigger a snap election, then re-elected.
Nizhny Novgorod Oblast	Valery Shantsev	2005	Himself	✓ Valery Shantsev (UR) 86.93%; Aleksandr Bochkaryov (SR) 5.65%	Incumbent resigned to trigger a snap election, then re-elected.
Novosibirsk Oblast	Vasily Yurchenko	2010	Vladimir Gorodetsky	✓ Vladimir Gorodetsky (UR) 64.97%; Dmitry Savelyev (LDPR) 18.82%; Anatoly Kubanov (SR) 13.49%	Incumbent removed from office. Acting governor elected for a full term.
Orenburg Oblast	Yury Berg	2010	Himself	✓ Yury Berg (UR) 80.28%; Aleksandr Mitin (Chestno) 7.37%	Incumbent resigned to trigger a snap election, then re-elected.
Oryol Oblast	Aleksandr Kozlov	2009	Vadim Potomsky	✓ Vadim Potomsky (CPRF) 89.17%; Vitaly Uteshev (LDPR) 3.74%	Incumbent retired. Acting governor elected for a full term.
Pskov Oblast	Andrey Turchak	2009	Himself	✓ Andrey Turchak (UR) 78.36%; Aleksandr Rogov (CPRF) 11.22%; Oleg Bryachak (SR) 5.28%	Incumbent's term expired, appointed acting governor, then re-elected.
Samara Oblast	Nikolay Merkushkin	2012	Himself	✓ Nikolay Merkushkin (UR) 91.35%; Mikhail Matveyev (CPRF) 3.95%	Incumbent resigned to trigger a snap election, then re-elected.
Tyumen Oblast	Vladimir Yakushev	2005	Himself	✓ Vladimir Yakushev (UR) 86.56%; Mikhail Selyukov (LDPR) 6.21%; Vladimir Piskaykin (SR) 5.36%	Incumbent resigned to trigger a snap election, then re-elected.
Volgograd Oblast	Sergey Bozhenov	2012	Andrey Bocharov	✓ Andrey Bocharov (UR) 88.49%; Oleg Mikheyev (SR) 4.45%	Incumbent resigned. Acting governor elected for a full term.
Vologda Oblast	Oleg Kuvshinnikov	2011	Himself	✓ Oleg Kuvshinnikov (UR) 62.98%; Aleksandr Morozov (CPRF) 18.04%; Sergey Karginov (LDPR) 10.34%; Aleksandr Teltevskoy (SR) 6.31%	Incumbent resigned to trigger a snap election, then re-elected.
Voronezh Oblast	Alexey Gordeyev	2009	Himself	✓ Alexey Gordeyev (UR) 88.75%; Konstantin Ashifin (CPRF) 7.69%	Incumbent's term expired, appointed acting governor, then re-elected.
Saint Petersburg	Georgy Poltavchenko	2011	Himself	✓ Georgy Poltavchenko (UR) 79.30%; Irina Ivanova 9.37%	Incumbent resigned to trigger a snap election, then re-elected.
Nenets Autonomous Okrug	Igor Fyodorov	2009	Igor Koshin	✓ Igor Koshin (UR) 76.70%; Andrey Smychenkov (LDPR) 7.67%; Nikolay Ostrodumov (SR) 6.33%; Timofey Soluyanov (Rodina) 5.06%	Incumbent retired. Acting governor elected for a full term.

=== Indirect ===
Federal Subject	Incumbent	Candidates	Result
Crimea (Note: Internationally recognised as part of Ukraine, see political status of Crimea and annexation of Crimea by the Russian Federation for details.)	Sergey Aksyonov	✓ Sergey Aksyonov 75 / 75; Gennady Narayev 0 / 70; Alexander Terentyev 0 / 70	Acting head elected for a full term.
Kabardino-Balkaria	Arsen Kanokov Yury Kokov	✓ Yury Kokov 70 / 70; Irina Maryash 0 / 70; Aliy Musukov 0 / 70	Incumbent resigned. Acting head elected for a full term.
Sevastopol	Sergey Menyaylo	✓ Sergey Menyaylo 21 / 24; Vasily Parkhomenko 0 / 24; Oleg Roslyakov 0 / 24; Invalid ballots 3 / 24	Acting governor elected for a full term.

== Regional legislative elections ==
- Altai Republic
- Republic of Crimea and Sevastopol
- Kabardino-Balkaria
- Karachay-Cherkessia
- Mari El
- Tatarstan
- Tuva
- Khabarovsk Krai
- Bryansk Oblast
- Volgograd Oblast
- Tula Oblast
- 2014 Moscow City Duma election
- Nenets Autonomous Okrug
