= Yelena Dyagileva =

- Елена Дягилева
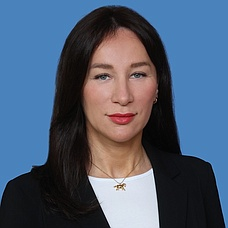

Senator from Murmansk Oblast
- Incumbent
- Assumed office 1 October 2024
- Preceded by: Konstantin Dolgov

Personal details
- Born: 1 January 1978 (age 48) Murmansk, RSFSR, Soviet Union
- Party: Independent
- Education: Saint Petersburg State University of Economics

Yelena Vasilyevna Dyagileva (Russian: Елена Васильевна Дягилева; born January 1, 1978, Murmansk) is a Russian politician and senator of the Federation Council representing the executive branch of the Murmansk Oblast (since October 1, 2024). She is a member of the Budget and Financial Markets Committee.

== Biography ==
In 2002, she graduated from Saint Petersburg State University of Economics.

Since April 2017 she has served as Minister of Finance of the Murmansk Oblast and joined the government of the Murmansk Oblast.

In October 2019 she was appointed Deputy Governor and Minister of Finance of the Murmansk Oblast.

Since June 2020, she left her post as Minister of Finance and became Deputy Governor of the Murmansk Oblast. She oversaw social affairs and finance.

During the 2024 Murmansk Oblast Gubernatorial Election, incumbent head Andrey Chibis nominated her as one of three candidates for the post of Federation Council Senator from the Murmansk Oblast Government. Following her re-election, Chibis was delegated to the Federation Council and appointed to the Budget and Financial Markets Committee.
