= Yury Yevdokimov =

Russian governor

- Юрий Евдокимов
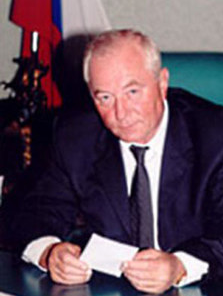

2nd Governor (Head) of Murmansk Oblast
- In office 7 December 1997 – 25 March 2009
- Preceded by: Yevgeny Komarov
- Succeeded by: Dmitry Dmitriyenko

Personal details
- Born: Yury Alekseyevich Yevdokimov; 10 December 1945 (age 80) Klevan, Ukrainian SSR, Soviet Union
- Party: United Russia

Yury Alekseyevich Yevdokimov (Russian: Юрий Алексеевич Евдокимов, born 10 December 1945) was the Governor of Murmansk Oblast, Russia. He became the governor in 1996 and was reelected with a large overall majority on March 14, 2004. He was dismissed in March 2009 by presidential decree (at his own request, according to the Kremlin) after he had been criticized by President Dmitry Medvedev of "fooling around abroad" and "betraying Arctic interests".

== Honours and awards ==
- Order of Merit for the Fatherland;
  - 3rd class (1 January 2006) - for outstanding contribution to the socio-economic development of the field and many years of honest work
  - 4th class (8 December 1999) - for his great personal contribution to the socio-economic development of the field
- Order of the Badge of Honour
- Commander of the Royal Norwegian Order of Merit (29 August 2007)

Political offices
Preceded by Himself (as Head of the Administration)	Governor of Murmansk Oblast; 1997–2009	Succeeded by Dmitry Dmitriyenko
