= Governor of Murmansk Oblast =

Highest-ranking official in Murmansk Oblast, Russia

- Coat of arms of Murmansk Oblast

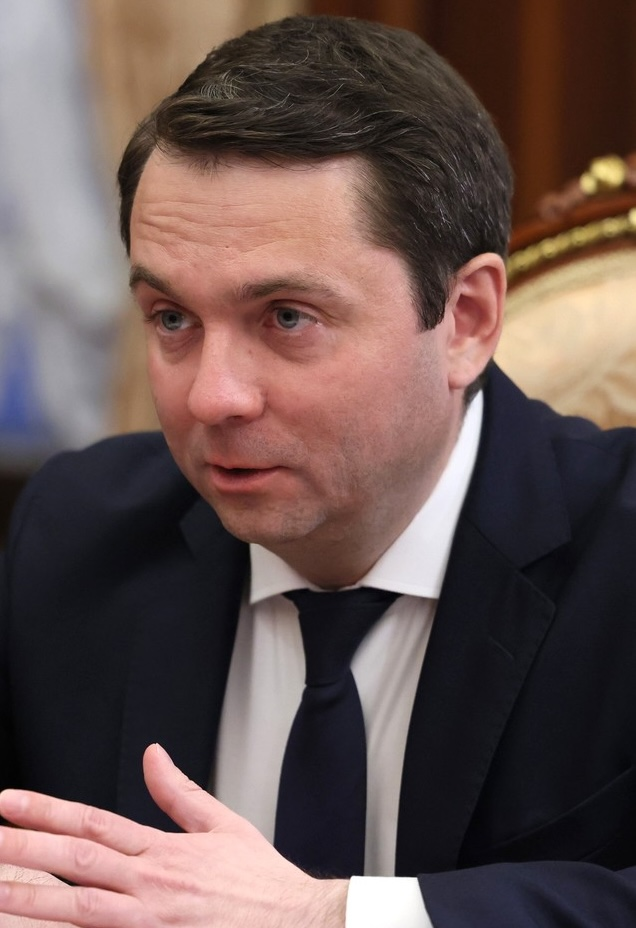
- Incumbent; Andrey Chibis since 27 September 2019
- Residence: Murmansk
- Term length: 5 years
- Inaugural holder: Yevgeny Komarov
- Formation: 1991
- Website: eng.gov-murman.ru

The Governor of Murmansk Oblast (Russian: Губернатор Мурманской области) is the head of the executive branch of government in Murmansk Oblast, in northwestern Russia. The position of governor under the current Charter of Murmansk Oblast was created in 1997. Until the adoption of the current charter, the head of Murmansk oblast was titled Head of the Murmansk Oblast Administration.

== List of officeholders ==
No.	Image	Governor	Tenure	Time in office	Party	Election
1		Yevgeny Komarov (born 1942)	10 November 1991 – 7 December 1996 (lost election)	5 years, 27 days	Independent	Appointed
2		Yury Yevdokimov (born 1945)	7 December 1996 – 21 March 2009 (resigned)	12 years, 104 days	Independent → United Russia	1996; 2000; 2004; 2007
–		Dmitry Dmitriyenko (born 1963)	21 March 2009 – 25 March 2009	3 years, 14 days	United Russia	Acting
3		Dmitry Dmitriyenko (born 1963)	25 March 2009 – 4 April 2012 (resigned)	3 years, 14 days	United Russia	2009
–		Marina Kovtun (born 1962)	4 April 2012 – 13 April 2012	6 years, 351 days	United Russia	Acting
4		Marina Kovtun (born 1962)	13 April 2012 – 5 May 2014 (resigned)	6 years, 351 days	United Russia	2012
–		Marina Kovtun (born 1962)	5 May 2014 – 8 October 2014	6 years, 351 days	United Russia	Acting
(4)		Marina Kovtun (born 1962)	8 October 2014 – 21 March 2019 (resigned)	6 years, 351 days	United Russia	2014
–		Andrey Chibis (born 1979)	21 March 2019 – 27 September 2019	7 years, 170 days	United Russia	Acting
5		Andrey Chibis (born 1979)	27 September 2019 – present	7 years, 170 days	United Russia	2019; 2024
Between 5 and 11 April 2024 Nadezhda Aksyonova served as acting governor following an assassination attempt on Chibis.
Between 11 and 18 April 2024 Oksana Demchenko served as acting governor, replacing Aksyonova.

== Elections ==
=== 2019 ===
The latest election for the office was held on 8 September 2019.

=== 2014 ===
The first election for the office after the countrywide restoration of direct gubernatorial elections was held on 14 September 2014.

Candidates	Party	Votes	%
Mikhail Antropov	Communist Party of the Russian Federation	22,252	11.29
Maxim Belov	Liberal Democratic Party of Russia	10,845	5.50
Marina Kovtun	United Russia	127,539	64.69
Alexander Makarevich	A Just Russia	21,234	10.77
Igor Morar	Civic Platform	10,824	5.49
