= Dmitry Dmitriyenko =

- Дмитрий Дмитриенко
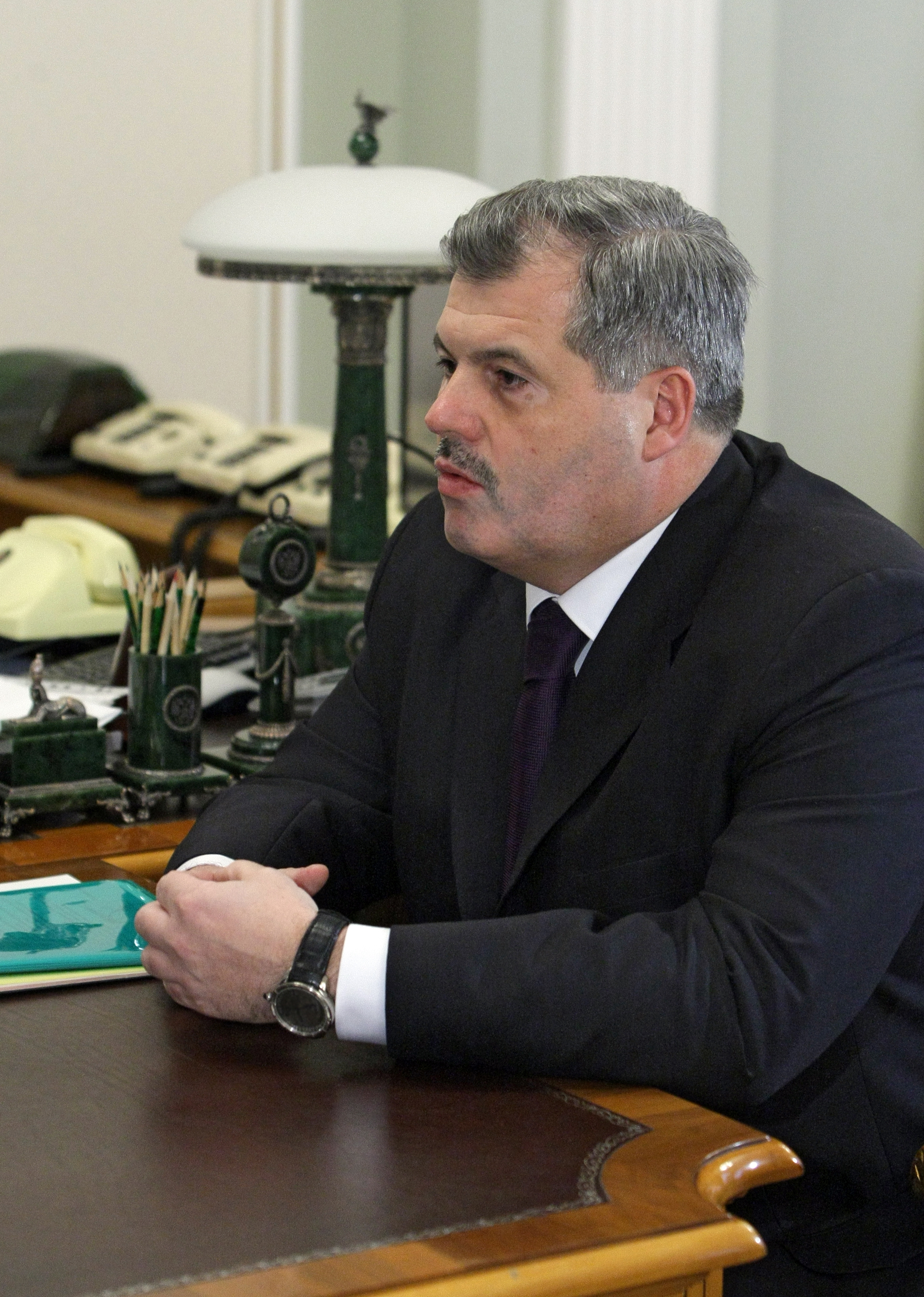
- Dmitriyenko in 2011

3rd Governor of Murmansk Oblast
- In office 25 March 2009 – 4 April 2012
- Preceded by: Yury Yevdokimov
- Succeeded by: Marina Kovtun

Personal details
- Born: Dmitry Vladimirovich Dmitriyenko; 17 August 1963 (age 63) Namangan, Uzbek SSR, Soviet Union
- Party: United Russia

Dmitry Vladimirovich Dmitriyenko (Russian: Дмитрий Владимирович Дмитриенко; born 17 August 1963) is the former Governor of Murmansk. He worked in the army during the 1980s and in various Murmanskian government agencies, including water management, prior to his appointment to the governorship in March 2009.

In 2012 he resigned from the Murmansk Oblast Governorship.

== Education ==
In 1985, Dmitriyenko graduated from navy academy school and was specialized as an engineer in naval electro-mechanics. In 1999 he graduated from North-West academy of state services and was specialized there as a manager in the sphere of state and municipal sphere.

== Political career ==
From 1980 to 1992, Dmitriyenko served in the army at Pacific and North Fleets.

From 1992 to 2004, Dmitriyenko worked as a manager at several private companies. 1999–2002, he was a counselor to the Governor of Krasnoyarsk region on energy and transport issues. This included a brief stint from 2002 to 2004 as a counselor to the deputy Transport Minister.

From 2004 to 2006, he was promoted to the position of assistant to the head of the Federal Agency of Transport. In March 2006, he was again promoted to deputy head of the Agency in the area of economy and finances.

In 2008, President Vladimir Putin appointed Dmitrienko to the position of deputy head of the Federal Fisheries Agency.

=== Governor of Murmansk ===
On 21 March 2009, President Dmitry Medvedev nominated Dmitriyenko acting Governor of Murmansk Oblast. Medvedev chose not to use his power to personally appoint new Governors. The Murmansk regional Duma approved Dmitriyenko for the position, and appointed him Governor on 23 March.

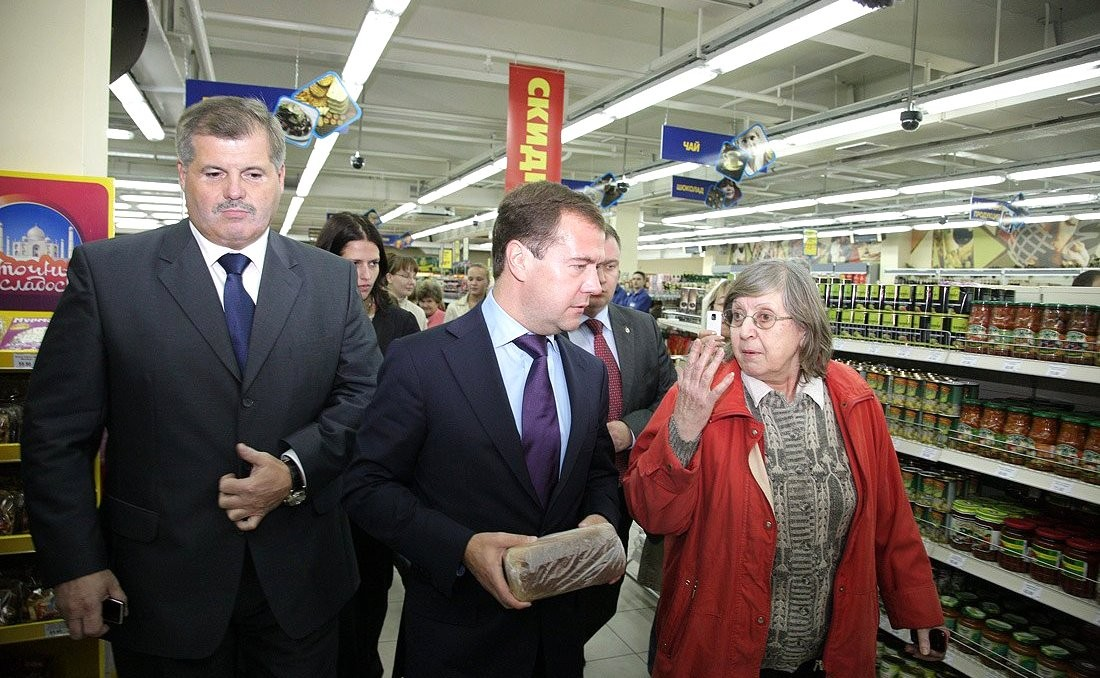
With Dmitry Medvedev on Murmansk shop, 15 September 2010

According to Russian journalists, Dmitriyenko wants to use new laws restricting local government elections to remove a number of regional officials from office.

On 4 April 2012 he resigned from office, and was replaced by Marina Kovtun.

Political offices
Preceded by Yury Yevdokimov	Governor of Murmansk Oblast; 2009–2012	Succeeded by Marina Kovtun; Acting
