= Andrey Chibis =

Russian politician (born 1979)

- Андрей Чибис
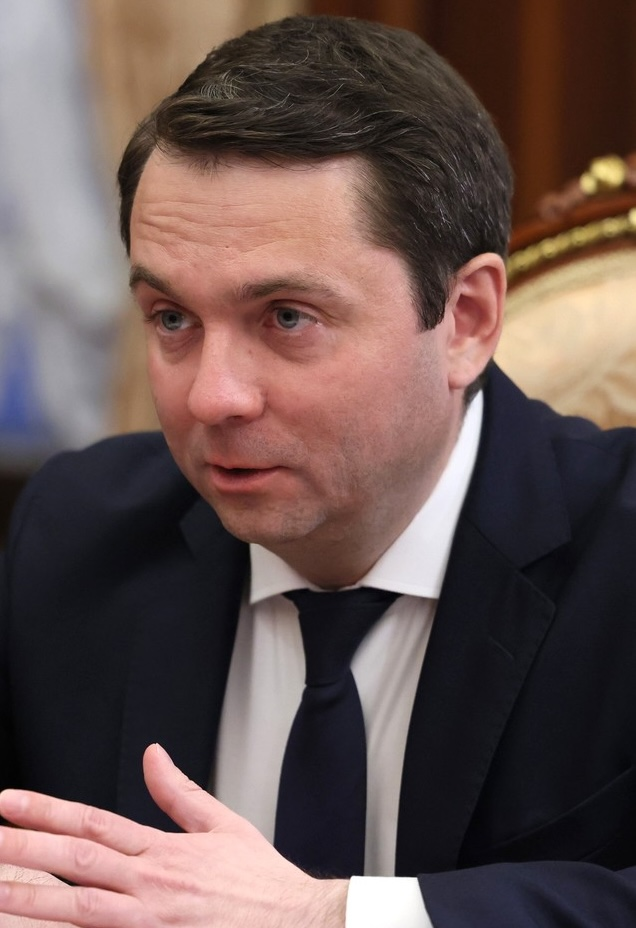
- Chibis in 2022

5th Governor of Murmansk Oblast
- Incumbent
- Assumed office 27 September 2019
- Preceded by: Marina Kovtun

Governor of Murmansk Oblast (acting)
- In office 21 March 2019 – 27 September 2019

Chief State Housing Inspector of the Russian Federation
- In office 12 September 2014 – 21 March 2019
- Succeeded by: Maksim Yegorov

Personal details
- Born: Andrey Vladimirovich Chibis; 19 March 1979 (age 47) Cheboksary, Russian Soviet Federative Socialist Republic, Soviet Union
- Party: United Russia
- Education: Russian University of Cooperation
- Awards: Order of Friendship

Andrey Vladimirovich Chibis (Russian: Андрей Владимирович Чибис; born 19 March 1979) is a Russian statesman and politician. He is currently the 5th Governor of Murmansk Oblast, since 27 September 2019. He was the acting governor of Murmansk Oblast on 21 March 2019 before officially sworn into office. He is the Secretary of the Murmansk regional branch of the United Russia party since 15 November 2019.

He was Deputy Minister of Construction, Housing and Utilities of Russia from 2013 to 2019, and formerly Chief State Housing Inspector of the Russian Federation 2014-2019. He has PhD in Law as of 2006.

Chibis was injured during a stabbing attack on 4 April 2024.

== Biography ==
=== Origin ===
Andrey Chibis was born in Cheboksary on 19 March 1979. His father, Vladimir Aleksandrovich Chibis, was the deputy general director of the Chapayev Cheboksary Production Association and lived with his parents in the Chapaevsky villageon Kirov Street. He also has a sister, Tatiana.

Chibis studied well at school; after graduating from the Cheboksary Lyceum No. 1 in 1996, he entered the law faculty of the Cheboksary Cooperative Institute (branch) of the Moscow University of Consumer Cooperatives, from which he graduated in 2001.

In 1996 he was registered as an individual entrepreneur. While studying at the institute, he married a student of the same institute, Yevgenya Vladimirovna Romanova, a stepdaughter of the co-owner and general director of Electropribor OJSC Gennady Medvedev. As a student, from 1999 to 2001 he was listed as a legal adviser of the State Unitary Subsidiary Enterprise "Taurus" FSUE "Cheboksary PO im. IN AND. Chapaev ", the director of which was his father.

In 2000, in Cheboksary, together with his sister Tatyana and his wife, he was among the founders of Garant-Consulting LLC., specializing in real estate audit and appraisal; involved in the creation of JSC "Mortgage Corporation of the Chuvash Republic". From 2001 to 2002 - postgraduate student of the Cheboksary Cooperative Institute. In November 2002, he was included in the composition of the co-founders of the Regional Branch of the Public Organization "Russian Association for the Development of Small and Medium Business" - the Chuvash Association for the Development of Small and Medium Business. From 2002 to 2004, he was listed as a lawyer at the Voronezh Inter-Territorial Bar Association.

He studied at the first stream of the "School of Governors" at the Institute "Higher School of Public Administration" RANEPA. In 2004, he completed training at the Chuvash State University named after I. N. Ulyanov under the program for training management personnel for organizations of the national economy of the Russia.

=== Ryazan - Cheboksary ===
In 2004, Chibis left for Ryazan in a team with the former mayor of the city of Cheboksary, Anatoly Igumnov, to participate in the election campaign of the candidate for the post of Governor of Ryazan Oblast, Georgy Shpak, as a lawyer at his campaign headquarters. After Georgy Shpak's victory in the elections, Anatoly Igumnov was appointed assistant to the governor of Ryazan Oblast, and Chibis was appointed advisor to the governor of Ryazan Oblast on legal issues. The losing candidate for governor Igor Morozov tried to challenge the election results, claiming that Shpak's team used the "black cash" during the gubernatorial elections. In an interview with the Kommersant newspaper, Chibis said that instead of submitting documents to the court, Igor Morozov demonstrates them to the “general public”, which “confirms the version that this is only a game and the creation of an information channel during the election campaign in the Ryazan Regional Duma". Later, Chibis was a witness at the trial, who examined the receipt of receipt by Chibis of funds for needs related to election work. In court, Chibis said that he had written the receipt in advance, just in case, but had actually received no money; emphasized that he did not receive money from Georgy Shpak for his work in the election headquarters - it was interesting for him to work 'from the point of view of experience and improving his image' .

In Ryazan, Chibis participated in the creation of OJSC Ryazan Mortgage Corporation, and was the chairman of the board of directors of the corporation. At the same time, Chibis was listed as an assistant to the State Duma deputy Pavel Semyonov. In 2005, as an adviser to the governor, he oversaw the elections to the Ryazan Regional Duma; was a member of the team representing the interests of Mikhail Babich, who was considered the main financier and organizer of the victory of Georgy Shpak in the second round of the 2004 elections. In 2005, he took part in a political campaign to approve Anatoly Igumnov as the mayor of Ryazan, but the deputies of the Ryazan City Council refused to support the proposed candidacy, because at the same time, many city council members announced "threats" from Chibis for refusing to support Igumnov. Chibis wrote a letter of resignation and on 12 August 2005, and was dismissed from his post as adviser to the governor of Ryazan Oblast.; в дальнейшем вернулся в Чебоксары.

Returning to Cheboksary, Chibis headed the election campaign of Igumnov as a candidate for the post of mayor of Cheboksary In the course of the election campaign, Igumnov withdrew his candidacy and was subsequently appointed deputy minister of urban planning and development of public infrastructure of the Chuvash Republic. In 2005, Chibis was then appointed head of the Expert Department created for him in the Administration of the President of the Chuvash Republic, headed by Enver Ablyakimov. In 2006, after defending a thesis on the topic "Heat supply agreement in Russian civil law" at the Volgograd Academy of the Ministry of Internal Affairs of Russia, he became a candidate of legal sciences; the dissertation was performed at the Department of Civil Law and Process of the Academy of Law and Management of the Federal Penitentiary Service. (Note: Научный руководитель — к. ю. н. Блинкова Елена Викторовна)

=== 2006—2013 ===
In 2006, he was appointed head of the department for support of the national project "Affordable Housing" of the Ministry of Regional Development of Russia.Since then in 2007, he was the head of the Department for the Development of the Affordable Housing Market of the Federal Agency for Construction, Housing and Communal Services. While working in the Ministry of Regional Development, he was responsible for developing a Long-term strategy for mass housing construction.

From 2008 to 2011, Chibis was the chairman of the board of directors, and a member of the management board, and director for Legal and Corporate Issues of JSC Russian Communal Systems (RKS), which his area of responsibility included the legal block of the company. Since June 2009, he was in the National Union of Vodokanals, a non-profit organization, as vice president of the association.

In May 2011, he was appointed executive director of the Institute for Socio-Economic and Political Research (ISEPI), a non-profit foundation, whose board of directors was chaired by Nikolay Fyodorov, a member of the Federation Council from the Chuvash Republic. In August 2011, he headed the Non-Profit Partnership Housing and Utilities Development. From 2012 to 2013, he was president and co-owner of ZhKKH-Development LLC in Moscow.

From August 2012 to 2014, he was listed as a member of the Expert Council under the Government of Russia, in which he headed the Working Group on the development of housing and communal services. In this position, he interacted with the apparatus of the Russian Government and with Deputy Prime Minister Dmitry Kozak in charge of the industry.

=== Work in the Ministry of Construction of Russia ===
From 6 December 2013 to 21 March 2019, Chibis was Deputy Minister of the Ministry of Construction and Housing and Utilities, in which he was responsible for housing and communal services, from 12 September 2014, at the same time, was the Chief State Housing Inspector of the Russia.

In 2016, Chibis headed the project "Formation of a comfortable urban environment". In November 2018, Chibis, as head of the Smart City project, was appointed a “digital deputy minister” - the deputy head of the Ministry of Construction of Russia responsible for digital development. Since December 2015, he was member of the Bureau of the Committee on Housing and Land Management of the United Nations Economic Commission for Europe.

In the Ministry of Construction of Russia, he oversaw the development of the Strategy for the Development of the Housing and Communal Services of the Russian Federation for the period up to 2020, issues of creating a comfortable urban environment. Since November 2018, he was responsible in the department for the digitalization of the urban economy, as well as ensuring uninterrupted household and drinking water supply to Crimea and Sevastopol.

== Governor of Murmansk Oblast ==
On 21 March 2019, by the Decree of the President of Russia, Chibis was appointed acting Governor of Murmansk Oblast. On 9 April 2019, he announced that he was going to become a candidate for governor of Murmansk Oblast in the elections in 2019. On Single Election Day, 8 September 2019, with a result of 60.07% in the first round of elections for the Governor of Murmansk Oblast, Chibis won the election. His term of office will end in September 2024.

On 27 September 2019, Chibis signed a decree on the appointment of Konstantin Dolgov as a representative from the executive body of state power of the region in the Federation Council.

In November 2019, he headed the regional branch of the United Russia party.

On 4 April 2024, Chibis was severely wounded after being stabbed while meeting with constituents in Apatity. He was temporarily replaced as governor by his deputy, Nadezhda Aksyonova. RBC reported that the suspect was a 42-year old local railway worker who said "he disliked the governor, although he did not know him personally,” during his interrogation, according to the Investigative Committee of Russia. The attack on Chibis is the first on a head of a federal subject of Russia since a suicide bombing that unsuccessfully targeted the head of Ingushetia, Yunus-bek Yevkurov, in 2009. Chibis was later discharged on 12 April.

== Personal life ==
Andrey Chibis is married to Yevgenya Vladimirovna and has two children, a daughter and a son both born in 2015. In 2019, their daughter Yelizaveta entered the children's theater school in Murmansk (department of "Basics of Acting and Directing"). Yevgenya is the candidate of economic sciences, economist and lawyer; works in the field of accounting, auditing and business consulting. She is the stepdaughter of Gennady Medvedev, the former co-owner and head from 1994 to 2010 of Electropribor OJSC, who until 1980 worked with Chibis's father at the Cheboksary PO named after V.I. Chapaev as a process engineer. The family lives in Murmansk since 2019 and also has a residence in Spain.

His father Vladimir Aleksandrovich, was the former deputy general director of the Cheboksary production association named after V. I. Chapaev, until 2019 owned Personnel Resource LLC (Cheboksary). Andrey's sister - Tatyana Vladimirovna Kretova - is listed as the founder of a dozen companies, including: Region Development LLC (audit), ZHKH-Development LLC (engaged in research in the field of waste management), GARANT-consulting LLC (accounting; owns OOO Sibgazstroy (construction of engineering networks)).

== Declared property ==
The total amount of declared income for 2017 was 2 million 573 thousand rubles, which both couples have 35 million 580 thousand rubles. Andrey's income for 2018 exceeded 16 million rubles, most of the funds received from the sale of real estate, for 13.3 million rubles. Together with his wife, Chibis owns a house (townhouse) in Spain with an area of 176 sq. m; there are also two apartments of 133 m² and 76.2 sq. m; Chibis has at his disposal two Porsche Cayenne and Mercedes-Benz cars, as well as a snowmobile and a snow and swamp vehicle. The income of Yevgenya in 2018 exceeded 1.6 million rubles; she owns an apartment with an area of 107.5 sq. m, living space 139.5 m² and three parking spaces.

All real estate and cars were purchased even before the transition to the civil service - during the period of work in the holding "Russian Communal Systems", where Chibis headed the legal block for 4 years.

=== Beliefs ===
Chibis is a supporter of tougher liability for late payment of housing and communal services: “It is also envisaged to toughen liability for late payment, including by the consumer of the service. Today he pays 1/300 of the refinancing rate, that's a penny. We conducted an analysis: today, most debtors are wealthy people, and the best payers are just pensioners, the poorest in terms of income, but the most responsible in terms of payments. And they pay for their neighbors.".

As the executive director of the NP "Housing and Public Utilities Development", Chibis said: “If the owner is not able to pay for major repairs ... - no question. ... If you cannot pay, maintain, save up for repairs - give the apartment back ... sell, buy a smaller one."

== Sanctions ==
On November 30, 2022, due to Russia’s invasion of Ukraine, he was added to the UK sanctions list, specifically for his involvement in the mobilization of military reservists in the Murmansk region.

On December 16, 2022, he was added to the European Union sanctions list for supporting and implementing policies that undermine the territorial integrity, sovereignty, and independence of Ukraine. The EU noted that Andrey Chibis is involved "in the unlawful transfer of Ukrainian children to Russia and their adoption by Russian families; his actions violate the rights of Ukrainian children and Ukrainian law".

On February 24, 2023, the U.S. Department of State added him to its sanctions list as a person involved in "carrying out Russian operations and aggression against Ukraine, as well as the unlawful administration of occupied Ukrainian territories in the interests of the Russian Federation", specifically for "mobilizing citizens for the war in Ukraine".

On April 1, 2023, he was included in Ukraine’s sanctions list for supporting the recognition of the Russian-controlled DPR and LPR, and for involvement "in the illegal removal of Ukrainian children to Russia and their adoption by Russian families".

He is also subject to sanctions by Switzerland, Australia, and New Zealand on similar grounds.

== Criticism and ratings ==
It is noted that Chibis, who began his career in the team of the first president of Chuvashia, Fyodorov, is considered a creature of the Russian entrepreneur Viktor Vekselberg.

According to the former chairman of the Cabinet of Ministers of the Chuvash Republic, Ablyakimov: "Andrei became an advisor <…> to the governor Gennady Shpak. He really wanted to use the Cheboksary developments, there was even an attempt to push Anatoly Igumnov's candidacy for the post of mayor of the regional center. The project failed, but Chibis with his organizational skills lit up. He was appointed head of the expert department in the presidential administration of the republic. True, his analytical reports with often impartial economic and political conclusions did not delight the then Prime Minister Sergey Gaplikov. Andrey had to leave, but he also had a brilliant career in Moscow." According to journalist Aleksander Belov (Cheboksary), "This is a rare case when a young man with potential and without protection from the top managed to go through such an official path."

According to political consultant Konstantin Kostin, “Chibis has excellent management experience at the federal level, in addition, he has the necessary support from the head of state. The main thing that Chibis has is the lack of anti-rating". Russian political scientist Mikhail Vinogradov noted that the fact of meeting other graduates of the presidential reserve training program plays in Chibis's favor: "It will also be useful for lobbying the interests of the Murmansk Oblaar at the federal level." The head of the Social Communications agency, political strategist Ilya Paimushkin expressed the opinion that “Chibis represents a modern type of a young, but highly qualified specialist at the federal level. He prefers openness in his work." The head of the Chuvash branch of the Patriots of Russia party, Vladislav Soldatov, noted: "Chibis is a PR man, he can speak beautifully, present beautifully," but "he is more a theoretician than a practitioner, he was not on the farm."

According to Yury Pavlenkov, member of the RF CCI committees on entrepreneurship in the housing and utilities sector and real estate economy, “Chibis's entire policy is aimed at ensuring the interests of a narrow oligarchic circle. And everything else is tailored precisely for this purpose". The President of the Association of Builders of Russia Nikolai Koshman noted that the Ministry of Construction of Russia does not have enough professionals, and one of those whom Koshman considers “non-professional”, he called on Deputy Minister for Housing and Utilities, Chibis.
