= Igor Misko =

Russian ice hockey player

- Born: 24 July 1986 Leningrad, RSFSR, Soviet Union
- Died: 6 July 2010 (aged 23) Kolpino, Saint Petersburg, Russia
- Height: 6 ft 0 in (183 cm)
- Weight: 189 lb (86 kg; 13 st 7 lb)
- Position: Left wing
- Shot: Left
- Played for: SKA Saint Petersburg
- Playing career: 2005–2010

Igor Vladimirovich Misko (24 July 1986 – 6 July 2010) was a Russian professional ice hockey player. He played with SKA Saint Petersburg in the Russian Superleague and in the Kontinental Hockey League. He also played for such hockey teams from Saint Petersburg as Izhorets, Lokomotiv and Spartak. He died on 6 July 2010 from cardiac arrest while driving in the Kolpino region of St. Petersburg. He crashed into another car, but was ruled dead from the heart failure.
