= Marina Kovtun =

Russian politician

- Марина Ковтун
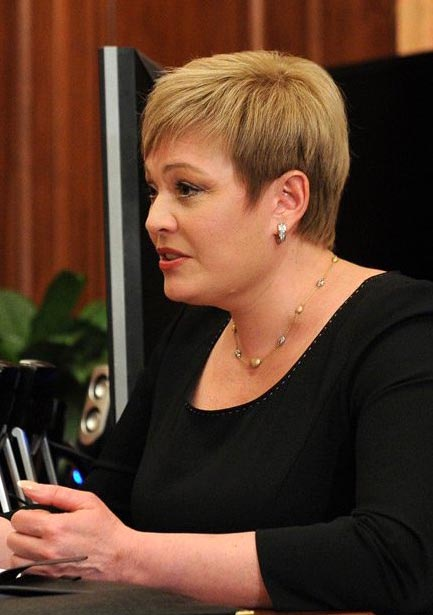
- Kovtun in 2014

4th Governor of Murmansk Oblast
- In office 12 April 2012 – 21 March 2019; Acting: 4–12 April 2012
- Preceded by: Dmitry Dmitriyenko
- Succeeded by: Andrey Chibis

Personal details
- Born: Marina Vasilievna Kovtun; Марина Васильевна Ковтун; March 10, 1962 (age 64) Murmansk city, Russian SFSR, USSR
- Citizenship: Russia
- Party: United Russia
- Spouse: Vasily Kovtun
- Relations: Vasiliy Tikhonovich Kozlov (father)
- Education: North-West Academy for State Services
- Profession: Politician

Marina Vasilievna Kovtun (Russian: Марина Васильевна Ковтун; born 10 March 1962) is a Russian politician who was Governor of Murmansk Oblast from April 2012 until March 2019. She worked in various Murmansk government agencies, including tourism management, prior to her appointment to the governorship in April 2012. Kovtun was the first female leader of Murmansk Oblast.

== Biography ==
Kovtun was born in Murmansk. In 2001 she graduated from North-West Academy for State Services as a specialist in Municipal and State Management. From 1986 she worked in the Murmansk District Committee of the Komsomol, and she was the head of Kola District.

From 1994 to 2005 she worked as deputy chairman of the Physical Culture, Sport and Tourism Committee for the Administration of Murmansk Oblast.

From 2005 she was the chief deputy of the local Department of the Federal Tourism Agency.

From 2006 to 2009 she led the Department for Tourism Development of the Directorate for Economics in the Murmansk Oblast Administration.

Until 2011 she was the deputy chairman of the "Kola GMK" Company.

In December 2011 she was elected to the Murmansk Oblast Duma, and she was the first deputy of the Chairman of Murmansk Oblast Duma.

=== Governor of Murmansk ===
In April 2012, Russian president Dmitry Medvedev appointed Kovtun as acting governor of Murmansk Oblast, when the previous governor, Dmitry Dmitriyenko, resigned from office.

Political offices
Preceded by Dmitry Dmitriyenko	Governor of Murmansk Oblast; 2012–2019	Succeeded by Andrey Chibis
