= Fridrikh Maryutin =

Soviet footballer and manager

Personal information
- Full name: Fridrikh Mikhaylovich Maryutin
- Date of birth: 7 October 1924
- Place of birth: Astrakhan, USSR
- Date of death: 9 September 2010 (aged 85)
- Place of death: Saint Petersburg, Russia
- Position: Striker

Senior career*
Years	Team	Apps	(Gls)
- Zenit Kaliningrad
- Kalininets Sverdlovsk
1947–1956	Zenit Leningrad	211	(46)
1957–1958	Avangard Leningrad		

International career
1952	USSR	1	(0)

Managerial career
- Admiralteyets Leningrad (assistant)
- Zenit Leningrad (assistant)
- SKA Leningrad
- LOMO Leningrad
- Komsomolets Leningrad
- * Club domestic league appearances and goals

Fridrikh Mikhailovich Maryutin (Russian: Фридрих Михайлович Марютин; October 7, 1924 – September 9, 2010) was a Soviet football player and manager. He was born in Astrakhan and died in Saint Petersburg. Maryutin played his only game for USSR on July 20, 1952 in a 1952 Olympics game against Yugoslavia.
