= Murmansk Oblast Duma =

Regional parliament of Murmansk Oblast, Russia

Murmansk Oblast Duma Мурманская областная дума
- 7th legislature

Type
- Type: Unicameral

Leadership
- Chairman: Sergey Dubovoy, United Russia since 5 October 2016

Structure
- Seats: 32
- Political groups: United Russia (25) CPRF (3); SRZP (2); LDPR (1) RPPSJ (1)

Elections
- Last election: 19 September 2021
- Next election: 2026

Meeting place
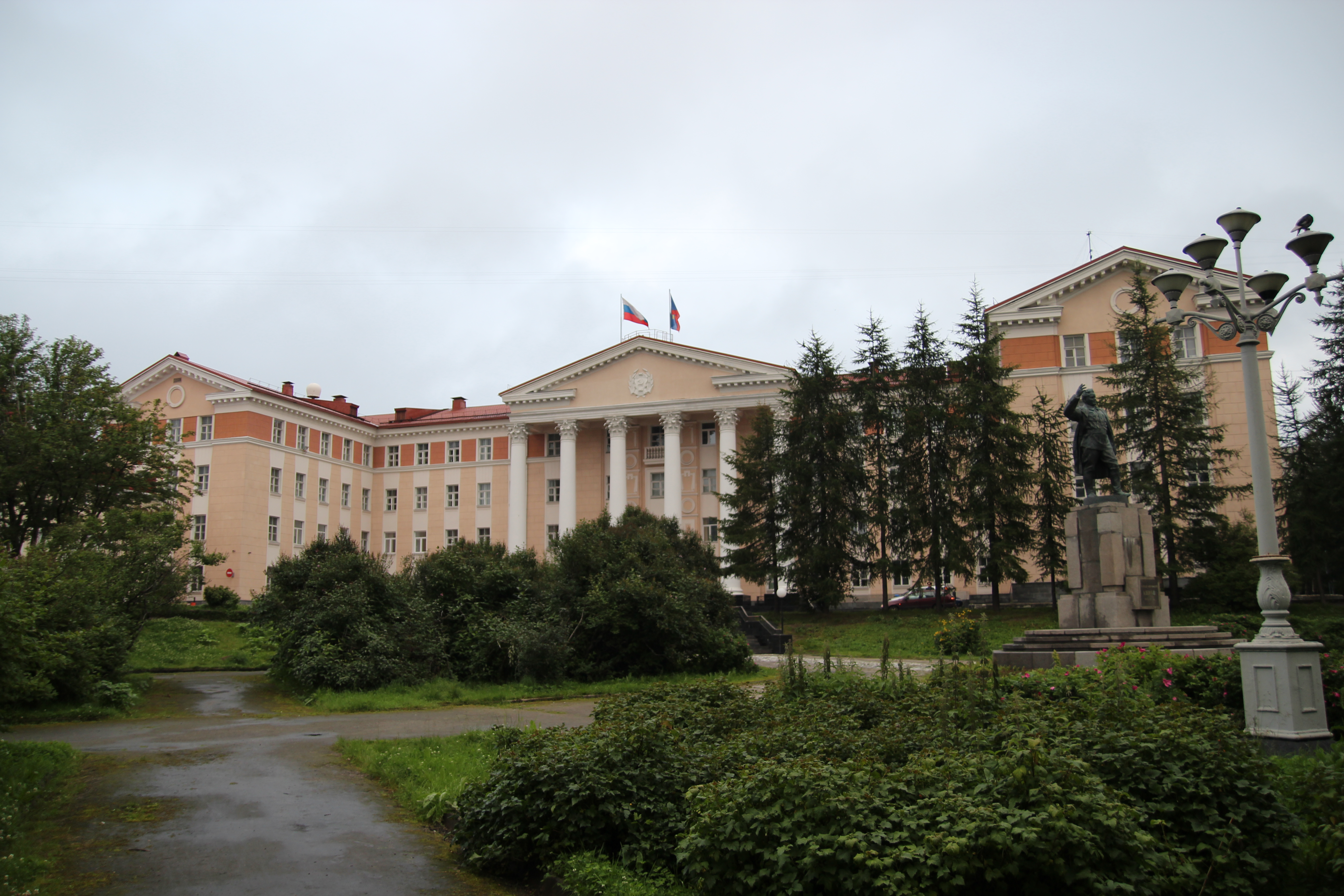
- 2, Sofia Perovskaya Street, Murmansk

Website
- duma-murman.ru

The Murmansk Oblast Duma (Russian: Мурманская областная дума) is the regional parliament of Murmansk Oblast, a federal subject of Russia. It consists of 32 deputies elected for five-year terms.

The most recent election was on 19 September 2021, which elected the seventh convocation.

== Elections ==
=== 2016 ===
Party	%	Seats
United Russia	39.20	25
Liberal Democratic Party of Russia	20.95	4
Communist Party of the Russian Federation	12.31	2
A Just Russia	10.23	1
Registered voters/turnout	39.20	

=== 2021 ===
Party	%	Seats
United Russia	36.02	25
Communist Party of the Russian Federation	19.58	3
A Just Russia — For Truth	16.99	2
Liberal Democratic Party of Russia	13.34	1
Russian Party of Pensioners for Social Justice	10.70	1
Registered voters/turnout	42.80	

== Leadership ==
- Sergey Dubovoy (United Russia) – Chairman of the Regional Duma.
- Vladimir Vladimirovich Mishchenko (United Russia) – First Deputy Chairman
- Natalia Nikolaevna Vedischeva (United Russia) – Deputy Chairman
- Vasily Vasilievich Omelchuk (United Russia) – Deputy Chairman

== Federation Council representatives ==
The Duma appoints one of the two representatives from Murmansk Oblast to the Federation Council. The current Duma appointee, incumbent since 7 October 2021, is Tatyana Sakharova. The oblast's other representative, Konstantin Dolgov, was appointed by the oblast's governor on 27 September 2019.
