= Zosimus Davydov =

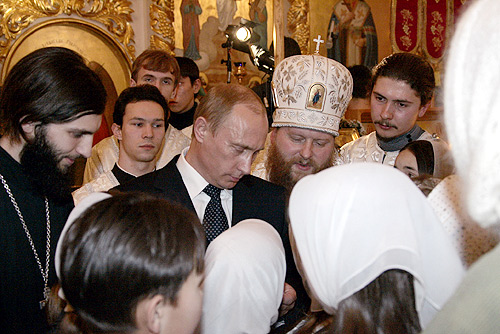

Zosimus (secular name Igor Vasilyevich Davydov, Russian: Игорь Васильевич Давыдов; 12 September 1963 – 9 May 2010) was the Russian Orthodox bishop of Yakutsk and Lensk, Russia.

He received his monastic tonsure on 16 December 1991, aged 28. He was ordained as a bishop on 27 September 2004.

He died in 2010, aged 46, from a heart attack.
