= Legislative Assembly of Novosibirsk Oblast =

Regional parliament of Novosibirsk Oblast, Russia

Legislative Assembly of Novosibirsk Oblast Законодательное собрание Новосибирской области
- 8th legislature

Type
- Type: Unicameral

Leadership
- Chairman: Andrei Shimkiv, United Russia since 29 September 2015

Structure
- Seats: 76
- Political groups: United Russia (51) CPRF (10); LDPR (4); New People (4); A Just Russia (4) RPPSJ (2)

Elections
- Last election: 2025 Novosibirsk Oblast legislative election
- Next election: 2030

Meeting place
- 3 Kirova Street, Novosibirsk

Website
- zsnso.ru

The Legislative Assembly of Novosibirsk Oblast (Russian: Законода́тельное собра́ние Новосибирской области) is the regional parliament of Novosibirsk Oblast, a federal subject of Russia. A total of 76 deputies are elected for five-year terms.

According to the Charter Of Novosibirsk Oblast, the Legislative Assembly is "the standing, supreme and exclusive legislative (representative) authority" of the Oblast. The Assembly is responsible for appointing the governor of the region and voting for or against a candidate proposed by the President of Russian Federation.

== Elections ==
=== 2015 ===
| Party | % | Seats |
|---|---|---|
| United Russia | 44.56 | 51 |
| Communist Party of the Russian Federation | 24.52 | 15 |
| A Just Russia | 10.63 | 5 |
| Liberal Democratic Party of Russia | 10.33 | 4 |
| Civic Platform | 1.86 | 1 |
| Registered voters/turnout | 30.71 | |

=== 2020 ===
| Party | % | Seats |
|---|---|---|
| United Russia | 38.13 | 45 |
| Communist Party of the Russian Federation | 16.63 | 13 |
| Liberal Democratic Party of Russia | 13.58 | 6 |
| New People | 6.92 | 3 |
| A Just Russia | 6.12 | 2 |
| Russian Party of Pensioners for Social Justice | 5.69 | 2 |
| Self-nominated | — | 3 |
| Rodina | — | 2 |
| Registered voters/turnout | 28.25 | |

=== 2025 ===
| Party | % | Seats |
|---|---|---|
| United Russia | 51.91 | 51 |
| Communist Party of the Russian Federation | 11.21 | 10 |
| Liberal Democratic Party of Russia | 9.33 | 4 |
| New People | 7.91 | 4 |
| A Just Russia | 7.78 | 4 |
| Russian Party of Pensioners for Social Justice | 6.63 | 2 |
| Registered voters/turnout | 33.02 | |

== List of chairmen ==
| Name | Took office | Left office |
|---|---|---|
| Anatoly Sychev | 1994 | 1997 |
| Viktor Leonov | 1997 | 2005 |
| Alex Bespalikov | 2005 | 2010 |
| Ivan Moroz | 2010 | 2015 |
| Andrei Shimkiv | 2015 | – |
