= Viktor Tolokonsky =

Russian politician

- Виктор Толоконский
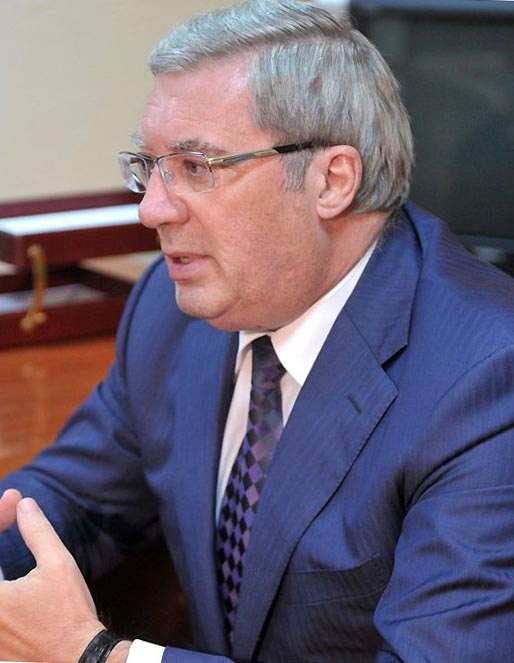
- Tolokonsky in 2013

6th Governor of Krasnoyarsk Krai
- In office 12 May 2014 – 27 September 2017
- Preceded by: Lev Kuznetsov
- Succeeded by: Aleksandr Uss

Presidential Envoy to the Siberian Federal District
- In office 9 September 2010 – 12 May 2014
- President: Dmitry Medvedev; Vladimir Putin
- Preceded by: Anatoly Kvashnin
- Succeeded by: Nikolay Rogozhkin

Governor of Novosibirsk Oblast
- In office 14 January 2000 – 9 September 2010
- Preceded by: Vitaly Mukha
- Succeeded by: Vasily Yurchenko

Mayor of Novosibirsk
- In office March 1996 – January 2000
- Preceded by: Office established
- Succeeded by: Vladimir Gorodetsky

Personal details
- Born: May 27, 1953 (age 73) Novosibirsk, Russia
- Party: United Russia
- Education: Novosibirsk State University of Economics and Management
- Profession: Politician

Viktor Aleksandrovich Tolokonsky (Russian: Виктор Александрович Толоконский, born 27 May 1953) is a Russian politician. He has the federal state civilian service rank of 1st class Active State Councillor of the Russian Federation.

== Biography ==
He graduated from the Novosibirsk State University of Economics and Management with specialist degree in economics in 1974.

In 1993 he was elected as the head of the Novosibirsk administration, and as mayor of the Novosibirsk city when this position was established in 1996.

He served as mayor until 2000, when he was elected as governor of Novosibirsk Oblast. In 2003 he was reelected. On 6 July 2007 Russia's President Vladimir Putin reappointed him for further five-year term. As a governor, he also had a seat on the Federation Council of the Federal Assembly of the Russian Federation til 2001 when the new law regulating the order of the formation of the Federation Council entered into force.

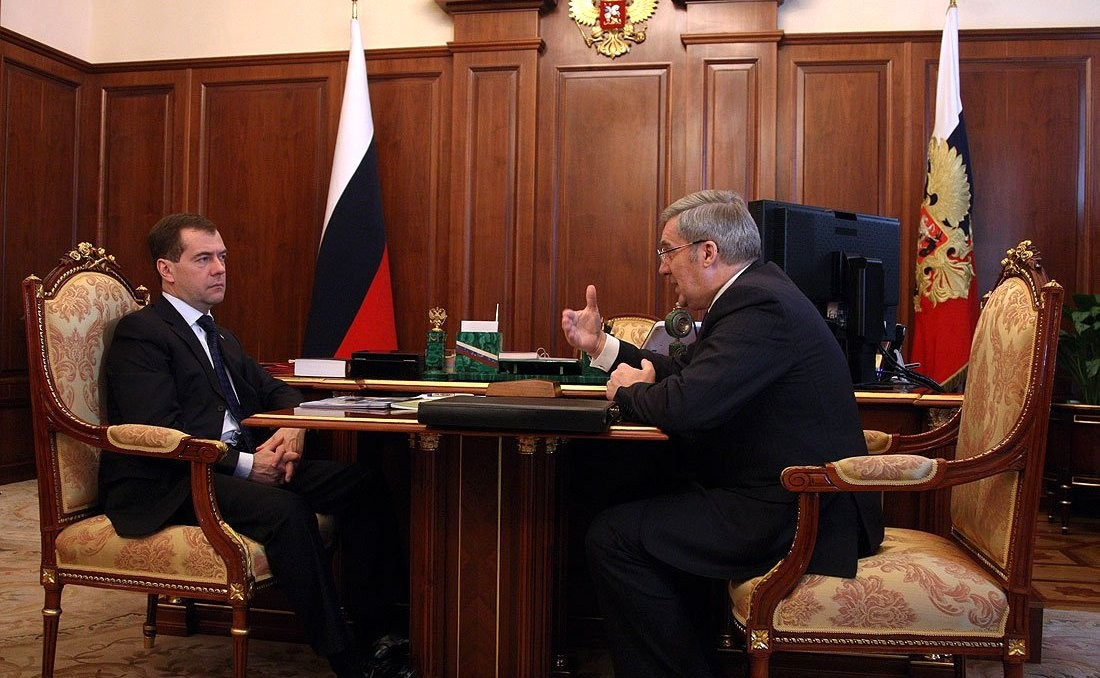
With Dmitry Medvedev, 18 March 2010

In 2010 Tolokonsky resigned as governor and was appointed to the Presidential Envoy to the Siberian Federal District. He was in office til 2014 when he became a governor of Krasnoyarsk Krai. In 2017, he retired from that position voluntary.

He was a member of the Presidium of the State Council from 2002 to 2003, in 2008, and from 2015 to 2016. Also, as a Presidential Envoy to the Siberian Federal District, he was a member of the Security Council of Russia from 2010 to 2014.

== Awards ==
- He was awarded the orders "For Services to the Fatherland" of the IV degree, Alexander Nevsky, Honor, Friendship, St. Sergius of Radonezh of the I degree, the medal "For Merits in conducting the All-Russian Population Census" and the gold badge of honor "Public Recognition".
- Winner of the national award "The best Governors of Russia".
- In 2010 he was awarded a Certificate of Honor by the President of the Russian Federation for his active participation in the preparation and holding of meetings of the State Council of the Russian Federation.
- Commemorative sign "For work for the benefit of the city" (Novosibirsk, 2013).
