= Vasily Yurchenko =

Russian politician

- Василий Юрченко
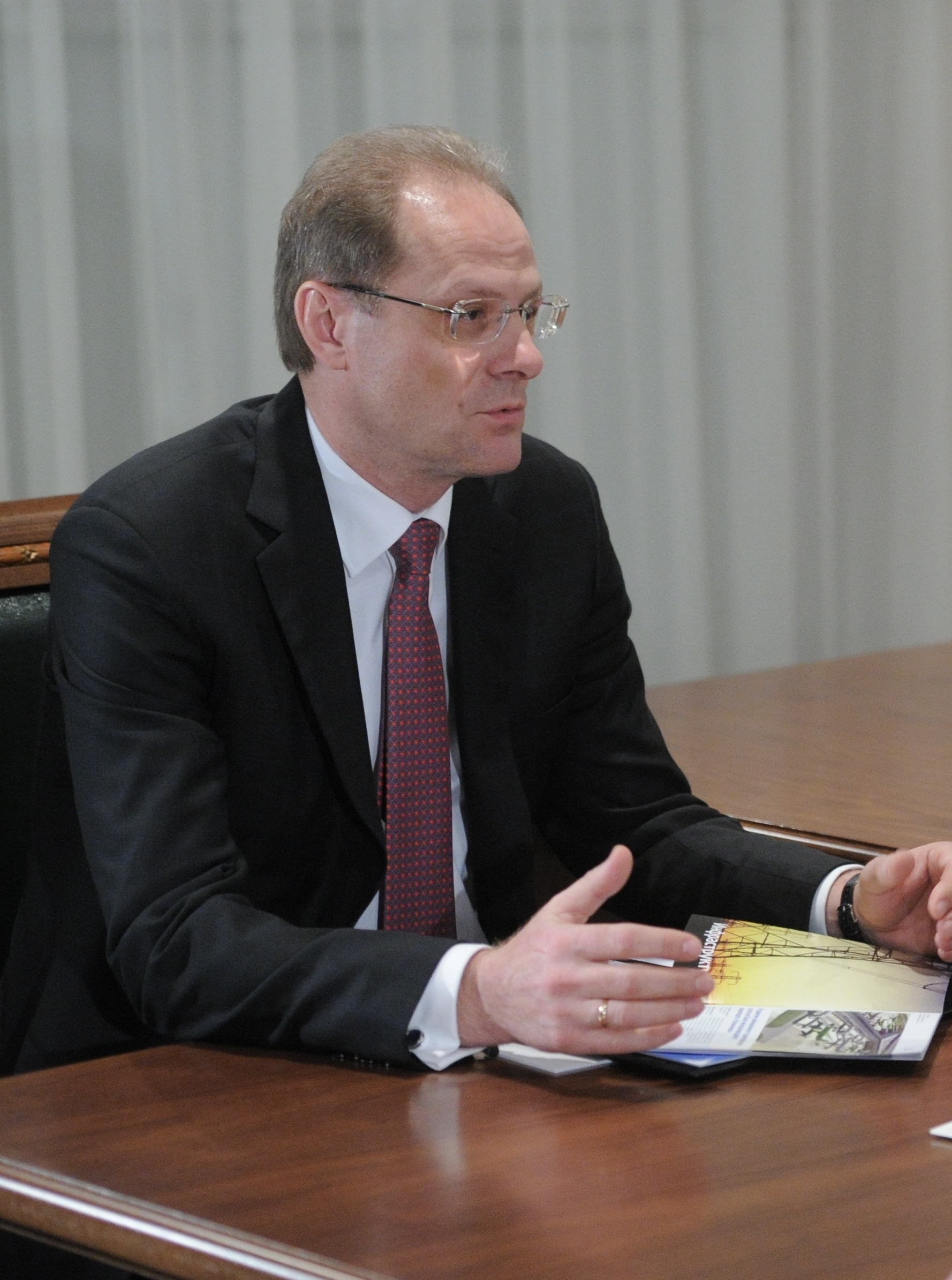
- Yurchenko in 2011

Governor of Novosibirsk Oblast
- In office September 22, 2010 – March 17, 2014
- Preceded by: Viktor Tolokonsky
- Succeeded by: Vladimir Gorodetsky

Personal details
- Born: September 26, 1960 (age 65) Karasuk, Russia
- Party: United Russia
- Profession: Politician

Vasily Alexeyevich Yurchenko (Russian: Василий Юрченко, born September 26, 1960) is a Russian politician. Governor in Novosibirsk Oblast (2010—2014).

== Biography ==
Vasily Yurchenko was born in Karasuk on September 26, 1960.

He graduated from the Novosibirsk State Academy of Water Transport in 1982. Candidate of technical sciences.

In January 2004, he was appointed to the post of head of the Department for the Development of Industry and Entrepreneurship of the Administration of the Novosibirsk Oblast.

In February 2005, he was appointed First Deputy Governor of the Novosibirsk Region.

On September 9, 2010, by decree of the President of the Russian Federation, Dmitry Medvedev was appointed interim governor of the Novosibirsk Oblast; on September 22 of the same year, he was approved.

On March 17, 2014, he was relieved of his post by President of the Russian Federation Vladimir Putin due to the loss of confidence.

== Family ==
He is married and has two children.

== Awards ==
2013 - Order of St. Sergius of Radonezh, II degree
