= Alexander Aksyonenko =

Russian ice hockey player (born 1986)

- Aлександр Аксёненко
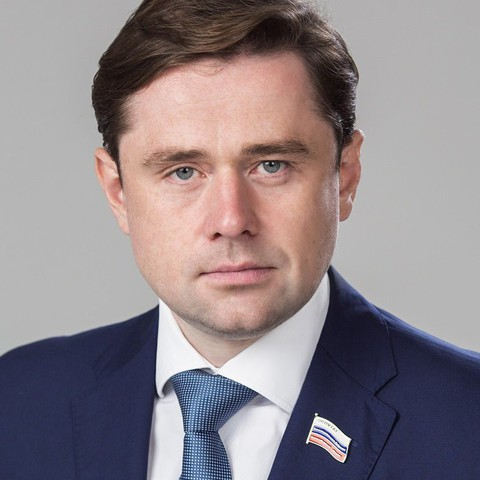
- official portrait, circa 2021

Member of the State Duma for Novosibirsk Oblast
- Incumbent
- Assumed office 12 October 2021
- Preceded by: Aleksandr Karelin
- Constituency: Iskitim (No. 137)

Personal details
- Born: 8 March 1986 (age 40) Novosibirsk, RSFSR, USSR
- Party: A Just Russia – For Truth
- Education: Siberian State Transport University; Novosibirsk State University (MBA)
Ice hockey career
- Height: 183 cm (6 ft 0 in)
- Weight: 89 kg (196 lb; 14 st 0 lb)
- Position: Defence
- Shot: Left
- Played for: Metallurg Novokuznetsk; Amur Khabarovsk; Avtomobilist Yekaterinburg; HC Sibir Novosibirsk
- Playing career: 2002–2014

Alexander Sergeevich Aksyonenko sometimes transliterated Aksenenko (Russian: Александр Сергеевич Аксёненко; born March 8, 1986) is a Russian professional ice hockey defenceman and politician. Since 2021, he has been a deputy of the State Duma, the lower house of the Russian Parliament.

He made his Kontinental Hockey League (KHL) debut playing with Amur Khabarovsk during the 2008–09 KHL season.

== Early Life and Sports Career ==
Alexander Sergeyevich Aksenenko was born on 8 March 1986 in Novosibirsk, USSR. From an early age, he showed a strong interest in ice hockey and devoted himself to the sport. Alexander ended his playing career in 2013, although he still had an active contract with the Novokuznetsk hockey club Metallurg.

== Work in the State Duma ==
After retiring from professional sports, Alexander Aksenenko remained actively involved in public life. In 2021, he became a member of the 8th State Duma of the Federal Assembly of the Russian Federation. He was elected from constituency No. 137, representing the Iskitim District and part of the Novosibirsk Region.
