= Andrey Travnikov =

Russian politician (born 1971)

- Андрей Травников
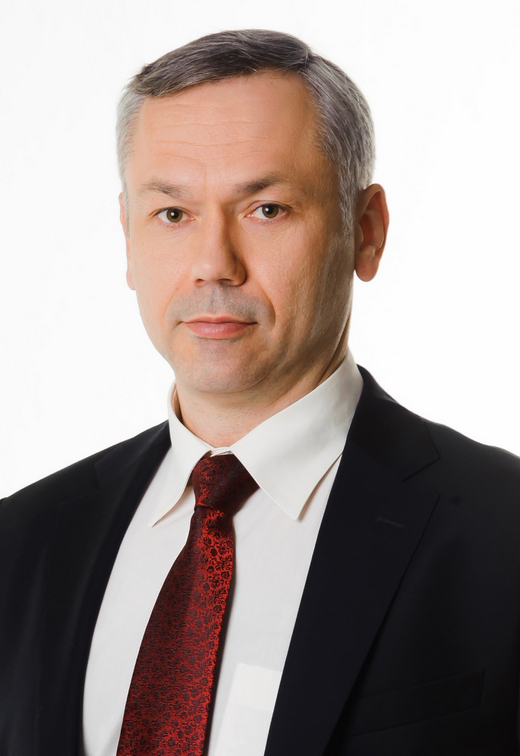

Governor of Novosibirsk Oblast
- Incumbent
- Assumed office September 14, 2018
- Preceded by: Vladimir Gorodetsky

Mayor of Vologda
- In office November 7, 2016 – October 6, 2017
- Preceded by: Evgeny Shulepov
- Succeeded by: Sergey Voropanov

Personal details
- Born: February 1, 1971 (age 55) Cherepovets, Vologda Oblast, RSFSR, USSR
- Party: United Russia
- Education: Cherepovets State University, RANEPA
- Profession: Politician

Andrey Alexandrovich Travnikov (Russian: Андрей Александрович Травников; born February 1, 1971) is a Russian politician. He is the current Governor of Novosibirsk Oblast.

== Awards ==
- Order of Friendship (February 12, 2021) — for the achieved labor successes and many years of conscientious work.
- Medal "For strengthening the military community" (Ministry of Defence)

== Family ==
Andrey Travnikov is married to Lyudmila, she is a housewife.

They have two children: son Dmitry and daughter Daria.
