= Vladimir Gorodetsky =

Russian politician (born 1948)

- Владимир Городецкий
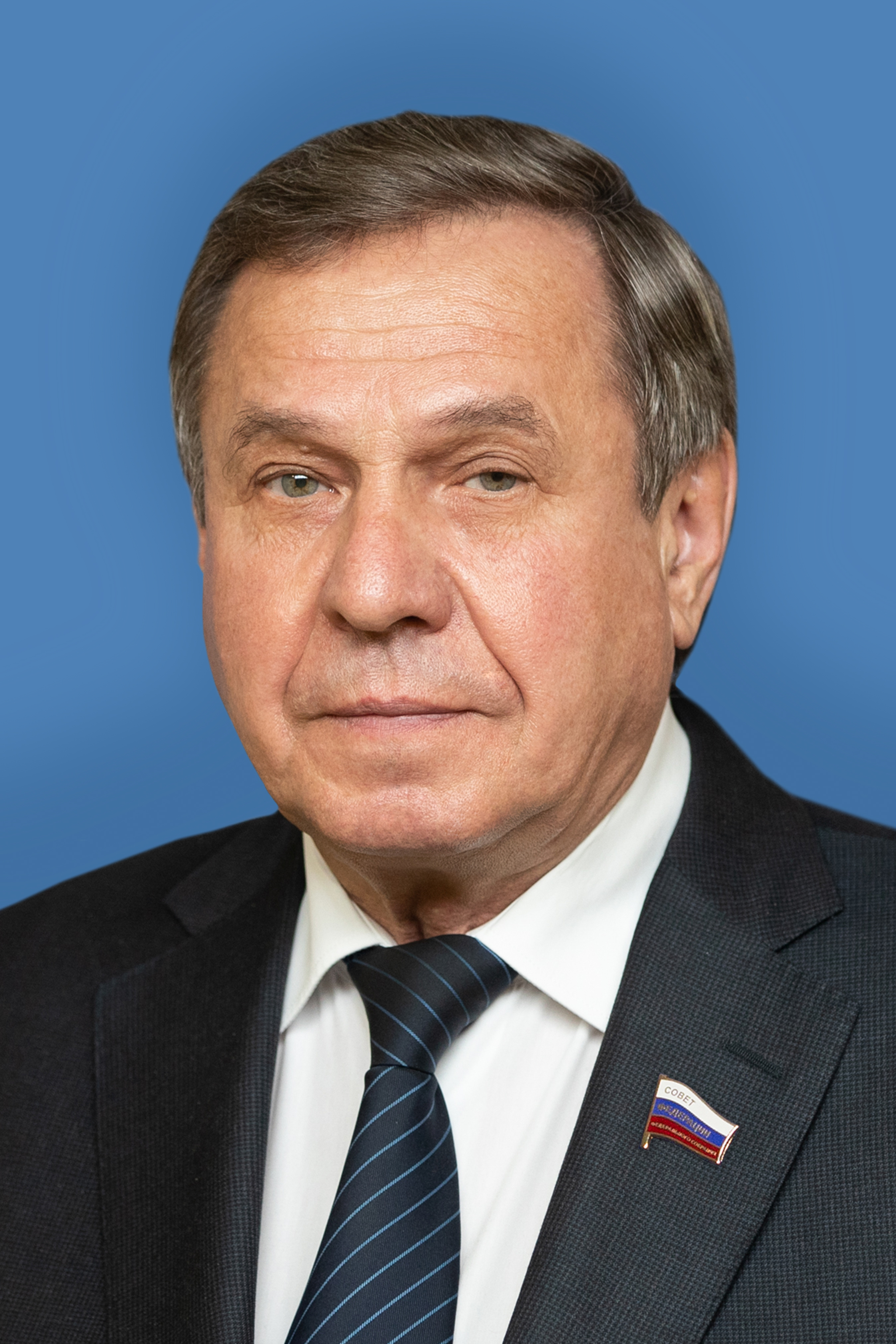
- Gorodetsky in 2014

Russian Federation Senator from Novosibirsk Oblast
- Incumbent
- Assumed office 1 October 2018
- Preceded by: Nadezhda Boltenko

Governor of Novosibirsk Oblast
- In office September 27, 2014 – October 6, 2017; Acting from March 18, 2014
- Preceded by: Vasily Yurchenko
- Succeeded by: Andrey Travnikov

Mayor of Novosibirsk
- In office March 26, 2000 – January 9, 2014
- Preceded by: Viktor Tolokonsky
- Succeeded by: Vladimir Znatkov

Personal details
- Born: June 11, 1948 (age 78) Aleksino, Pochinkovsky District, Smolensk Oblast, Russia
- Party: United Russia
- Education: Bryansk State Technical University
- Profession: Politician

Vladimir Filippovich Gorodetsky (Russian: Влади́мир Фили́ппович Городе́цкий, IPA: [vlɐˈdʲimʲɪr ɡərɐˈdʲetskʲɪj]; born July 11, 1948) is a Russian politician serving as a Senator from the executive authority of Novosibirsk Oblast since 2018. He had previously served three terms as mayor of Novosibirsk, Russia from 2000 to 2014 and was the governor of Novosibirsk Oblast from 2014 to 2017.

== Biography ==
Gorodetsky first moved to Novosibirsk in 1972, and spent ten years in the construction industry before being elected to leadership roles in local Communist Party organizations. In the 1990s he spent a few years in business again, but in 1996 he was appointed first deputy mayor under Viktor Tolokonsky, who later became the Governor of Novosibirsk Oblast, and was responsible for economics, investment and industrial policy.

He was elected mayor of Novosibirsk, Russia in 2000, and re-elected on March 28, 2004 with 58% of the vote in a run-off against Yakov London. He was elected to a third term in March 2009.

Gorodetsky was also president of the Association of Siberian and Far-Eastern Cities, a member of the Board of the Congress of Municipalities of the Russian Federation from 2003 to 2014 and work with the Euro-Asia section of the worldwide United Cities and Local Governments organisation.

He was considered for the 2008 World Mayor award.

In March 2014, Gorodetsky was appointed as acting governor of Novosibirsk Oblast to replace Vasily Yurchenko, who resigned. He was confirmed in the post by popular vote in September of that year, taking 65% of the votes. He resigned from the position in October 2017.

He is married, and has a grown-up son, a daughter, and four grandchildren.

=== Sanctions ===
He was sanctioned by the UK government in 2022 in relation to the Russo-Ukrainian War.

== Awards ==
- Order of Alexander Nevsky (August 17, 2023) — for his great contribution to the development of parliamentarism, active legislative activity and many years of conscientious work;
- Order of Honour (April 26, 2007) — for achieved labor achievements and many years of conscientious work;
- Medal of the Order "For Merit to the Fatherland" II degree (July 28, 1998) — for services to the state, long-term conscientious work and a great contribution to strengthening friendship and cooperation between peoples;
- Russian Federation Presidential Certificate of Honour (July 29, 2008) — for his great contribution to the socio-economic development of the city and many years of conscientious work.
