= Konstantin Dolgov =

Russian politician (born 1968)

- Константин Долгов
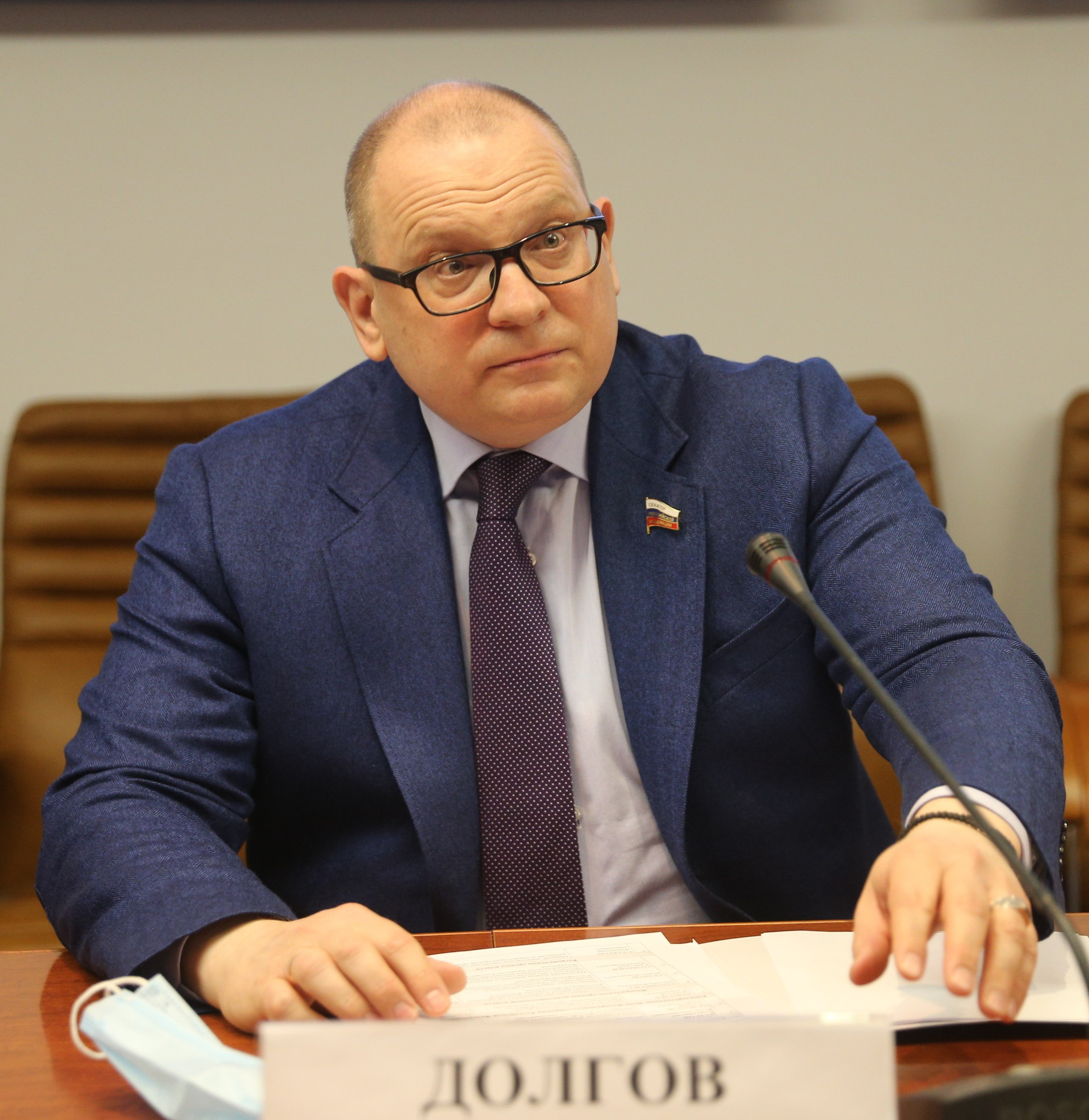

Senator from the Murmansk Oblast
- Incumbent
- Assumed office 27 September 2019
- Preceded by: Igor Chernyshenko

Personal details
- Born: Konstantin Dolgov; 12 August 1968 (age 58) Moscow, Russian Soviet Federative Socialist Republic, Soviet Union
- Party: United Russia
- Education: Moscow State Institute of International Relations

Konstantin Konstantinovich Dolgov (Russian: Константин Константинович Долгов; born 12 August 1968) is a Russian politician serving as a senator from the Murmansk Oblast since 27 September 2019.

== Career ==
Konstantin Dolgov was born on 12 August 1968 in Moscow. In 1990, he graduated from the Moscow State Institute of International Relations. Afterward, he worked at the Ministry of Foreign Affairs. In 1993, he was a part of the Russian delegation at the Organization for Security and Co-operation in Europe. From 1995 to 2000, Dolgov served as an advisor to Permanent Mission of the Russian Federation to the United Nations in New York City. From 2000 to 2004, he served as deputy director to the Department of International Organizations of the Ministry of Foreign Affairs of Russia. In 2011, Dolgov was appointed Commissioner of the Russian Ministry of Foreign Affairs for Human Rights, Democracy and the Rule of Law, Ambassador-at-Large of the Ministry of Foreign Affairs of the Russian Federation. In 2017, he started worked at the Presidential Administration of Russia. On 27 September 2019, he became the senator from the Murmansk Oblast.

== Sanctions ==
Konstantin Dolgov is under personal sanctions introduced by the European Union, the United Kingdom, the USA, Canada, Switzerland, Australia, Ukraine, New Zealand, for ratifying the decisions of the "Treaty of Friendship, Cooperation and Mutual Assistance between the Russian Federation and the Donetsk People's Republic and between the Russian Federation and the Luhansk People's Republic" and providing political and economic support for Russia's annexation of Ukrainian territories.
