= Shipunovo =

Shipunovo (Russian: Шипуново) is the name of several rural localities in Russia:

- Shipunovo, Rossiysky Selsoviet, Shipunovsky District, Altai Krai, a selo in Rossiysky Selsoviet of Shipunovsky District of Altai Krai
- Shipunovo, Shipunovsky Selsoviet, Shipunovsky District, Altai Krai, a selo in Shipunovsky Selsoviet of Shipunovsky District of Altai Krai
- Shipunovo, Ust-Pristansky District, Altai Krai, a selo in Ust-Pristansky Selsoviet of Ust-Pristansky District of Altai Krai
- Shipunovo, Novosibirsk Oblast, a selo in Suzunsky District of Novosibirsk Oblast
- Shipunovo, Omsk Oblast, a selo in Shipunovsky Rural Okrug of Krutinsky District of Omsk Oblast
- Shipunovo, Babushkinsky District, Vologda Oblast, a village in Podbolotny Selsoviet of Babushkinsky District of Vologda Oblast
- Shipunovo, Sokolsky District, Vologda Oblast, a village in Vorobyevsky Selsoviet of Sokolsky District of Vologda Oblast
