= Iskitim constituency =

Legislative constituency in Russia

Iskitim single-member constituency
- Constituency of the Russian State Duma

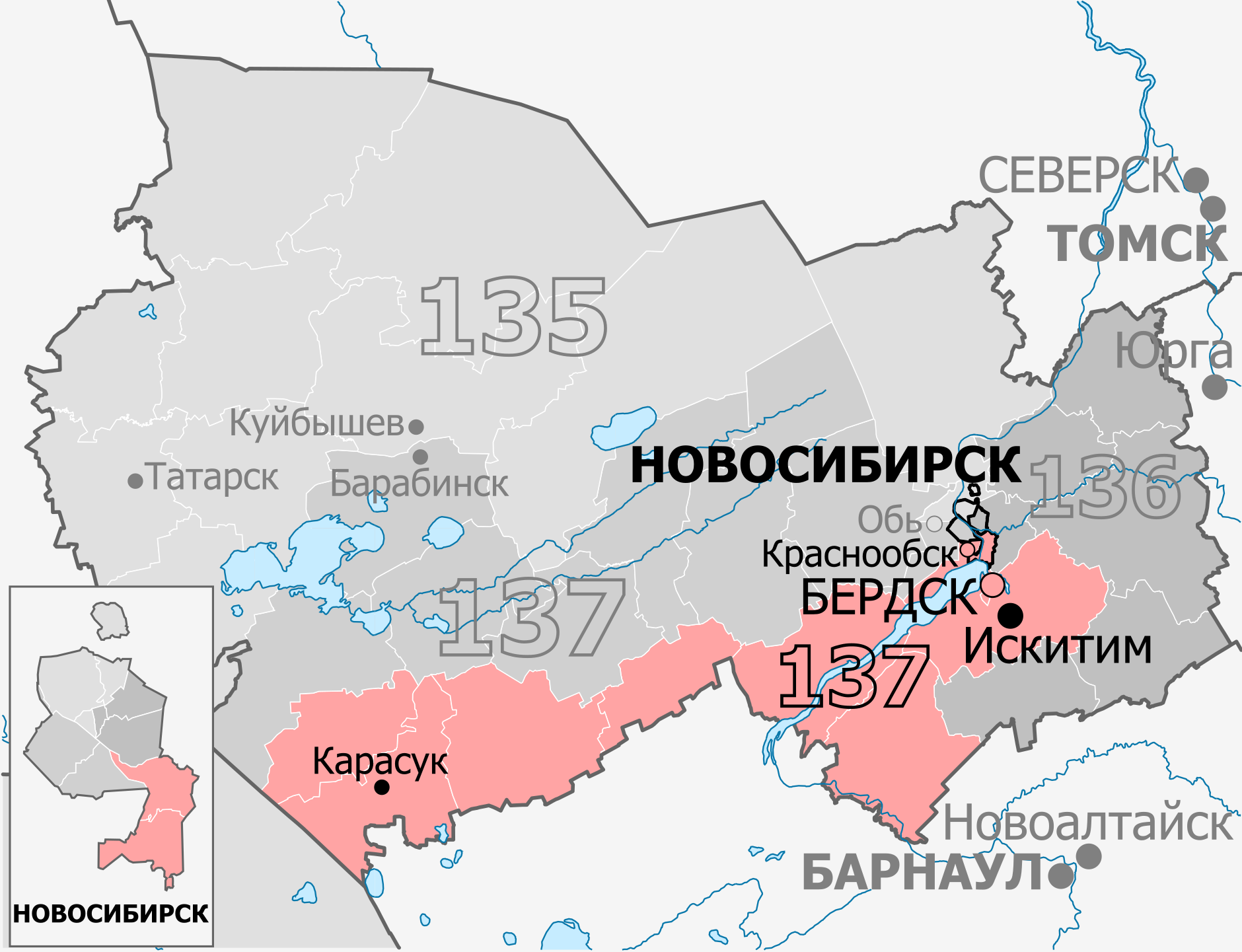
- Constituency boundaries since 2016
- Deputy: Aleksandr Aksyonenko; A Just Russia
- Federal subject: Novosibirsk Oblast
- Districts: Bagansky, Berdsk, Iskitim, Iskitimsky, Karasuksky, Kochkovsky, Krasnozyorsky, Novosibirsk (Pervomaysky, Sovetsky), Novosibirsky (Borovskoy, Krasnoobsk, Michurinsky, Morskoy), Ordynsky, Suzunsky
- Voters: 520,593 (2026)

The Iskitim constituency (No.139 (Note: No.127 in 1993-2007, No.137 in 2016–2026)) is a Russian legislative constituency in Novosibirsk Oblast. The constituency covers southern Novosibirsk, its suburbs Berdsk and Iskitim as well as rural southern Novosibirsk Oblast.

The constituency has been represented since 2021 by A Just Russia deputy Aleksandr Aksyonenko, former professional ice hockey player and nephew of former Deputy Prime Minister of Russia Nikolay Aksyonenko, who won the open seat, left vacant by the resignation of five-term United Russia deputy Aleksandr Karelin.

== Boundaries ==
1993–2007: Berdsk, Bolotninsky District, Cherepanovsky District, Iskitim, Iskitimsky District, Maslyaninsky District, Moshkovsky District, Novosibirsk (Sovetsky), Novosibirsky District, Suzunsky District, Toguchinsky District
The constituency covered southern Novosibirsk proper, all of the city suburbs, completely surrounding Zavodskoy and Zaeyltsovsky constituencies, satellite cities Berdsk and Iskitim as well as rural eastern Novosibirsk Oblast.

2016–present: Bagansky District, Berdsk, Iskitim, Iskitimsky District, Karasuksky District, Kochkovsky District, Krasnozyorsky District, Novosibirsk (Pervomaysky, Sovetsky), Novosibirsky District (Borovskoy, Krasnoobsk, Michurinsky, Morskoy), Ordynsky District, Suzunsky District
The constituency was re-created for the 2016 election and retained only Sovetsky City District of Novosibirsk and its southern suburbs, losing eastern Novosibirsk Oblast to new Central constituency, while Novosibirsky District was partitioned between Central, Novosibirsk and Barabinsk constituencies. This seat took Pervomaysky City District from the dissolved Zavodskoy constituency as well as rural strip of southern Novosibirsk Oblast from Suzun to Bagan from Barabinsk constituency.

== Members elected ==
Election	Member	Party
1993	Ivan Starikov (Note: appointed Deputy Minister of Economy of Russia in May 1995)	Choice of Russia
1995	Yevgeny Loginov	Liberal Democratic Party
1999	Lyubov Shvets	Communist Party
2003	Lyubov Shvets	Communist Party
2007	Proportional representation - no election by constituency	
2011	Proportional representation - no election by constituency	
2016	Aleksandr Karelin (Note: elected to the Federation Council (Russia) in September 2020)	United Russia
2021	Aleksandr Aksyonenko	A Just Russia
2026	Aleksandr Aksyonenko	A Just Russia

== Election results ==
=== 1993 ===
Summary of the 12 December 1993 Russian legislative election in the Iskitim constituency
Candidate	Party	Votes	%
Ivan Starikov	Choice of Russia	66,545	25.31%
Vladimir Karpov	Independent	34,910	13.28%
Yevgeny Loginov	Liberal Democratic Party	31,613	12.02%
Pavel Isayev	Independent	25,823	9.82%
Igor Kim	Russian Democratic Reform Movement	16,696	6.35%
Vladimir Anufriyenko	Yavlinsky–Boldyrev–Lukin	9,773	3.72%
Anatoly Kondratov	Independent	8,295	3.15%
Nikolay Petrov	Democratic Party	8,115	3.10%
Pyotr Fisenko	Independent	5,455	2.07%
against all		35,991	13.69%
Total		262,951	100%

=== 1995 ===
Summary of the 17 December 1995 Russian legislative election in the Iskitim constituency
Candidate	Party	Votes	%
Yevgeny Loginov	Liberal Democratic Party	87,537	24.39%
Leonid Bochkarev	Communist Party	59,846	16.67%
Ivan Starikov	Independent	53,106	14.80%
Aleksey Manannikov	Independent	49,820	13.88%
Georgy Ivashchenko	Independent	18,111	5.05%
Nikolay Krasnikov	Democratic Choice of Russia – United Democrats	14,368	4.00%
Sergey Sverchkov	Independent	9,997	2.79%
Yelena Malygina	Yabloko	9,103	2.54%
Leonid Goldyrev	Agrarian Party	6,163	1.72%
Aleksandr Terentyev	Independent	4,853	1.35%
Aleksey Pavlenko	Forward, Russia!	4,345	1.21%
Yury Yefimtsev	Congress of Russian Communities	4,137	1.15%
Vladimir Getmanov	Independent	3,083	0.86%
Oleg Chashkov	Independent	3,013	0.86%
Vladimir Anufriyenko	Social Democrats	2,180	0.61%
against all		22,168	6.18%
Total		358,944	100%

=== 1999 ===
Summary of the 19 December 1999 Russian legislative election in the Iskitim constituency
Candidate	Party	Votes	%
Lyubov Shvets	Communist Party	99,190	28.75%
Sergey Kibirev	Independent	34,733	10.07%
Liana Pepelyayeva	Independent	32,945	9.55%
Konstantin Aseyev	Independent	28,481	8.25%
Oleg Gonzharov	Our Home – Russia	24,340	7.05%
Aleksandr Drugov	Union of Right Forces	15,880	4.60%
Anatoly Chechin	Fatherland – All Russia	12,587	3.65%
Sergey Moskalev	Independent	11,635	3.37%
Vladimir Sablin	Independent	11,182	3.24%
Nadezhda Glukhova	Independent	9,273	2.69%
Vladimir Fofanov	Independent	4,596	1.33%
Andrey Tikhomirov	Andrey Nikolayev and Svyatoslav Fyodorov Bloc	3,484	1.01%
Anatoly Shabanov	Spiritual Heritage	3,139	0.91%
Oleg Chashkov	Independent	1,584	0.46%
against all		45,354	13.14%
Total		345,050	100%

=== 2003 ===
Results by district: Lyubov Shvets: 20–30% 30–40%; Andrey Shimkiv: 20–30% 30–40% 40–50% 60–70%

Summary of the 7 December 2003 Russian legislative election in the Iskitim constituency
Candidate	Party	Votes	%
Lyubov Shvets (incumbent)	Communist Party	75,374	24.78%
Andrey Shimkiv	Independent	71,404	23.48%
Yevgeny Loginov	Liberal Democratic Party	37,731	12.41%
Nikolay Krasnikov	Party of Russia's Rebirth-Russian Party of Life	34,757	11.43%
Tatyana Novaya	Independent	13,735	4.52%
Aleksandr Rudnitsky	Yabloko	8,732	2.87%
Yegor Ternovykh	Union of Right Forces	7,401	2.43%
Sergey Siganov	United Russian Party Rus'	1,685	0.55%
against all		44,063	14.49%
Total		304,559	100%

=== 2016 ===
Summary of the 18 September 2016 Russian legislative election in the Iskitim constituency
Candidate	Party	Votes	%
Aleksandr Karelin	United Russia	87,324	44.58%
Aleksandr Abalakov	Communist Party	32,041	16.36%
Oleg Suvorov	Liberal Democratic Party	24,450	12.53%
Danil Ivanov	A Just Russia	16,452	8.40%
Lyudmila Loskutova	Communists of Russia	8,280	4.23%
Yegor Savin	People's Freedom Party	5,980	3.05%
Mikhail Khazin	Rodina	5,503	2.81%
Igor Yazykovsky	The Greens	2,562	1.31%
Anatoly Madin	Civic Platform	1,524	0.78%
Ivan Grichukov	Civilian Power	1,082	0.55%
Total		195,897	100%

=== 2021 ===
Results by district: Aleksandr Aksyonenko: 30–40% 40–50% 60–70%; Vitaly Novoselov: 20–30% 30–40%

Summary of the 17-19 September 2021 Russian legislative election in the Iskitim constituency
Candidate	Party	Votes	%
Aleksandr Aksyonenko	A Just Russia — For Truth	63,272	29.57%
Vitaly Novoselov	Communist Party	53,042	24.79%
Dmitry Starostenko	United Russia	29,235	13.66%
Andrey Teryayev	New People	16,905	7.90%
Yevgeny Lebedev	Liberal Democratic Party	12,111	5.66%
Natalya Pinus	Rodina	11,372	5.31%
Aleksandr Averkin	Party of Pensioners	11,188	5.23%
Yelena Pivovarova	Yabloko	4,579	2.14%
Aleksandr Plyushkin	Civic Platform	2,072	0.97%
Yevgeny Tsybizov	Party of Growth	1,368	0.64%
Total		213,998	100%

=== 2026 ===
Summary of the 18-20 September 2026 Russian legislative election in the Iskitim constituency
Candidate	Party	Votes	%
Aleksandr Aksyonenko (incumbent)	A Just Russia	109,230	45.79%
Gleb Cherepanov	Communist Party	33,659	14.11%
Dmitry Seleznev	United Russia	27,832	11.67%
Yelena Gladysheva	Liberal Democratic Party	21,104	8.85%
Dmitry Shabanov	Yabloko	17,429	7.31%
Dmitry Babenko	New People	13,617	5.71%
Yulia Kuznetsova	Rodina	5,284	2.22%
Igor Yazykovsky	The Greens	3,130	1.31%
Total		238,549	100%
