= Novosibirsk constituency =

Russian legislative constituency in Novosibirsk Oblast

Novosibirsk single-member constituency
- Constituency of the Russian State Duma

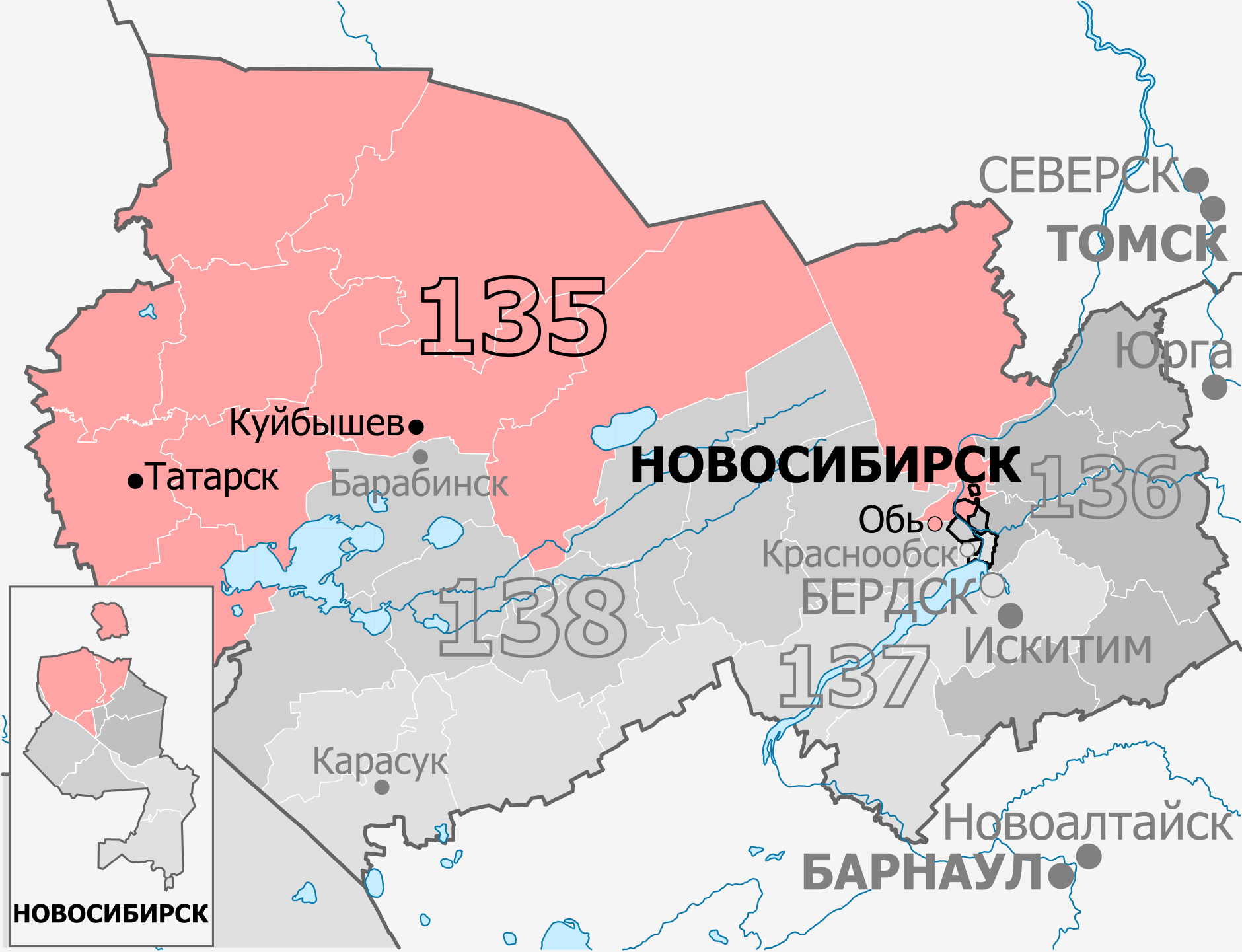
- Constituency boundaries since 2016
- Deputy: Oleg Ivaninsky; United Russia
- Federal subject: Novosibirsk Oblast
- Districts: Chanovsky, Chistoozyorny, Kolyvansky, Kuybyshevsky, Kyshtovsky, Novosibirsk (Kalininsky, Zayeltsovsky, Zheleznodorozhny), Novosibirsky (Krivodanovsky, Kudryashovsky, Mochishchensky, Stantsionny), Ob, Vengerovsky, Severny, Tatarsky, Ubinsky, Ust-Tarksky
- Voters: 538,737 (2026)

The Novosibirsk constituency (No.137 (Note: Zayeltsovsky constituency No.126 in 1993-2007, No.135 in 2016–2026)) is a Russian legislative constituency in Novosibirsk Oblast. The constituency covers northern Novosibirsk and rural northern Novosibirsk Oblast.

The constituency has been represented since 2021 by United Russia deputy Oleg Ivaninsky, regional oncological dispensary chief doctor and former Minister of Health of Novosibirsk Oblast, who won the open seat, succeeding one-term United Russia incumbent Andrey Kalichenko.

== Boundaries ==
1993–2007 Zayeltsovsky constituency: Novosibirsk (Dzerzhinsky, Kalininsky, Tsentralny, Zayeltsovsky, Zheleznodorozhny)
The constituency was placed entirely within Novosibirsk, covering northern half of the city.

2016–present: Chanovsky District, Chistoozyorny District, Kolyvansky District, Kuybyshevsky District, Kyshtovsky District, Novosibirsk (Kalininsky, Zayeltsovsky, Zheleznodorozhny), Novosibirsky District (Krivodanovsky, Kudryashovsky, Mochishchensky, Stantsionny), Ob, Vengerovsky District, Severny District, Tatarsky District, Ubinsky District, Ust-Tarksky District
The constituency was re-created for the 2016 election under the name "Novosibirsk constituency" and retained only its northern half, losing Dzerzhinsky and Tsentralny city districts to new Central constituency. The constituency was spread out to grab more rural territory, gaining satellite city Ob from the dissolved Zavodskoy constituency, sliver of northern Novosibirsky District from Iskitim constituency and vast sparsely populated northern Novosibirsk Oblast from Barabinsk constituency.

== Members elected ==
Election	Member	Party
1993	Vasily Lipitsky	Civic Union
1995	Arkady Yankovsky	Independent
1999	Aleksandr Karelin	Unity
2003	Anatoly Lokot	Communist Party
2007	Proportional representation - no election by constituency	
2011	Proportional representation - no election by constituency	
2016	Andrey Kalichenko	United Russia
2021	Oleg Ivaninsky	United Russia
2026	Oleg Ivaninsky	United Russia

== Election results ==
=== 1993 ===
Summary of the 12 December 1993 Russian legislative election in the Zayeltsovsky constituency
Candidate	Party	Votes	%
Vasily Lipitsky	Civic Union	27,214	12.68%
Arkady Yankovsky	Independent	26,546	12.37%
Lyubov Shvets	Independent	22,818	10.64%
Vladimir Sychev	Choice of Russia	21,642	10.09%
Vitaly Bushuyev	Independent	21,611	10.07%
Aleksandr Lyulko	Independent	16,834	7.85%
Rifat Guseynov	Yavlinsky–Boldyrev–Lukin	11,053	5.15%
Aleksandr Gapeyev	Independent	7,089	3.30%
Aleksandr Kharenko	Russian Democratic Reform Movement	3,414	1.59%
Viktor Kozodoy	Future of Russia–New Names	1,533	0.71%
against all		38,131	17.77%
Total		214,549	100%

=== 1995 ===
Summary of the 17 December 1995 Russian legislative election in the Zayeltsovsky constituency
Candidate	Party	Votes	%
Arkady Yankovsky	Independent	45,920	15.26%
Anatoly Lokot	Communist Party	42,094	13.99%
Vasily Lipitsky (Incumbent)	Social Democrats	34,919	11.60%
Aleksandr Lyulko	Congress of Russian Communities	25,973	8.63%
Sergey Pronichev	Liberal Democratic Party	20,997	6.98%
Konstantin Komarov	Independent	20,670	6.87%
Vladimir Ivankov	Party of Russian Unity and Accord	14,340	4.76%
Ivan Permyakov	Independent	13,597	4.52%
Karim Kamalov	Independent	10,727	3.56%
Viktor Mamatov	Agrarian Party	7,010	2.33%
Igor Lyuzenkov	Tikhonov-Tupolev-Tikhonov	6,183	2.05%
Igor Batenev	Democratic Russia and Free Trade Unions	4,853	1.61%
Oleg Shcherbatenko	Education — Future of Russia	4,308	1.43%
Ilya Konstantinov	Independent	3,646	1.21%
Vladimir Pakhomov	Independent	3,432	1.14%
against all		35,967	11.95%
Total		300,956	100%

=== 1999 ===
Summary of the 19 December 1999 Russian legislative election in the Zayeltsovsky constituency
Candidate	Party	Votes	%
Aleksandr Karelin	Unity	74,922	25.18%
Anatoly Lokot	Communist Party	57,603	19.36%
Georgy Glebov	Yabloko	44,856	15.08%
Andrey Filichev	Fatherland – All Russia	39,731	13.36%
Vladimir Ivankov	Independent	13,171	4.43%
Aleksey Manannikov	Independent	12,247	4.12%
Arkady Yankovsky (incumbent)	Independent	7,618	2.56%
Nadezhda Boltenko	Independent	6,011	2.02%
Yelizaveta Strogaya	Congress of Russian Communities-Yury Boldyrev Movement	3,607	1.21%
Vladimir Italyansky	Communists and Workers of Russia - for the Soviet Union	3,419	1.15%
Pyotr Ilyin	Liberal Democratic Party	2,973	1.00%
Aleksey Medvedev	Spiritual Heritage	2,113	0.71%
Sergey Kozlov	Independent	1,611	0.54%
Anatoly Kubanov	Independent	889	0.30%
Aleksandr Arsenyev	Independent	655	0.22%
Pavel Koluzakov	Independent	610	0.21%
against all		21,301	17.16%
Total		297,499	100%

=== 2003 ===
Summary of the 7 December 2003 Russian legislative election in the Zayeltsovsky constituency
Candidate	Party	Votes	%
Anatoly Lokot	Communist Party	63,171	24.50%
Viktor Ignatov	The Greens	39,469	15.31%
Aleksandr Fomin	Union of Right Forces	28,395	11.01%
Konstantin Karakhalin	Rodina	19,656	7.62%
Olga Lesnevskaya	Social Democratic Party	15,681	6.08%
Pyotr Ilyin	Liberal Democratic Party	14,612	5.67%
Aleksandr Shadt	Independent	5,233	2.03%
Viktor Ostrolutsky	Great Russia – Eurasian Union	3,316	1.29%
against all		61,526	23.86%
Total		258,555	100%

=== 2016 ===
Summary of the 18 September 2016 Russian legislative election in the Novosibirsk constituency
Candidate	Party	Votes	%
Andrey Kalichenko	United Russia	68,579	36.33%
Andrey Zhirnov	Communist Party	51,063	27.05%
Natalia Krasovskaya	Liberal Democratic Party	20,788	11.01%
Dmitry Stakanovsky	A Just Russia	7,551	4.00%
Georgy Mikhaylov	Communists of Russia	7,265	3.85%
Vasily Soroka	Rodina	6,525	3.46%
Sergey Boyko	Yabloko	6,189	3.28%
Olesya Dumchenko	The Greens	3,522	1.87%
Aidar Barantayev	People's Freedom Party	2,744	1.45%
Dmitry Yevtushenko	Civilian Power	2,033	1.08%
Lyubov Ukhalova	Patriots of Russia	1,550	0.82%
Total		188,744	100%

=== 2021 ===
Summary of the 17-19 September 2021 Russian legislative election in the Novosibirsk constituency
Candidate	Party	Votes	%
Oleg Ivaninsky	United Russia	61,928	31.29%
Andrey Zhirnov	Communist Party	49,006	24.76%
Igor Ukraintsev	The Greens	18,455	9.32%
Natalia Krasovskaya	Liberal Democratic Party	13,243	6.69%
Denis Rodin	A Just Russia — For Truth	10,627	5.37%
Natalya Pinigina	New People	9,952	5.03%
Nikita Fedchenko	Party of Pensioners	7,049	3.56%
Konstantin Antonov	Rodina	5,484	2.77%
Natalya Chubykina	Yabloko	3,432	1.73%
Dmitry Kryukov	Russian Party of Freedom and Justice	3,307	1.67%
Pavel Yerokhin	Party of Growth	3,055	1.54%
Rafael Adam	Civic Platform	2,935	1.48%
Total		197,921	100%

=== 2026 ===
Summary of the 18-20 September 2026 Russian legislative election in the Novosibirsk constituency
Candidate	Party	Votes	%
Oleg Ivaninsky (incumbent)	United Russia	83,426	36.48%
Andrey Zhirnov	Communist Party	50,090	21.90%
Sergey Levshenkov	New People	21,989	9.61%
Aleksey Radkevich	Liberal Democratic Party	17,375	7.60%
Natalya Chubykina	Yabloko	14,411	6.30%
Dmitry Sakharov	A Just Russia	12,407	5.42%
Sergey Kondratyev	Party of Pensioners	11,360	4.97%
Sergey Bolshakov	Rodina	10,548	4.61%
Total		228,717	100%
