= Central constituency (Novosibirsk Oblast) =

Central single-member constituency
- Constituency of the Russian State Duma

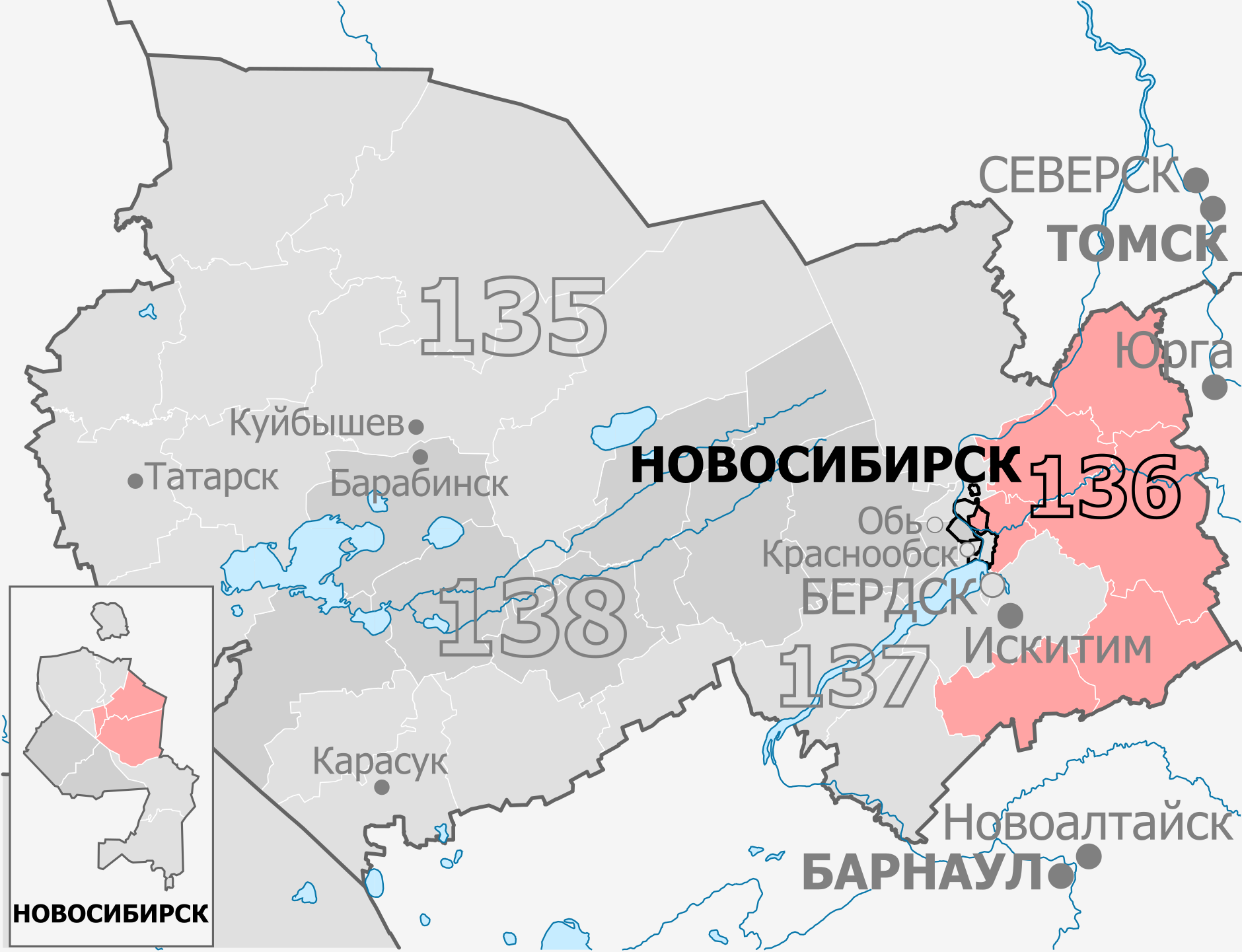
- Constituency boundaries since 2016
- Deputy: Dmitry Savelyev; United Russia
- Federal subject: Novosibirsk Oblast
- Districts: Cherepanovsky, Koltsovo, Maslyaninsky, Moshkovsky, Novosibirsk (Dzerzhinsky, Oktyabrsky, Tsentralny), Novosibirsky (Baryshevsky, Berezovsky, Kamensky, Novolugovskoy, Plotnikovsky, Razdolnensky), Toguchinsky
- Voters: 573,173 (2026)

The Central constituency (No.138 (Note: No.136 in 2016–2026)) is a Russian legislative constituency in Novosibirsk Oblast. The constituency covers eastern Novosibirsk and eastern Novosibirsk Oblast.

The constituency has been represented since 2021 by United Russia deputy Dmitry Savelyev, four-term State Duma member and 2016 LDPR candidate for this seat, who won the open seat, succeeding one-term United Russia incumbent Maksim Kudryavtsev.

== Boundaries ==
2016–present: Cherepanovsky District, Koltsovo, Maslyaninsky District, Moshkovsky District, Novosibirsk (Dzerzhinsky, Oktyabrsky, Tsentralny), Novosibirsky District (Baryshevsky, Berezovsky, Kamensky, Novolugovskoy, Plotnikovsky, Razdolnensky), Toguchinsky District
The constituency was created for the 2016 election, taking Dzerzhinsky and Tsentralny city districts of Novosibirsk from Zayeltsovsky constituency, Oktyabrsky City District from the dissolved Zavodskoy constituency as well as suburbs, exurbs and ruralities in eastern Novosibirsk Oblast from Iskitim constituency.

== Members elected ==
Election	Member	Party
2016	Maksim Kudryavtsev	United Russia
2021	Dmitry Savelyev	United Russia
2026	Dmitry Savelyev	United Russia

== Election results ==
=== 2016 ===
Summary of the 18 September 2016 Russian legislative election in the Central constituency
Candidate	Party	Votes	%
Maksim Kudryavtsev	United Russia	66,134	36.15%
Dmitry Savelyev	Liberal Democratic Party	38,773	21.19%
Renat Suleymanov	Communist Party	32,864	17.96%
Sergey Loskutov	Communists of Russia	10,745	5.87%
Pavel Pyatnitsky	Rodina	7,096	3.88%
Olga Vakulenko	The Greens	6,712	3.67%
Gennady Shishebarov	Yabloko	5,158	2.82%
Sergey Dyachkov	People's Freedom Party	3,712	2.03%
Vadim Skurikhin	Patriots of Russia	1,958	1.07%
Total		182,947	100%

=== 2021 ===
Summary of the 17-19 September 2021 Russian legislative election in the Central constituency
Candidate	Party	Votes	%
Dmitry Savelyev	United Russia	79,590	40.71%
Renat Suleymanov	Communist Party	38,754	19.82%
Aleksandr Lipatkin	Communists of Russia	15,158	7.75%
Vyacheslav Usoltsev	New People	15,005	7.67%
Aleksandr Prokhorov	A Just Russia — For Truth	12,016	6.15%
Aleksandr Shcherbak	Liberal Democratic Party	11,554	5.91%
Natalya Chubartseva	Party of Pensioners	7,264	3.72%
Tatyana Kharkovskaya	Russian Party of Freedom and Justice	3,327	1.70%
Oleg Shestakov	Party of Growth	2,753	1.41%
Dmitry Shabanov	Yabloko	2,555	1.31%
Total		195,512	100%

=== 2026 ===
Summary of the 18-20 September 2026 Russian legislative election in the Central constituency
Candidate	Party	Votes	%
Dmitry Savelyev (incumbent)	United Russia	114,408	46.26%
Renat Suleymanov	Communist Party	30,810	12.46%
Oksana Brashnina	New People	25,945	10.49%
Pyotr Kopylov	Yabloko	22,534	9.11%
Aleksandr Prokhorov	A Just Russia	14,635	5.92%
Aleksandr Lipatkin	Communists of Russia	12,853	5.20%
Olga Belova	Party of Direct Democracy	7,087	2.87%
Natalya Chubartseva	The Greens	6,261	2.53%
Kristina Likhachyova	Rodina	5,377	2.17%
Total		247,309	100%
