= Alexey Kanayev =

Russian politician

- Алексей Канаев
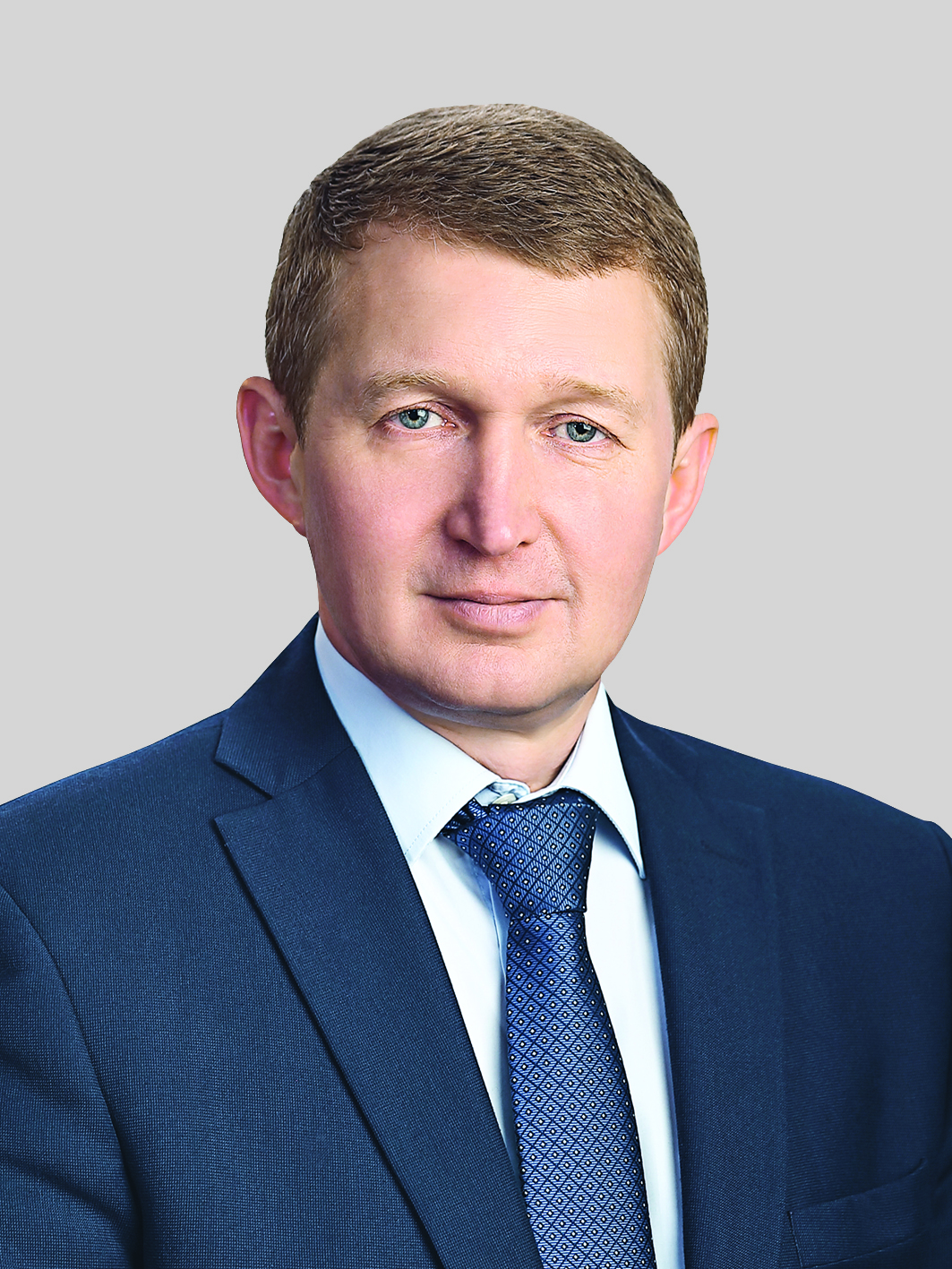

Member of the State Duma for Vologda Oblast
- Incumbent
- Assumed office 5 October 2016
- Preceded by: constituency re-established
- Constituency: Cherepovets (No. 86)

Personal details
- Born: 30 September 1971 (age 55) Strunino, Vladimir Oblast, Russian SFSR, USSR
- Party: United Russia (–2025)
- Education: Higher School of Economics; RANEPA
- Website: alexeykanaev.ru

Alexey Valerianovich Kanayev (Russian: Алексей Валерианович Канаев; born September 30, 1971, Strunino, Vladimir Oblast) is a Russian political figure and deputy of the 8th State Duma.

In 1992, he started working as an editor for the local television in Cherepovets. In 1997, he was appointed the general director of the local TV station "Channel-12". Simultaneously with that, in 2000, he also headed the city channel "TV-7" and local FM radio station "Transmit". From 2002 to 2016, he was a deputy of the Legislative Assembly of Vologda Oblast. In 2016, he was elected deputy of the 7th State Duma from the Cherepovets constituency. After the end of his first period in the State Duma, Kanayev was heavily criticized in local newspaper for the lack of activity on his part. In September 2021, he was re-elected for the 8th State Duma.

In February 2025, Kanayev was expelled from the United Russia party by decision of its Vologda Oblast branch. As Kanayev himself claimed, the reason was his opposition to governor Georgy Filimonov's prohibition initiatives.
