= Valery Bakalov =

Russian scientist (1940–2021)

- Валерий Пантелеевич Бакалов
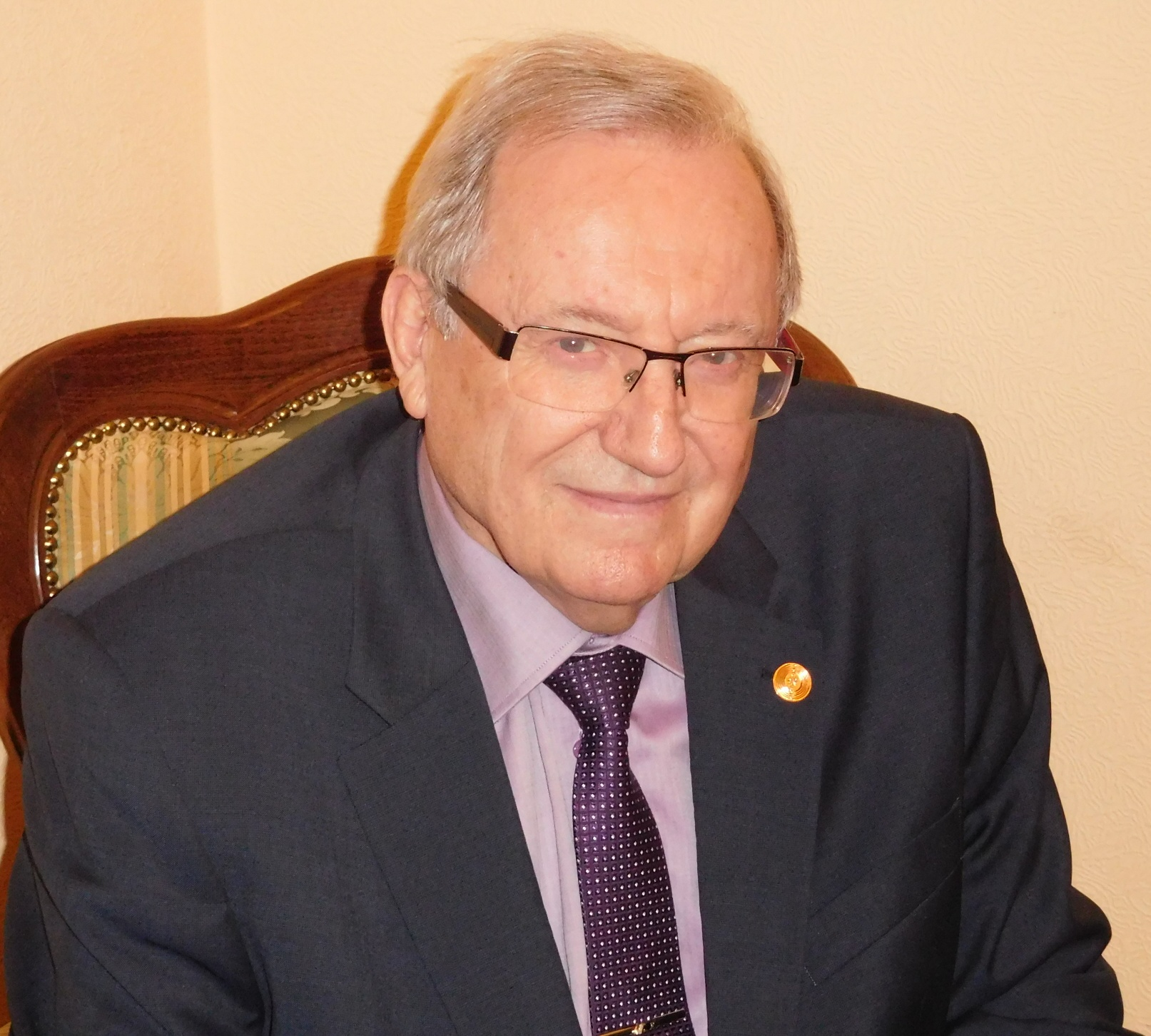
- Born: 19 September 1940; Novosibirsk, Soviet Union
- Died: 21 June 2021 (aged 80)
- Education: Leningrad Electrotechnical Institute named after V. I. Ulyanov
- Scientific career
- Fields: Telecommunications
- Workplaces: Siberian Branch of the Academy of Sciences of the USSR; Siberian State University of Telecommunications and Informatics

Valery Panteleyevich Bakalov (Russian: Валерий Пантелеевич Бакалов; 1940—2021) was a Soviet and Russian scientist, Doctor of Engineering Sciences, professor, specialist in communications, information and measuring technology, theory of electrical circuits, the rector of Siberian State University of Telecommunications and Informatics (1987–2005).

== Biography ==
He was born on 19 September 1940, in Novosibirsk. In 1963 Bakalov graduated from the Radio Engineering Faculty at Leningrad Electrotechnical Institute named after V. I. Ulyanov.

For seven years the scientist worked in one of the special designing and technological bureau (Leningrad), as well as at SB AS USSR (Novosibirsk), where he worked on problems related to radio telemetry.

In 1971, he began worked at the Novosibirsk Electrotechnical Institute of Communication (future Siberian State University of Telecommunications and Informatics). From 1987 to 2005, Bakalov was the rector of this educational institution.

He died on 21 June 2021, and was buried at the Zayeltsovskoye Cemetery in Novosibirsk.

== Activities ==
The researcher contributed to the development of the general theory and methods for optimizing information and measurement systems with a spatially distributed structure. He oversaw programs for the creation of radio telemtric complexes, which were subsequently introduced into various sectors of national economy, and he was also involved in the informatization of Siberia and Far East.

Bakalov was one of the founders of such a scientific direction as biotelemetry.

He authored more than 200 scientific works and inventions, including 6 monographs and 10 textbooks for higher education institutions, as well as more than a dozen textbooks on the theory of electrical circuits and radiotelemetry.
