= Zavodskoy constituency =

Russian legislative constituency

Zavodskoy single-member constituency
- Constituency of the Russian State Duma
- Deputy: None
- Federal subject: Novosibirsk Oblast
- Districts: Novosibirsk (Kirovsky, Leninsky, Oktyabrsky, Pervomaysky), Ob
- Voters: 561,651 (2003)

The Zavodskoy constituency (No.125) was a Russian legislative constituency in Novosibirsk Oblast in 1993–2007. It covered southern Novosibirsk and, alongside Zayeltsovsky constituency, was one of the constituencies, that covered urban Novosibirsk. The seat was last occupied by A Just Russia-Rodina faction member Svyatoslav Nastashevsky, a journalist and TV host, who defeated first-term incumbent State Duma member Galina Strelchenko in the 2003 election.

The constituency was dissolved in 2007 when State Duma adopted full proportional representation for the next two electoral cycles. Zavodskoy constituency was not re-established for the 2016 election, currently its territory was split between all four Novosibirsk Oblast constituencies: Novosibirsk, Central, Iskitim and Barabinsk constituencies.

== Boundaries ==
1993–2007: Novosibirsk (Kirovsky, Leninsky, Oktyabrsky, Pervomaysky), Ob
The constituency covered southern half of Novosibirsk and the satellite city of Ob.

== Members elected ==
| Election | Member | Party |
|---|---|---|
| 1993 | Ivan Anichkin | Dignity and Charity |
| 1995 | Ivan Anichkin | Independent |
| 1999 | Galina Strelchenko | Unity |
| 2003 | Svyatoslav Nastashevsky | Independent |

== Election results ==
=== 1993 ===
==== Declared candidates ====
- Ivan Anichkin (DiM), former People's Deputy of Russia (1990–1993), radioelectronics plant director
- Yury Bernadsky (Civic Union), former Chairman of the Novosibirsk City Council of People's Deputies (1992–1993)
- Igor Kozlov (BR–NI), political operative
- Nikolay Krasnikov (Choice of Russia), Mayor of Koltsovo (1991–present)
- Galina Kuchina (Kedr), ecological activist, nonprofit chairwoman
- Olga Lesnevskaya (Independent), former Member of Novosibirsk Oblast Council of People's Deputies (1990–1993) (previously ran as DPR candidate)
- Aleksandr Plotnikov (RDDR), scientific supervisor of the Novosibirsk City Fund of Social Support
- Vladimir Shirokov (DPR), chairman of the party regional office
- Anatoly Tsikhotsky (PRES), Siberian Career Centre department of the theory of state and law head

==== Results ====
Summary of the 12 December 1993 Russian legislative election in the Zavodskoy constituency
| Candidate | Party | Votes | % |
|---|---|---|---|
| Ivan Anichkin | Dignity and Charity | 33,396 | 15.00% |
| Olga Lesnevskaya | Independent | 29,692 | 13.34% |
| Vladimir Shirokov | Democratic Party | 25,074 | 11.26% |
| Nikolay Krasnikov | Choice of Russia | 24,001 | 10.78% |
| Aleksandr Plotnikov | Russian Democratic Reform Movement | 14,973 | 6.73% |
| Yury Bernadsky | Civic Union | 12,829 | 5.76% |
| Galina Kuchina | Kedr | 8,894 | 4.00% |
| Anatoly Tsikhotsky | Party of Russian Unity and Accord | 6,422 | 2.88% |
| Igor Kozlov | Future of Russia–New Names | 2,971 | 1.33% |
| against all | | 38,140 | 17.13% |
| Total | | 222,613 | 100% |

=== 1995 ===
==== Declared candidates ====
- Leonid Agafonov (Interethnic Union), mechanical plant director
- Frol Ananyin (K–TR–zSS), electrician
- Ivan Anichkin (Independent), incumbent Member of State Duma (1994–present)
- Gennady Bessonov (PGL), Member of Novosibirsk Oblast Council of Deputies (1994–present)
- Pavel Isayev (Independent), Member of Novosibirsk Oblast Council of Deputies (1994–present) (also running for governor)
- Aleksandr Kiselnikov (Independent), economist
- Stanislav Labetsky (Independent), corporate executive
- Nikolay Mikheyev (Independent), chairman of the regional association of investors
- Aleksandr Prosenko (LDPR), Novosibirsk State Pedagogical University department of chemistry head
- Gennady Pugachyov (NDR), prorector of the Novosibirsk State Academy of Construction
- Anatoly Stolbov (Derzhava), metallurgical plant director
- Aleksandr Zhuravkov (Independent), traumatologist

==== Results ====
Summary of the 17 December 1995 Russian legislative election in the Zavodskoy constituency
| Candidate | Party | Votes | % |
|---|---|---|---|
| Ivan Anichkin (incumbent) | Independent | 45,327 | 13.80% |
| Aleksandr Prosenko | Liberal Democratic Party | 33,009 | 10.05% |
| Frol Ananyin | Communists and Working Russia - for the Soviet Union | 30,217 | 9.20% |
| Stanislav Labetsky | Independent | 29,591 | 9.01% |
| Gennady Pugachyov | Our Home – Russia | 28,587 | 8.70% |
| Gennady Bessonov | Pamfilova–Gurov–Lysenko | 21,955 | 6.68% |
| Pavel Isayev | Independent | 16,596 | 5.05% |
| Aleksandr Kiselnikov | Independent | 15,461 | 4.71% |
| Leonid Agafonov | Interethnic Union | 13,533 | 4.12% |
| Anatoly Stolbov | Derzhava | 12,675 | 3.86% |
| Aleksandr Zhuravkov | Independent | 10,699 | 3.26% |
| Nikolay Mikheyev | Independent | 4,564 | 1.39% |
| against all | | 55,509 | 16.90% |
| Total | | 328,450 | 100% |

=== 1999 ===
==== Declared candidates ====
- Ivan Anichkin (Independent), incumbent Member of State Duma (1994–present)
- Nadezhda Azarova (OVR), First Deputy Governor of Novosibirsk Oblast (1998–present)
- Olga Frolova (Independent), former chief of staff to Minister of Russia Nikolay Khvatkov (1998)
- Yevgeny Gavrilov (Independent), student
- Aleksey Glazkov (Independent), Member of Novosibirsk Oblast Council of Deputies (1998–present)
- Boris Konovalov (Yabloko), Member of Novosibirsk City Council (1994–present), former People's Deputy of Russia (1990–1993)
- Sergey Kretov (Independent), chief counsel to the West Siberian Railway
- Yevgeny Kulmanov (Independent), businessman
- Aleksandr Lyulko (Independent), Member of Novosibirsk City Council (1996–present)
- Sergey Nacharov (Independent), construction businessman
- Svetlana Smolentseva (CPRF), song and dance ensemble art director
- Galina Strelchenko (Unity), Siberia Airlines executive
- Georgy Tolmachev (Independent), nonprofit president

==== Failed to qualify ====
- Vladimir Borovko (Independent), children's cultural centre director

==== Did not file ====
- Sergey Filatov (Independent), chemical businessman
- Anatoly Gavrilov (Independent), Siberian Academy of Finance and Banking senior lecturer
- Izabella Klychkova (Independent)
- Stanislav Labetsky (Independent), corporate executive, 1995 candidate for this seat
- Aleksandr Lantsevich (Independent)
- Viktor Malov (DN), businessman
- Aleksey Mazur (Independent), former Member of Novosibirsk Oblast Council of People's Deputies (1990–1993)
- Sergey Meshkov (KTR–zSS)
- Maksim Nikiforov (Independent)
- Aleksey Osipov (RSP), historian
- Sergey Shramko (SPS), journalist
- Igor Voloshin (Independent), nonprofit president

==== Results ====
Summary of the 19 December 1999 Russian legislative election in the Zavodskoy constituency
| Candidate | Party | Votes | % |
|---|---|---|---|
| Galina Strelchenko | Unity | 51,562 | 15.71% |
| Aleksey Glazkov | Independent | 51,490 | 15.69% |
| Ivan Anichkin (incumbent) | Independent | 48,442 | 14.76% |
| Nadezhda Azarova | Fatherland – All Russia | 26,317 | 8.02% |
| Svetlana Smolentseva | Communist Party | 25,534 | 7.78% |
| Sergey Kretov | Independent | 24,517 | 7.47% |
| Boris Konovalov | Yabloko | 23,370 | 7.12% |
| Aleksandr Lyulko | Independent | 19,024 | 5.80% |
| Yevgeny Gavrilov | Independent | 5,139 | 1.57% |
| Sergey Nacharov | Independent | 4,657 | 1.42% |
| Georgy Tolmachev | Independent | 4,202 | 1.28% |
| Olga Frolova | Independent | 1,155 | 0.35% |
| Yevgeny Kulmanov | Independent | 767 | 0.23% |
| against all | | 36,105 | 11.00% |
| Total | | 328,201 | 100% |

=== 2003 ===
==== Declared candidates ====
- Ivan Anichkin (Independent), former Member of State Duma (1994–1999)
- Gennady Bessonov (Independent), Member of Novosibirsk Oblast Council of Deputies (1994–present), 1995 candidate for this seat
- Stanislav Dasmanov (RPT), air traffic controller, union leader
- Vladimir Davidenko (Independent), former Member of State Duma (1996–1999)
- Igor Gavrilenko (Yabloko), Tu-154 captain at Sibir Airlines
- Sergey Klestov (CPRF), former Member of Novosibirsk Oblast Council of Deputies (1998–2002)
- Eduard Kozhemyakin (United Russia), Member of Novosibirsk City Council (2001–present), real estate developer
- Yury Kuvshinov (SPS), former Member of Novosibirsk City Council of People's Deputies (1990–1993), businessman
- Aleksandr Lyulko (Rodina), Member of Novosibirsk City Council (1996–present), 1999 candidate for this seat
- Nikolay Marzan (VR–ES), construction businessman
- Svyatoslav Nastashevsky (Independent), journalist, actor
- Irina Radzivilo (PVR-RPZh), insurance executive
- Aleksandr Stepanenko (Independent), entrepreneur
- Galina Strelchenko (Independent), incumbent Member of State Duma (2000–present), Chairwoman of the Duma Commission on Ethics (2000–present)
- Vladislav Tiunov (LDPR), entrepreneur

==== Withdrawn candidates ====
- Konstantin Petrov (KPE), chairman of the Conceptual Party "Unity" (2000–present), conspiracy theorist, retired Strategic Rocket Forces major general

==== Failed to qualify ====
- Vladimir Berezin (ZRS), Orthodox Christian activist

==== Did not file ====
- Igor Kozlov (Independent), political operative, 1993 candidate for this seat
- Yury Marchenko (RPP-PSS), Siberian State Geodesic Academy professor
- Lyubov Pupchik (PME), construction businesswoman
- Andrey Tokarev (Independent), afterschool teacher

==== Results ====
Summary of the 7 December 2003 Russian legislative election in the Zavodskoy constituency
| Candidate | Party | Votes | % |
|---|---|---|---|
| Svyatoslav Nastashevsky | Independent | 70,898 | 24.28% |
| Eduard Kozhemyakin | United Russia | 36,323 | 12.44% |
| Aleksandr Lyulko | Rodina | 34,643 | 11.86% |
| Sergey Klestov | Communist Party | 34,487 | 11.81% |
| Galina Strelchenko (incumbent) | Independent | 20,393 | 6.98% |
| Ivan Anichkin | Independent | 14,436 | 4.94% |
| Igor Gavrilenko | Yabloko | 8,716 | 2.98% |
| Vladislav Tiunov | Liberal Democratic Party | 7,853 | 2.69% |
| Gennady Bessonov | Independent | 5,625 | 1.93% |
| Yury Kuvshinov | Union of Right Forces | 5,570 | 1.91% |
| Irina Radzivilo | Party of Russia's Rebirth-Russian Party of Life | 1,790 | 0.61% |
| Stanislav Dasmanov | Russian Party of Labour | 1,457 | 0.50% |
| Aleksandr Stepanenko | Independent | 1,403 | 0.48% |
| Nikolay Marzan | Great Russia – Eurasian Union | 1,384 | 0.47% |
| Vladimir Davidenko | Independent | 438 | 0.15% |
| against all | | 40,451 | 13.85% |
| Total | | 292,702 | 100% |
