= Oleg Ivaninsky =

Russian politician (born 1966)

- Олег Иванинский
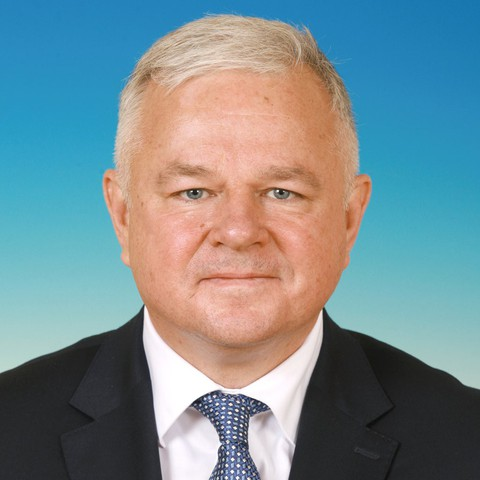
- official portrait, circa 2021

Member of the State Duma for Novosibirsk Oblast
- Incumbent
- Assumed office 12 October 2021
- Preceded by: Andrey Kalichenko
- Constituency: Novosibirsk (No. 135)

Minister of Health of the Novosibirsk Oblast
- In office 2014–2018

Personal details
- Born: 5 June 1966 (age 60) Novosibirsk, Novosibirsk Oblast, Russian SFSR, USSR
- Party: United Russia
- Education: Novosibirsk State Medical Academy

Oleg Ivanovich Ivaninsky (Russian: Олег Иванович Иванинский; born 5 June 1966, Novosibirsk, Novosibirsk Oblast) is a Russian political figure and a deputy of the 8th State Duma.

== Career ==
In 1995, he was awarded a Doctor of Sciences degree in Medical Sciences. At the beginning of the 1990s, Ivaninsky worked as a urologist at the Novosibirsk Regional Clinical Hospital.

From 1996 to 1998, he headed the health department of the administration of the Central District of Novosibirsk.

From 2001 to 2021, he served as a deputy of the Legislative Assembly of Novosibirsk Oblast of the 3rd, 4th, 5th, and later the 7th convocations.

Between 2001 and 2011, Ivaninsky worked as the chief physician of the municipal health care service Emergency Medical Aid Station in Novosibirsk.

In 2011, he was appointed head of the Novosibirsk Regional Clinical Oncological Dispensary.

In 2014, Ivaninsky was appointed Minister of Health of the Novosibirsk Oblast.

Since September 2021, he has served as a deputy of the 8th State Duma.

== Personal life ==
Oleg Ivaninsky is married and has three children.

== Sanctions ==
He was sanctioned by Canada under the Special Economic Measures Act (S.C. 1992, c. 17) in relation to the Russian invasion of Ukraine for Grave Breach of International Peace and Security, and by the UK government in 2022 in relation to Russo-Ukrainian War.
