= Barabinsk constituency =

Legislative constituency in Russia

Barabinsk single-member constituency
- Constituency of the Russian State Duma

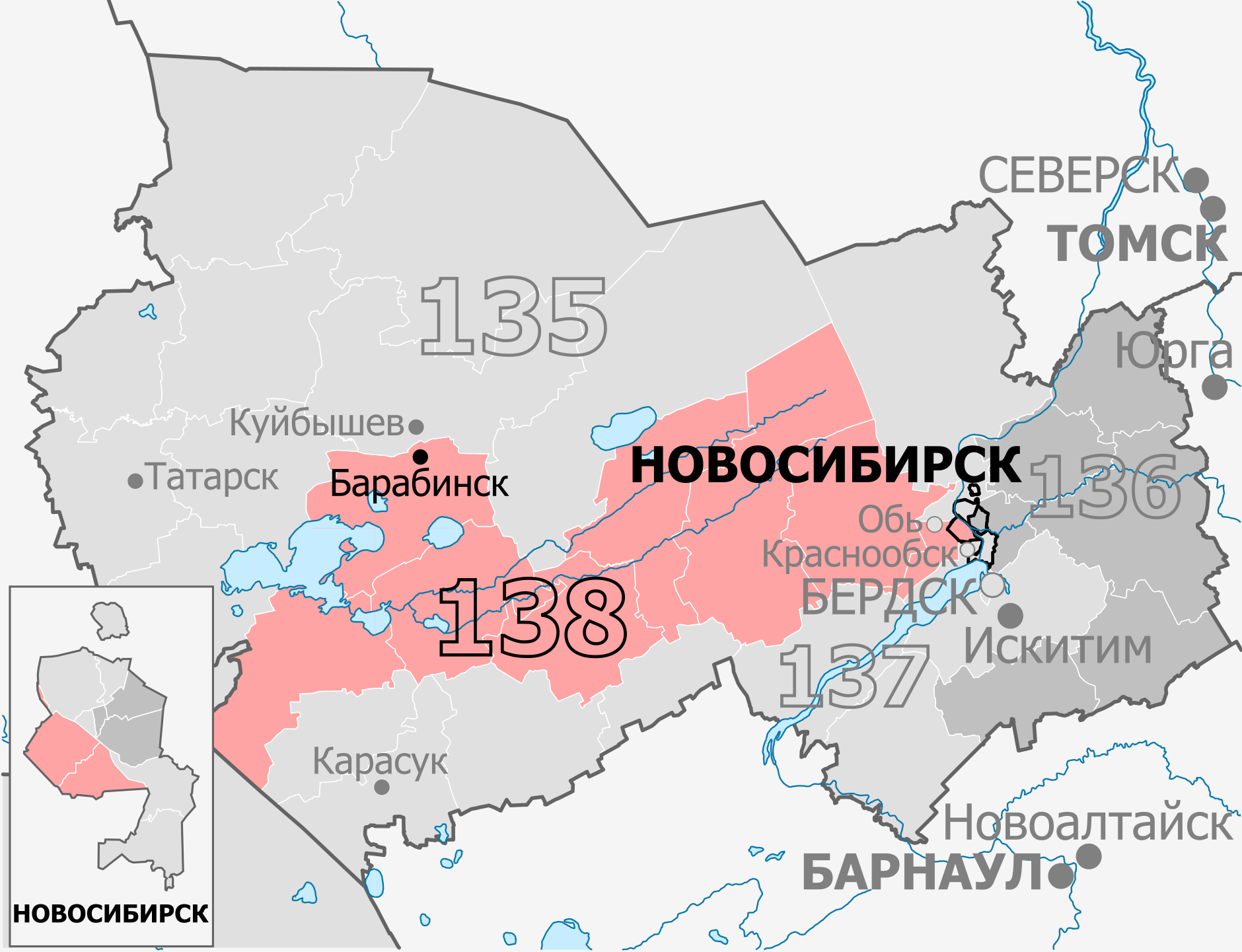
- Constituency boundaries since 2016
- Deputy: Viktor Ignatov; United Russia
- Federal subject: Novosibirsk Oblast
- Districts: Barabinsky, Chulymsky, Dovolensky, Kargatsky, Kochenyovsky, Kupinsky, Novosibirsk (Kirovsky, Leninsky), Novosibirsky (Tolmachevsky, Verkh-Tulinsky, Yarkovsky), Zdvinsky
- Voters: 566,488 (2026)

The Barabinsk constituency (No.140 (Note: No.124 in 1993-2007, No.138 in 2016–2026)) is a Russian legislative constituency in Novosibirsk Oblast. The constituency covers western Novosibirsk and rural central Novosibirsk Oblast.

The constituency has been represented since 2016 by United Russia deputy Viktor Ignatov, former First Deputy Mayor of Novosibirsk and Senator.

== Boundaries ==
1993–2007: Bagansky District, Barabinsk, Barabinsky District, Chanovsky District, Chistoozerny District, Chulymsky District, Dovolensky District, Karasuksky District, Kargatsky District, Kochenyovsky District, Kochkovsky District, Kolyvansky District, Krasnozersky District, Kuybyshev, Kupinsky District, Kuybyshevsky District, Kyshtovsky District, Ordynsky District, Severny District, Tatarsk, Tatarsky District, Ubinsky District, Ust-Tarksky District, Vengerovsky District, Zdvinsky District
The constituency covered rural central and western Novosibirsk Oblast, which comprised the majority of the oblast territory.

2016–present: Barabinsky District, Chulymsky District, Dovolensky District, Kargatsky District, Kochenyovsky District, Kupinsky District, Novosibirsk (Kirovsky, Leninsky), Novosibirsky District (Tolmachevsky, Verkh-Tulinsky, Yarkovsky), Zdvinsky District
The constituency was re-created for the 2016 election and retained only a strip across central Novosibirsk Oblast from Kochenyovsky District to Kupinsky District as well as Barabinsk, losing its northern part to Novosibirsk constituency, and southern – to Iskitim constituency. The constituency was pushed to the east to grab parts of Novosibirsky District from Iskitim constituency and western Novosibirsk from the dissolved Zavodskoy constituency.

== Members elected ==
Election	Member	Party
1993	Nikolay Kharitonov	Agrarian Party
1995	Nikolay Kharitonov	Agrarian Party
1999	Nikolay Kharitonov	Communist Party
2003	Nikolay Kharitonov	Communist Party
2007	Proportional representation - no election by constituency	
2011	Proportional representation - no election by constituency	
2016	Viktor Ignatov	United Russia
2021	Viktor Ignatov	United Russia
2026	Viktor Ignatov	United Russia

== Election results ==
=== 1993 ===
Summary of the 12 December 1993 Russian legislative election in the Barabinsk constituency
Candidate	Party	Votes	%
Nikolay Kharitonov	Agrarian Party	169,073	54.21%
Igor Malkov	Yavlinsky–Boldyrev–Lukin	51,160	16.40%
Vladimir Bokov	Communist Party	26,117	8.37%
against all		49,344	15.82%
Total		311,857	100%

=== 1995 ===
Summary of the 17 December 1995 Russian legislative election in the Barabinsk constituency
Candidate	Party	Votes	%
Nikolay Kharitonov (incumbent)	Agrarian Party	126,880	35.05%
Aleksandr Donchenko	Communist Party	74,549	20.59%
Andrey Dorovsky	Liberal Democratic Party	57,148	15.79%
Vitaly Trunov	Bloc of Independents	30,870	8.53%
Viktor Nozdryukhin	Our Home – Russia	23,615	6.52%
against all		39,375	10.88%
Total		362,003	100%

=== 1999 ===
Summary of the 19 December 1999 Russian legislative election in the Barabinsk constituency
Candidate	Party	Votes	%
Nikolay Kharitonov (incumbent)	Communist Party	183,078	53.34%
Yevgeny Loginov	Liberal Democratic Party	47,829	13.93%
Aleksandr Melnik	Independent	37,917	11.05%
Aleksandr Panin	Yabloko	22,744	6.63%
Mikhail Fedotov	Spiritual Heritage	8,056	2.35%
Yevgeny Sokolkov	Andrey Nikolayev and Svyatoslav Fyodorov Bloc	5,718	1.67%
against all		28,479	8.30%
Total		343,251	100%

=== 2003 ===
Summary of the 7 December 2003 Russian legislative election in the Barabinsk constituency
Candidate	Party	Votes	%
Nikolay Kharitonov (incumbent)	Communist Party	174,715	56.40%
Yevgeny Loginov	Liberal Democratic Party	36,615	11.82%
Natalya Melnichenko	Agrarian Party	17,516	5.65%
Anatoly Gvozdev	Union of Right Forces	15,274	4.93%
Boris Mironov	Independent	8,889	2.87%
Yury Kargapolov	Independent	7,797	2.52%
against all		38,688	12.49%
Total		309,951	100%

=== 2016 ===
Summary of the 18 September 2016 Russian legislative election in the Barabinsk constituency
Candidate	Party	Votes	%
Viktor Ignatov	United Russia	66,919	39.19%
Roman Yakovlev	Communist Party	28,511	16.70%
Dmitry Golovanev	Liberal Democratic Party	26,976	15.80%
Aleksandr Vandakurov	A Just Russia	12,559	7.36%
Olga Shmendel	Communists of Russia	10,425	6.11%
Dmitry Lukashev	Rodina	6,325	3.70%
Dmitry Kholyavchenko	Yabloko	3,498	2.05%
Bulat Barantayev	People's Freedom Party	3,324	1.95%
Dmitry Popov	Patriots of Russia	2,660	1.56%
Total		170,751	100%

=== 2021 ===
Summary of the 17-19 September 2021 Russian legislative election in the Barabinsk constituency
Candidate	Party	Votes	%
Viktor Ignatov (incumbent)	United Russia	65,385	35.88%
Roman Yakovlev	Communist Party	51,586	28.31%
Timur Gostyayev	New People	15,003	8.23%
Eduard Kozhemyakin	Party of Pensioners	12,906	7.08%
Roman Kazakov	Liberal Democratic Party	12,424	6.82%
Andrey Filimoshkin	A Just Russia — For Truth	9,971	5.47%
Tatyana Samkova	Party of Growth	5,227	2.87%
Maksim Teppo	Civic Platform	1,173	0.64%
Total		182,231	100%

=== 2026 ===
Summary of the 18-20 September 2026 Russian legislative election in the Barabinsk constituency
Candidate	Party	Votes	%
Viktor Ignatov (incumbent)	United Russia	89,688	41.46%
Roman Yakovlev	Communist Party	44,610	20.62%
Mikhail Mikhaylov	Liberal Democratic Party	19,587	9.05%
Yelena Pivovarova	Yabloko	18,464	8.53%
Sergey Ustinov	New People	16,928	7.82%
Vasily Titovsky	A Just Russia	9,968	4.61%
Mikhail Melkobrodov	Party of Pensioners	7,746	3.58%
Gennady Shmakov	Rodina	3,156	1.46%
Total		216,336	100%
