= Cherepovets constituency =

Russian legislative constituency in Vologda Oblast

Cherepovets single-member constituency
- Constituency of the Russian State Duma

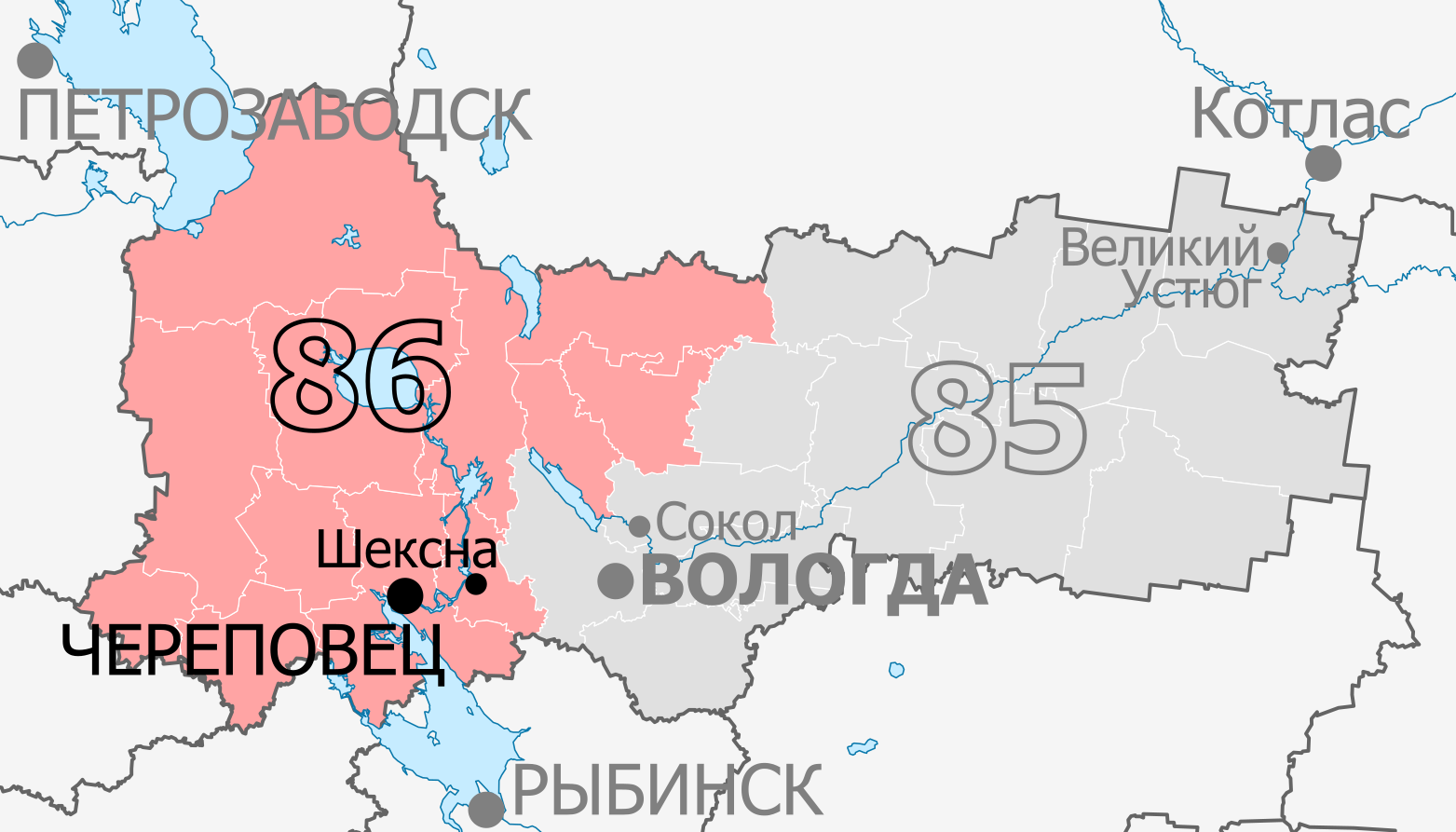
- Constituency boundaries since 2016
- Deputy: Svetlana Grachyova; United Russia
- Federal subject: Vologda Oblast
- Districts: Babayevsky, Belozersky, Chagodoshchensky, Cherepovets, Cherepovetsky, Kaduysky, Kharovsky, Kirillovsky, Sheksninsky, Ust-Kubinsky, Ustyuzhensky, Vashkinsky, Vozhegodsky, Vytegorsky
- Voters: 414,077 (2026)

The Cherepovets constituency (No.89 (Note: No.74 in 1993-1995, No.73 in 1995-2003, No.75 in 2003-2007, No.86 in 2016–2026)) is a Russian legislative constituency in Vologda Oblast. The constituency covers western Vologda Oblast and the industrial city Cherepovets.

The constituency has been represented since 2026 by United Russia deputy Svetlana Grachyova, former Head of Kaduysky District and businesswoman, who narrowly won the open seat after two-term United Russia incumbent Aleksey Kanayev was expelled from the party and retired.

== Boundaries ==
1993–2007, 2016–present: Babayevsky District, Belozersky District, Chagodoshchensky District, Cherepovets, Cherepovetsky District, Kaduysky District, Kharovsky District, Kirillovsky District, Sheksninsky District, Ust-Kubinsky District, Ustyuzhensky District, Vashkinsky District, Vozhegodsky District, Vytegorsky District
The constituency has been covering western Vologda Oblast, including a major industrial city Cherepovets, since its initial creation in 1993.

== Members elected ==
Election	Member	Party
1993	Vasily Kovalyov	Independent
1995	Aleksandr Ponomaryov	Communist Party
1999	Aleksandr Orgolainen	Independent
2003	Aleksandr Orgolainen	United Russia
2007	Proportional representation - no election by constituency	
2011	Proportional representation - no election by constituency	
2016	Aleksey Kanayev	United Russia
2021	Aleksey Kanayev	United Russia
2026	Svetlana Grachyova	United Russia

== Election results ==
=== 1993 ===
Summary of the 12 December 1993 Russian legislative election in the Cherepovets constituency
Candidate	Party	Votes	%
Vasily Kovalyov	Independent	109,503	40.74%
Viktor Anufriyev	Independent	56,300	20.94%
Sergey Tulin	Liberal Democratic Party	39,969	14.87%
Yevgeny Mokhov	Russian Democratic Reform Movement	19,011	7.07%
against all		29,277	10.89%
Total		268,802	100%

=== 1995 ===
Summary of the 17 December 1995 Russian legislative election in the Cherepovets constituency
Candidate	Party	Votes	%
Aleksandr Ponomaryov	Communist Party	60,046	20.79%
Viktor Anufriyev	Independent	56,595	19.60%
Vasily Kovalyov (incumbent)	Forward, Russia!	50,581	17.51%
Vladimir Izotin	Our Home – Russia	26,954	9.33%
Igor Zhuravlev	Independent	20,732	7.18%
Vladimir Rogozhnikov	Liberal Democratic Party	19,965	6.91%
Valentina Yasenchuk	Christian-Democratic Union - Christians of Russia	7,950	2.75%
Mikhail Roshchin	Ivan Rybkin Bloc	7,743	2.68%
against all		31,661	10.96%
Total		288,790	100%

=== 1999 ===
Summary of the 19 December 1999 Russian legislative election in the Cherepovets constituency
Candidate	Party	Votes	%
Aleksandr Orgolainen	Independent	106,282	35.69%
Aleksandr Ponomaryov (incumbent)	Communist Party	49,117	16.49%
Yevgeny Markov	Party of Pensioners	33,390	11.21%
Vyacheslav Ovchenkov	Our Home – Russia	25,364	8.52%
Vladimir Burov	Spiritual Heritage	13,721	4.61%
Natalya Ocherenkova	Independent	12,532	4.21%
Viktor Losev	Union of Right Forces	7,800	2.62%
Andrey Okunev	Peace, Labour, May	5,676	1.91%
against all		38,418	12.90%
Total		297,795	100%

=== 2003 ===
Summary of the 7 December 2003 Russian legislative election in the Cherepovets constituency
Candidate	Party	Votes	%
Aleksandr Orgolainen (incumbent)	United Russia	127,197	49.57%
Aleksandr Ponomaryov	Communist Party	40,086	15.62%
Lyudmila Sokova	Liberal Democratic Party	23,816	9.28%
Svetlana Kostereva	Independent	11,714	4.56%
Aleksey Vinogradov	Great Russia – Eurasian Union	6,649	2.59%
Anatoly Fedotov-Lyubomirsky	United Russian Party Rus'	4,241	1.65%
against all		37,956	14.79%
Total		257,099	100%

=== 2016 ===
Summary of the 18 September 2016 Russian legislative election in the Cherepovets constituency
Candidate	Party	Votes	%
Aleksey Kanayev	United Russia	78,446	42.90%
Aleksandr Morozov	Communist Party	26,401	14.44%
Ilya Gromov	Liberal Democratic Party	24,867	13.60%
Viktor Vavilov	A Just Russia	21,023	11.50%
Snezhana Goncharova	The Greens	5,091	2.78%
Nikolay Gorin	Yabloko	4,755	2.60%
Aleksandr Protasov	Communists of Russia	4,327	2.37%
Larisa Trubitsina	People's Freedom Party	3,924	2.15%
Sergey Katasonov	Party of Growth	3,909	2.14%
Nikolay Platonov	Rodina	3,489	1.91%
Total		182,872	100%

=== 2021 ===
Summary of the 17-19 September 2021 Russian legislative election in the Cherepovets constituency
Candidate	Party	Votes	%
Aleksey Kanayev (incumbent)	United Russia	72,210	37.68%
Aleksandr Morozov	Communist Party	50,859	26.54%
Olga Shirikova	Liberal Democratic Party	17,313	9.03%
Yury Yeregin	A Just Russia — For Truth	14,971	7.81%
Ivan Rytov	New People	13,358	6.97%
Igor Katukhin	Party of Pensioners	10,834	5.65%
Svetlana Voblikova	Rodina	5,819	3.04%
Total		191,661	100%

=== 2026 ===
Summary of the 18-20 September 2026 Russian legislative election in the Cherepovets constituency
Candidate	Party	Votes	%
Svetlana Grachyova	United Russia	49,809	25.42%
Aleksandr Morozov	Communist Party	47,787	24.39%
Irina Mozalevskaya	Liberal Democratic Party	20,606	10.52%
Denis Dolzhenko	New People	15,780	8.05%
Valery Borisov	Communists of Russia	15,404	7.86%
Aleksandr Morozov	Party of Pensioners	13,106	6.69%
Igor Trofimov	A Just Russia	12,078	6.16%
Vladimir Nikolayev	Yabloko	11,744	5.99%
Aleksey Starodubtsev	The Greens	3,633	1.85%
Total		195,946	100%
