= Dmitry Savelyev (politician, born 1971) =

Russian politician

- Дмитрий Савельев
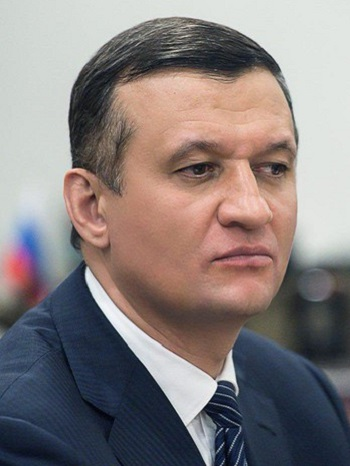

Member of the State Duma for Novosibirsk Oblast
- Incumbent
- Assumed office 12 October 2021
- Preceded by: Maksim Kudryavtsev
- Constituency: Central Novosibirsk (No. 136)

Member of the State Duma (Party List Seat)
- In office 21 December 2011 – 12 October 2021

Personal details
- Born: 25 May 1971 (age 55) Novosibirsk, RSFSR, USSR
- Party: United Russia (from 2020); LDPR (until 2020)
- Education: NSUEM; RANEPA

Dmitry Ivanovich Saveliev (Russian: Дмитрий Иванович Савельев; born 25 May 1971, Novosibirsk) is a Russian political figure and deputy of the 6th, 7th, and 8th State Dumas.

After graduating from the university, Saveliev engaged in business. In 2008, he joined the Liberal Democratic Party of Russia. From 2009 to 2013, he coordinated the Kemerovo branch of the party. In 2010–2011, he was an assistant to the deputy of the 5th State Duma Arkady Svistunov. On 4 December 2011 he was elected deputy of the 6th State Duma. He was re-elected in 2016 and 2021 for the 7th, and 8th State Dumas. He joined the United Russia in 2021.

== Sanctions ==
He was sanctioned by the UK government in 2022 in relation to the Russo-Ukrainian War.
