= Viktor Ignatov =

Russian politician (born 1968)

- Виктор Игнатов
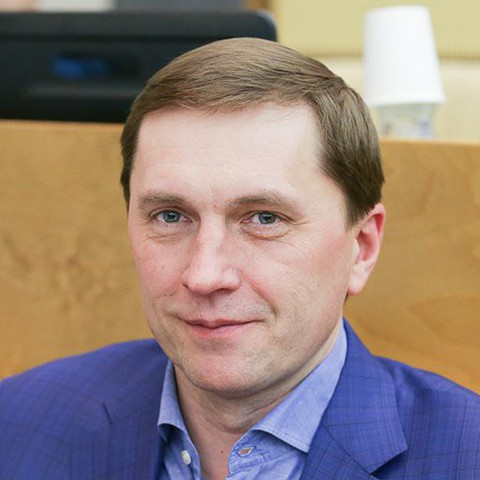

Member of the State Duma for Novosibirsk Oblast
- Incumbent
- Assumed office 5 October 2016
- Preceded by: Constituency re-established
- Constituency: Barabinsk (No. 138)

Personal details
- Born: 15 October 1968 (age 57) Novosibirsk, RSFSR, USSR
- Party: United Russia
- Education: Siberian State University of Telecommunications and Informatics

Viktor Alexandrovich Ignatov (Russian: Виктор Александрович Игнатов; born 15 October 1968, Novosibirsk) is a Russian political figure and a deputy of 7th and 8th State Dumas.

After graduating from the university in 1993, Ignatov started working as an assistant to the deputy of the State Duma Ivan Starikov. On 21 December 1997 Ignatov was elected deputy of the Novosibirsk Regional Council of Deputies of the 2nd convocation. In 2000 he was appointed the Advisor to the Governor of Novosibirsk Oblast. From 2001 to 2004, he was a member of the Federation Council from the Novosibirsk Oblast constituency. On 11 December 2005 he was elected deputy of the Novosibirsk Regional Council of Deputies of the 4th convocation. In May 2014, he became the first deputy to the Mayor of Novosibirsk.

In September 2016, Ignatov was elected deputy of the 7th State Duma from the Novosibirsk Oblast constituency. Since September 2021, he has served as a deputy of the 8th State Duma.

== Legislative activity ==
From 2016 to 2019, during his term as a deputy of the 7th convocation of the State Duma, he co-authored 12 legislative initiatives and amendments to draft federal laws.

== Awards ==
In December 2023, he received a letter of gratitude for his contribution to legislative activity and the development of parliamentarism in the Russian Federation.

By Presidential Decree No. 939 of December 11, 2023, he was awarded the Medal of the Order "For Merit to the Fatherland," 2nd class.

== Sanctions ==
Ignatov was sanctioned by the UK government in 2022 in relation to the Russo-Ukrainian War.
