= Constituencies of Russia =

Parliamentary constituencies used for elections to the Russian Duma

Map of all 225 Russian legislative constituencies in relation to their federal subjects. (Used since 2026 election)

Legislative constituencies are used in Russia to elect half of the seats (225) in the State Duma. Each Federal Subject gets a certain amount of constituencies, proportional to their population, with every Federal Subject getting at least one. Every constituency is a single-mandate one, meaning each constituency sends one representative (also known as a Deputy) to the State Duma.

Constituencies are created and their boundaries drawn by the Central Election Commission. According to Federal Law, the layout of constituencies are to be used for 10 years. Using these current constituencies, elections were held to the State Duma in 2016 and 2021.

== List ==
Below is the list of Constituencies of Russia, organised by federal subject.

Adygea

- Adygea constituency (No. 1)

Altai Republic

- Altai constituency (No. 2)

Bashkortostan

- Ufa constituency (No. 3)
- Blagoveshchensk constituency (No. 4)
- Beloretsk constituency (No. 5)
- Neftekamsk constituency (No. 6)
- Salavat constituency (No. 7)
- Sterlitamak constituency (No. 8)

Buryatia

- Buryat constituency (No. 9)

Dagestan

- Northern constituency (No. 10)
- Central constituency (No. 11)
- Southern constituency (No. 12)

Donetsk People's Republic

- Makiivka constituency
- Donetsk constituency
- Horlivka constituency

Ingushetia

- Ingush constituency (No. 13)

Kabardino-Balkaria

- Kabardino-Balkarian constituency (No. 14)

Kalmykia

- Kalmyk constituency (No. 15)

Karachay-Cherkessia

- Karachevo-Cherkess constituency (No. 16)

Republic of Karelia

- Karelian constituency (No. 17)

Komi Republic

- Syktyvkar constituency (No. 18)

Republic of Crimea

- Simferopol constituency (No. 19)
- Kerch constituency (No. 20)
- Yevpatoria constituency (No. 21)

Mari El

- Mari El constituency (No. 22)

Mordovia

- Mordovia constituency (No. 23)

Yakutia

- Yakutia constituency (No. 24)

North Ossetia

- North Ossetia constituency (No. 25)

Tatarstan

- Privolzhsky constituency (No. 26)
- Moskovsky constituency (No. 27)
- Nizhnekamsk constituency (No. 28)
- Naberezhnye Chelny constituency (No. 29)
- Almetyevsk constituency (No. 30)
- Central constituency (No. 31)

Tuva

- Tuva constituency (No. 32)

Udmurt Republic

- Udmurtia constituency (No. 33)
- Izhevsk constituency (No. 34)

Khakassia

- Khakassian constituency (No. 35)

Chechnya

- Chechnya constituency (No. 36)

Chuvashia

- Kanash constituency (No. 37)
- Cheboksary constituency (No. 38)

Altai Krai

- Barnaul constituency (No. 39)
- Rubtsovsk constituency (No. 40)
- Biysk constituency (No. 41)
- Slavgorod constituency (No. 42)

Zabaikalsky Krai

- Chita constituency (No. 43)
- Dauria constituency (No. 44)

Kamchatka Krai

- Kamchatka constituency (No. 45)

Krasnodar Krai

- Krasnodar constituency (No. 46)
- Krasnoarmeysky constituency (No. 47)
- Slavyansk-na-Kubani constituency (No. 48)
- Tuapse constituency (No. 49)
- Sochi constituency (No. 50)
- Tikhoretsk constituency (No. 51)
- Armavir constituency (No. 52)
- Kanevskaya constituency (No. 53)

Krasnoyarsk Krai

- Krasnoyarsk constituency (No. 54)
- Central constituency (No. 55)
- Divnogorsk constituency (No. 56)
- Yeniseysk constituency (No. 57)

Perm Krai

- Perm constituency (No. 58)
- Chusovoy constituency (No. 59)
- Kungur constituency (No. 60)
- Kudymkar constituency (No. 61)

Primorsky Krai

- Vladivostok constituency (No. 62)
- Artyom constituency (No. 63)
- Arsenyev constituency (No. 64)

Stavropol Krai

- Stavropol constituency (No. 65)
- Nevinnomyssk constituency (No. 66)
- Mineralnye Vody constituency (No. 67)
- Georgiyevsk constituency (No. 68)

Khabarovsk Krai

- Khabarovsk constituency (No. 69)
- Komsomolsk-na-Amure constituency (No. 70)

Amur Oblast

- Amur constituency (No. 71)

Arkhangelsk Oblast

- Arkhangelsk constituency (No. 72)
- Kotlas constituency (No. 73)

Astrakhan Oblast

- Astrakhan constituency (No. 74)

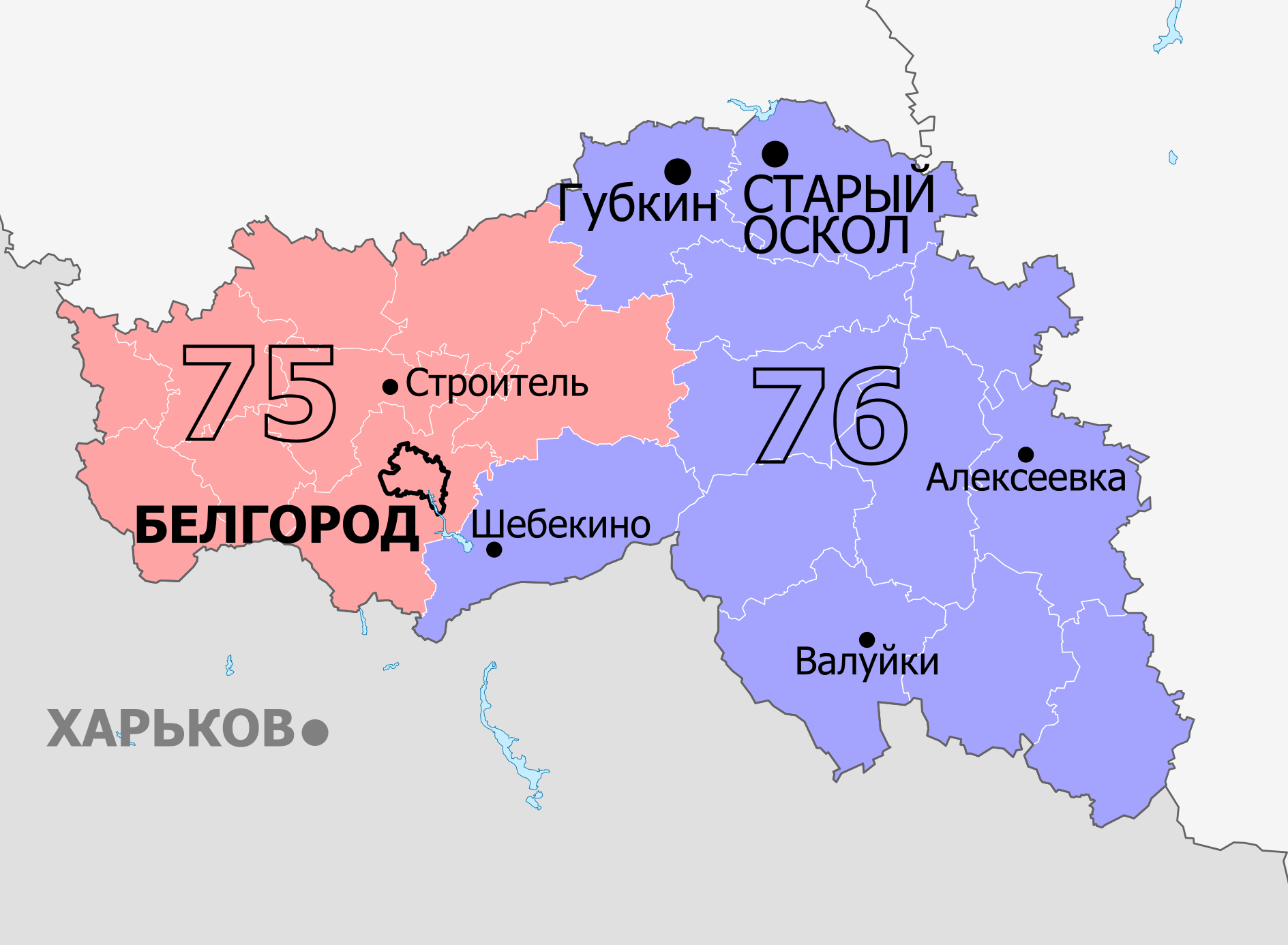
Legislative constituencies in Belgorod Oblast.

Belgorod Oblast

- Belgorod constituency (No. 75)
- Stary Oskol constituency (No. 76)

Bryansk Oblast

- Bryansk constituency (No. 77)
- Unecha constituency (No. 78)

Vladimir Oblast

- Vladimir constituency (No. 79)
- Suzdal constituency (No. 80)

Volgograd Oblast

- Volgograd constituency (No. 81)
- Krasnoarmeysky constituency (No. 82)
- Mikhaylovka constituency (No. 83)
- Volzhsky constituency (No. 84)

Vologda Oblast

- Vologda constituency (No. 85)
- Cherepovets constituency (No. 86)

Voronezh Oblast

- Voronezh constituency (No. 87)
- Pravoberezhny constituency (No. 88)
- Anna constituency (No.89)
- Pavlovsky constituency (No. 90)

Ivanovo Oblast

- Ivanovo constituency (No. 91)
- Kineshma constituency (No. 92)

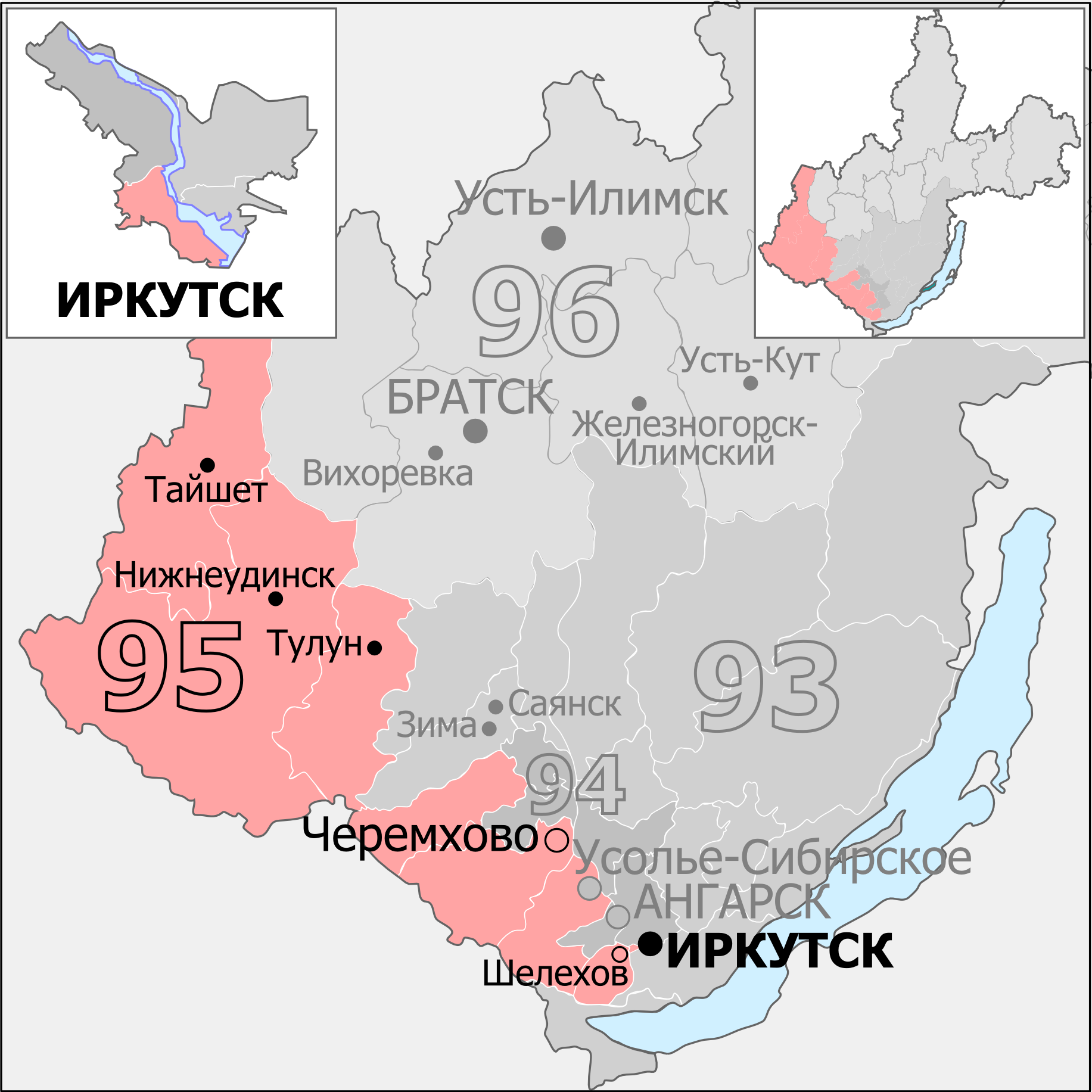
The 95th Constituency in Irkutsk Oblast has traces of Gerrymandering.

Irkustsk Oblast

- Irkutsk constituency (No. 93)
- Angarsk constituency (No. 94)
- Shelekhov constituency (No. 95)
- Bratsk constituency (No. 96)

Kaliningrad Oblast

- Kaliningrad constituency (No. 97)
- Central constituency (No. 98)

Kaluga Oblast

- Kaluga constituency (No. 99)
- Obninsk constituency (No. 100)

Kemerovo Oblast

- Kemerovo constituency (No. 101)
- Prokopyevsk constituency (No. 102)
- Zavodskoy constituency (No. 103)
- Novokuznetsk constituency (No. 104)

Kirov Oblast

- Kirov constituency (No. 105)
- Kirovo-Chepetsk constituency (No. 106)

Kostroma Oblast

- Kostroma constituency (No. 107)

Kurgan Oblast

- Kurgan constituency (No. 108)

Kursk Oblast

- Kursk constituency (No. 109)
- Seimsky constituency (No. 110)

Leningrad Oblast

- Vsevolozhsk constituency (No. 111)
- Kingisepp constituency (No. 112)
- Volkhov constituency (No. 113)

Lipetsk Oblast

- Lipetsk constituency (No. 114)
- Levoberezhny constituency (No. 115)

Magadan Oblast

- Magadan constituency (No. 116)

Moscow Oblast

- Balashikha constituency (No. 117)
- Dmitrov constituency (No. 118)
- Kolomna constituency (No. 119)
- Krasnogorsk constituency (No. 120)
- Lyubertsy constituency (No. 121)
- Odintsovo constituency (No. 122)
- Orekhovo-Zuyevo constituency (No. 123)
- Podolsk constituency (No. 124)
- Sergiyev Posad constituency (No. 125)
- Serpukhov constituency (No. 126)
- Shchyolkovo constituency (No. 127)

Murmansk Oblast

- Murmansk constituency (No. 128)

Nizhny Novgorod Oblast

- Nizhny Novgorod constituency (No. 129)
- Prioksky constituency (No. 130)
- Avtozavodsky constituency (No. 131)
- Kanavinsky constituency (No. 132)
- Bor constituency (No. 133)

Novgorod Oblast

- Novgorod constituency (No. 134)

Novosibirsk Oblast

- Novosibirsk constituency (No. 135)
- Central constituency (No. 136)
- Iskitim constituency (No. 137)
- Barabinsk constituency (No. 138)

Omsk Oblast

- Omsk constituency (No. 139)
- Moskalenki constituency (No. 140)
- Lyubinsky constituency (No. 141)

Orenburg Oblast

- Orenburg constituency (No. 142)
- Buguruslan constituency (No. 143)
- Orsk constituency (No. 144)

Oryol Oblast

- Oryol constituency (No. 145)

Penza Oblast

- Penza constituency (No. 146)
- Lermontovsky constituency (No. 147)

Pskov Oblast

- Pskov constituency (No. 148)

Rostov Oblast

- Rostov constituency (No. 149)
- Nizhnedonskoy constituency (No. 150)
- Taganrog constituency (No. 151)
- Southern constituency (No. 152)
- Belaya Kalitva constituency (No. 153)
- Shakhty constituency (No. 154)
- Volgodonsk constituency (No. 155)

Ryazan Oblast

- Ryazan constituency (No. 156)
- Skopin constituency (No. 157)

Samara Oblast

- Samara constituency (No. 158)
- Tolyatti constituency (No. 159)
- Krasnoglinsky constituency (No. 160)
- Zhigulyovsk constituency (No. 161)
- Promyshlenny constituency (No. 162)

Saratov Oblast

- Saratov constituency (No. 163)
- Balakovo constituency (No. 164)
- Balashov constituency (No. 165)
- Engels constituency (No. 166)

Sakhalin Oblast

- Sakhalin constituency (No. 167)

Sverdlovsk Oblast

- Sverdlovsk constituency (No. 168)
- Kamensk-Uralsky constituency (No. 169)
- Beryozovsky constituency (No. 170)
- Nizhny Tagil constituency (No. 171)
- Asbest constituency (No. 172)
- Pervouralsk constituency (No. 173)
- Serov constituency (No. 174)

Smolensk Oblast

- Smolensk constituency (No. 175)
- Roslavl constituency (No. 176)

Tambov Oblast

- Tambov constituency (No. 177)
- Rasskazovo constituency (No. 178)

Tver Oblast

- Tver constituency (No. 179)
- Zavolzhsky constituency (No. 180)

Tomsk Oblast

- Tomsk constituency (No. 181)
- Ob constituency (No. 182)

Tula Oblast

- Tula constituency (No. 183)
- Novomoskovsk constituency (No. 184)

Tyumen Oblast

- Tyumen constituency (No. 185)
- Zavodoukovsk constituency (No. 186)

Ulyanovsk Oblast

- Ulyanovsk constituency (No. 187)
- Radishchevo constituency (No. 188)

Chelyabinsk Oblast

- Chelyabinsk constituency (No. 189)
- Metallurgichesky constituency (No. 190)
- Korkino constituency (No. 191)
- Magnitogorsk constituency (No. 192)
- Zlatoust constituency (No. 193)

Yaroslavl Oblast

- Yaroslavl constituency (No. 194)
- Rostov constituency (No. 195)

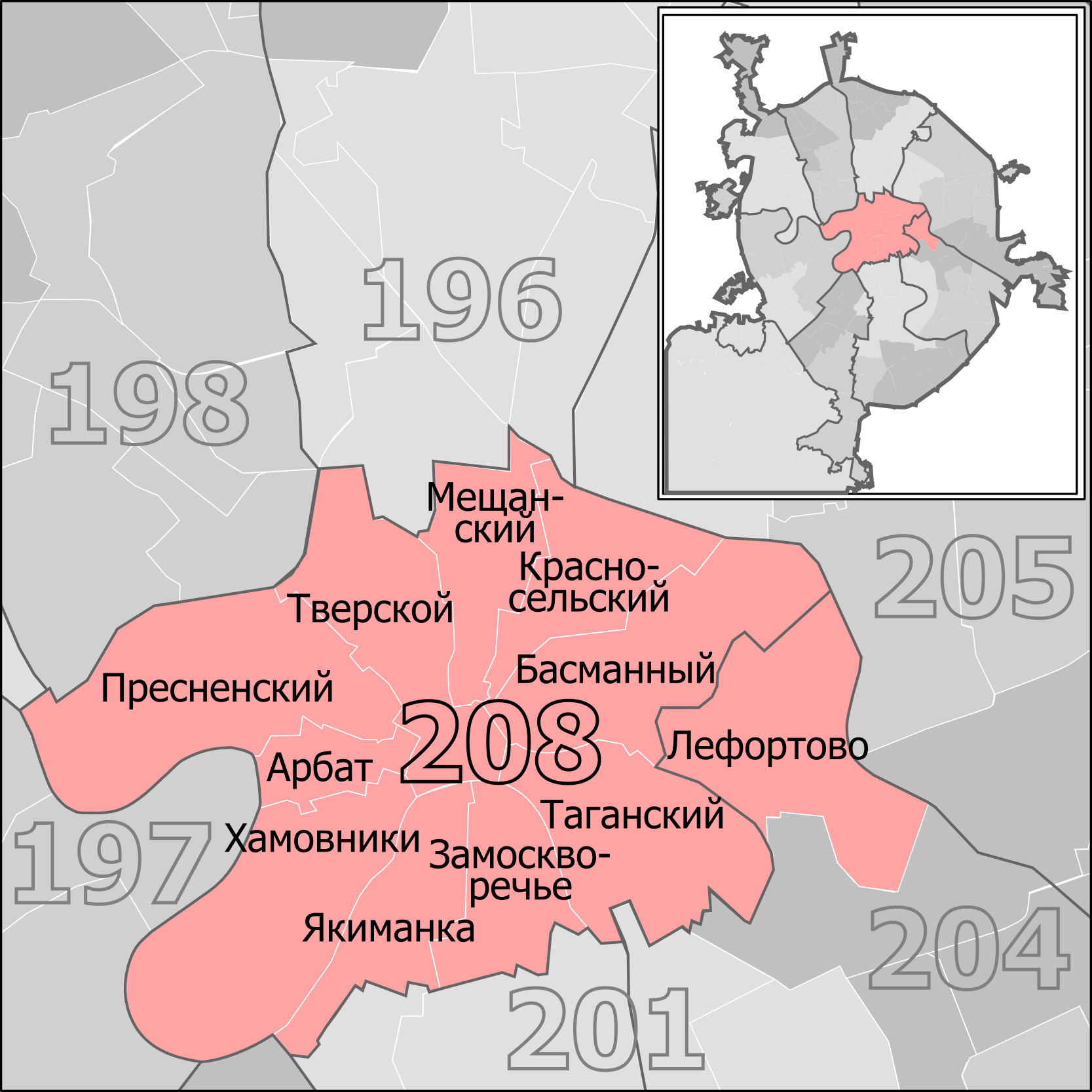
Moscow's Central constituency is often known as Russia's most pro-opposition constituency

Moscow Federal City

- Babushkinsky constituency (No. 196)
- Kuntsevo constituency (No. 197)
- Leningradsky constituency (No. 198)
- Lyublino constituency (No. 199)
- Medvedkovo constituency (No. 200)
- Nagatinsky constituency (No. 201)
- New Moscow constituency (No. 202)
- Orekhovo–Borisovo constituency (No. 203)
- Perovo constituency (No. 204)
- Preobrazhensky constituency (No. 205)
- Tushino constituency (No. 206)
- Khovrino constituency (No. 207)
- Central constituency (No. 208)
- Cheryomushki constituency (No. 209)
- Chertanovo constituency (No. 210)

Saint Petersburg Federal City

- Eastern constituency (No. 211)
- Western constituency (No. 212)
- Northern constituency (No. 213)
- North East constituency (No. 214)
- North West constituency (No. 215)
- Central constituency (No. 216)
- South East constituency (No. 217)
- Southern constituency (No. 218)

Sevastopol Federal City

- Sevastopol constituency (No. 219)

Jewish Autonomous Oblast

- Jewish constituency (No. 220)

Nenets AO

- Nenets constituency (No. 221)

Khanty-Mansi AO

- Khanty-Mansiysk constituency (No. 222)
- Nizhnevartovsk constituency (No. 223)

Chukotka AO

- Chukotka constituency (No. 224)

Yamalo-Nenets AO

- Yamalo-Nenets constituency (No. 225)

== Russian gerrymandering ==
Gerrymandering is the process of drawing the boundaries of electoral districts to favor a certain political force. In Russia, this comes through the "Lepestkovy" (Russian: лепестковый) drawing of constituencies. These "Lepestkovy" drawing usually involves major cities and/or regional capitals being split up between multiple constituencies. This is done to split up urban voters (who tend to be more liberal) and pair them up with a bigger rural population. This is present in many of Russia's constituencies.

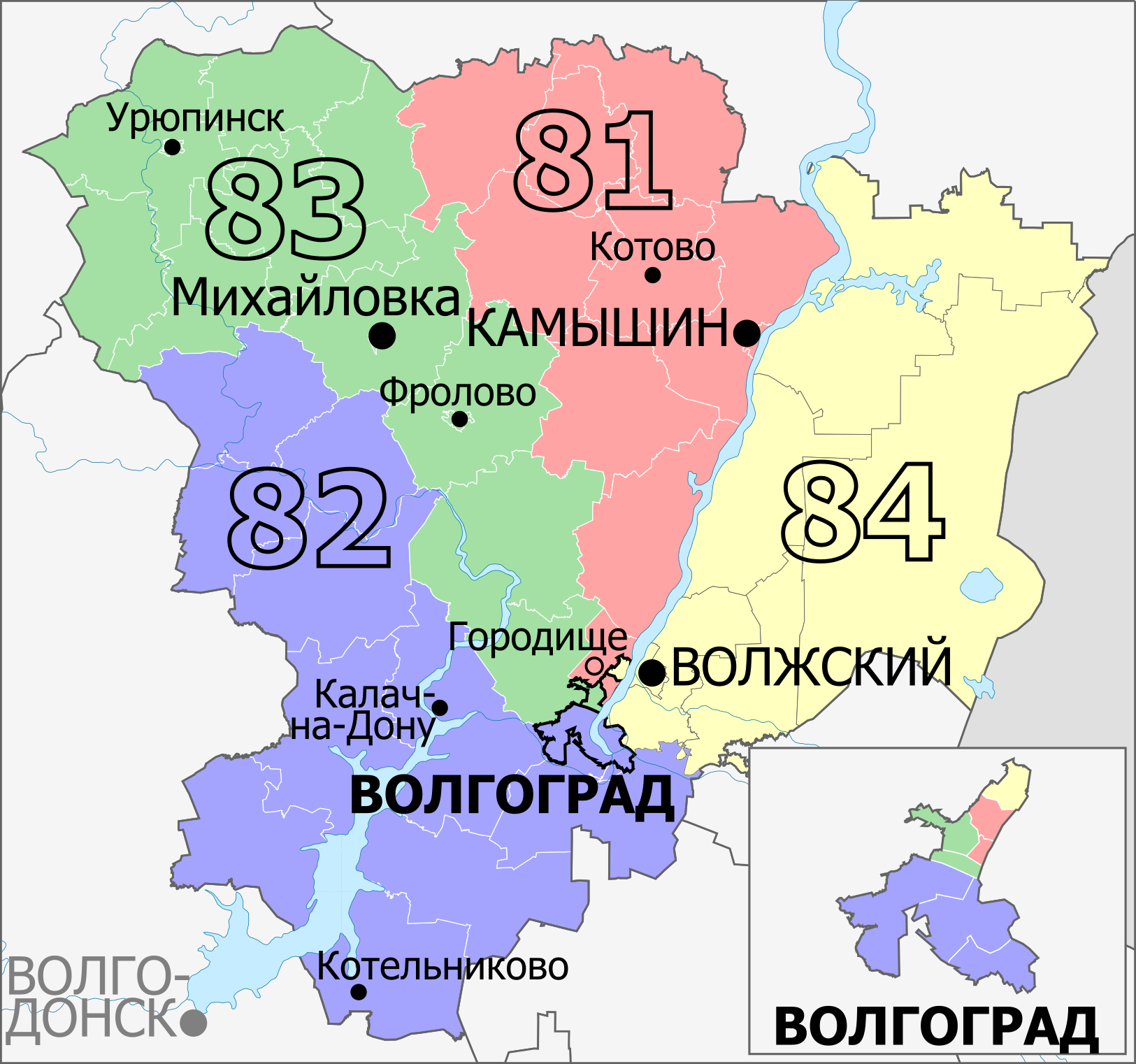
Volgograd Oblast, an excellent example of "Lepestkovy" Gerrymandering.

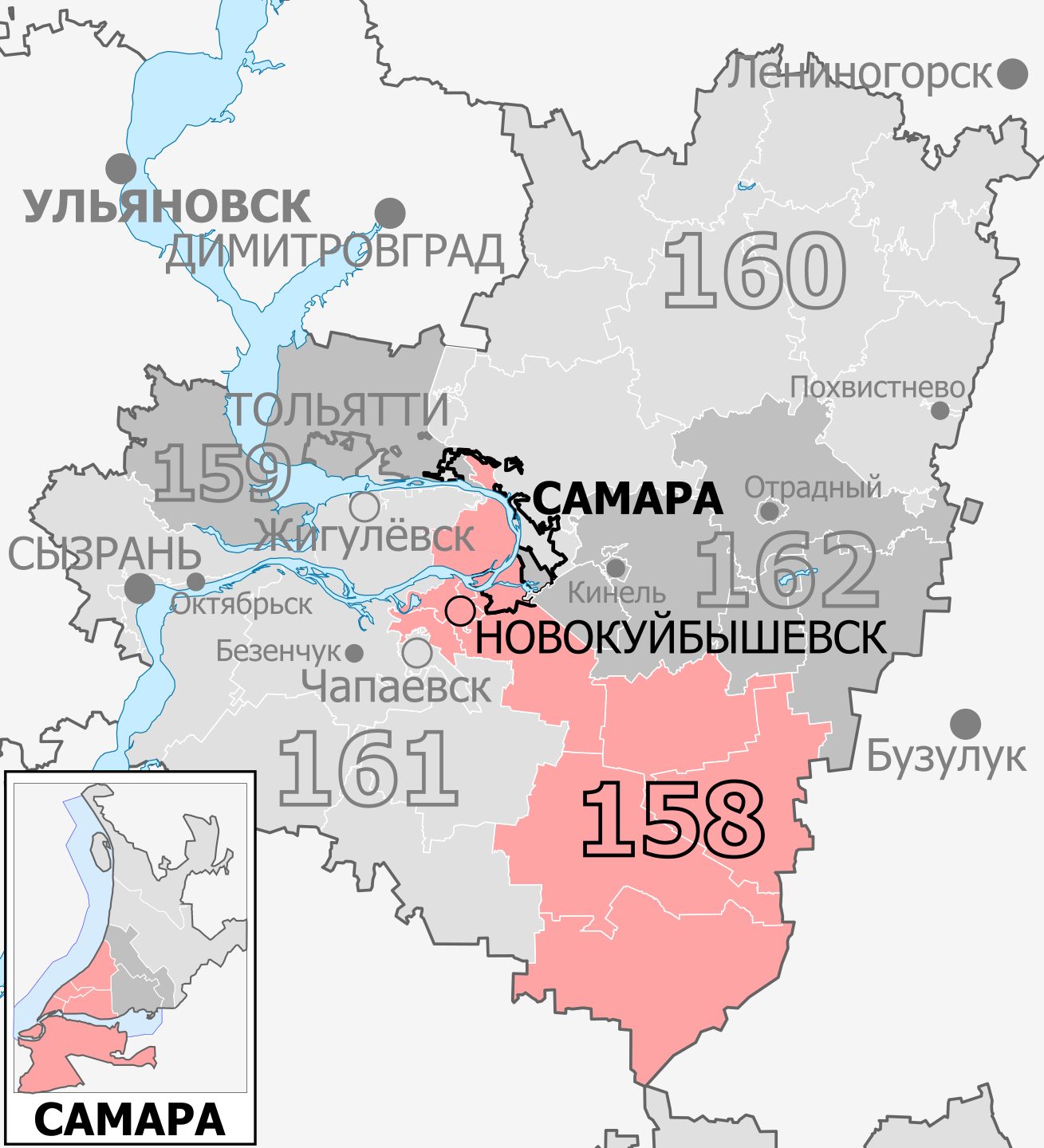
The 158th Constituency cuts right through Samara

== Redistricting ==
Constituencies are created and their boundaries drawn by the Central Election Commission. According to Federal Law, the layout of constituencies are to be used for 10 years.

The 2015-2025 layout was created on the basis that there are 109,902,583 voters in all of Russia.

The number of constituencies a Federal Subject is entitled to is determined using the Hare Quota. By dividing the total number of voters in Russia (109,902,583) by 225 (the total amount of Deputies, elected through single-mandate constituencies), you get 488,455.924, the desired average number of voters in a constituency, also known as the "Government Norm" (GN). The next step is to divide the number of voters in a Federal Subject by the GN, and then rounding down to the lowest whole number. If the remainder is sizeable, then the Federal Subject receives an additional constituency. Table with examples below.

Formula for determining the number of constituencies a Federal Subject receives.
Federal Subject	Number of voters in the Federal Subject	Number of voters in a Federal Subject ÷ GN	Provisional number of constituencies	Remainder	Additional number of constituencies	Final number of constituencies
Karelia	540,436	1.106	1	0.106	0	1
Tomsk Oblast	767,847	1.572	1	0.572	1	2
Dagestan	1,626,829	3.331	3	0.331	0	3
Altai Krai	1,899,225	3.888	3	0.888	1	4
Chelyabinsk Oblast	2,715,204	5.559	5	0.559	0	5
Moscow	7,318,019	14.982	14	0.982	1	15

== Former Constituencies ==
Bashkortostan

- Kalininsky constituency (No. 3)
- Sovetsky constituency (No. 7)

Primorsky Krai

- Ussuriysk constituency (No. 53)

Stavropol Krai

- Petrovsky constituency (No. 56)

Vladimir Oblast

- Kovrov constituency (No. 69)

Kursk Oblast

- Lgov constituency (No. 98)

Lipetsk Oblast

- Yelets constituency (No. 102)

Moscow Oblast

- Noginsk constituency (No. 110)

Murmansk Oblast

- Monchegorsk constituency (No. 115)

Nizhny Novgorod Oblast

- Dzerzhinsk constituency (No. 119)

Novosibirsk Oblast

- Zavodskoy constituency (No. 125)

Omsk Oblast

- Central constituency (No. 130)

Rostov Oblast

- Kamensk-Shakhtinsky constituency (No. 144)

Ryazan Oblast

- Shilovo constituency (No. 150)

Samara Oblast

- Novokuybyshevsk constituency (No. 151)

Smolensk Oblast

- Vyazma constituency (No. 168)

Tambov Oblast

- Michurinsk constituency (No. 170)

Tver Oblast

- Bezhetsk constituency (No. 172)

Tula Oblast

- Shchyokino constituency (No. 177)

Tyumen Oblast

- Ishim constituency (No. 178)

Moscow Federal City

- Universitetsky constituency (No. 201)

Saint Petersburg Federal City

- Admiralteysky constituency (No. 206)
- South West constituency (No. 212)

Komi-Permyak AO

- Komi-Permyak constituency (No. 216)

Koryak AO

- Koryak constituency (No. 217)

Taymyr AO

- Taymyr constituency (No. 219)

Ust-Orda Buryat AO

- Ust-Orda Buryat constituency (No. 220)

Evenk AO

- Evenk constituency (No. 224)

== Russian State Duma Election results by constituency ==
=== 2016 election results ===
Detailed Results of the 2016 Russian legislative Election by constituency.

Party	Constituency Vote		
Party	Votes	%	Seats
United Russia	25,162,770	50.12	203
Communist Party of the Russian Federation	6,492,145	12.93	7
A Just Russia	5,017,645	10.00	7
Liberal Democratic Party of Russia	5,064,794	10.09	5
Rodina	1,241,642	2.47	1
Independent	429,051	0.85	1
Civic Platform	364,100	0.73	1
Communists of Russia	1,847,824	3.68	0
Yabloko	1,323,793	2.64	0
Party of Growth	1,171,259	2.33	0
The Greens	770,076	1.53	0
Patriots of Russia	704,197	1.40	0
People's Freedom Party	530,862	1.06	0
Civilian Power	79,922	0.16	0
Invalid/blank votes	1,767,725	–	–
Total	51,967,805 (47.88%)	100	225
Registered voters	109,636,794 (100%)	–	–
Source: Central Election Commission

=== 2021 election results ===
Results of the 2021 Russian legislative election by constituency.

Party	Constituency Vote		
Party	Votes	%	Seats
United Russia	25,201,048	45.86	198
Communist Party of the Russian Federation	8,984,506	16.35	9
A Just Russia — For Truth	4,882,518	8.78	8
Independents	646,950	1.18	5
Liberal Democratic Party of Russia	3,234,113	5.89	2
Rodina	829,303	1.51	1
Party of Growth	515,020	0.94	1
Civic Platform	386,663	0.70	1
New People	2,684,082	4.88	0
Russian Party of Pensioners for Social Justice	1,969,986	3.58	0
Communists of Russia	1,639,774	2.98	0
Yabloko	1,091,837	1.99	0
The Greens	541,289	0.98	0
Russian Party of Freedom and Justice	372,867	0.68	0
Green Alternative	120,137	0.22	0
Invalid/blank votes	1,913,578	3.48	–
Total	55,013,671(50.83%)	100	225
Registered voters	108,231,085 (100%)		
Source: Central Election Commission

== See also ==
- Results of the 2016 Russian legislative election by constituency
- Political divisions of Russia
