= Anatoly Lokot =

Russian politician (born 1959)

- Анатолий Локоть

Mayor of Novosibirsk
- In office 23 April 2014 – 25 January 2024
- Preceded by: Vladimir Gorodetsky
- Succeeded by: Maksim Kudryavtsev

Member of the State Duma for Novosibirsk Oblast
- In office 29 December 2003 – 24 December 2007
- Preceded by: Aleksandr Karelin
- Succeeded by: constituencies abolished
- Constituency: Zayeltsovsky (No. 126) (Note: Known as Novosibirsk constituency (No. 135) since 2016)

Member of the State Duma (Party List Seat)
- In office 24 December 2007 – 8 April 2014

Member of the 9th State Duma
- Incumbent
- Assumed office 30 September 2026

Personal details
- Born: 18 January 1959 (age 67) Novosibirsk, RSFSR, USSR
- Citizenship: Soviet Union, Russia
- Party: Communist Party of the Russian Federation
- Education: Novosibirsk State Technical University

Anatoly Evgenevich Lokot (Russian: Анатолий Евгеньевич Локоть; born 18 January 1959, Novosibirsk) is a Russian Politician who has served as a State Duma Deputy, and the mayor of Novosibirsk, Russia. He serves as the State Duma Deputy from the Communist Party of the Russian Federation since 30 September 2026.

== Biography ==
In 1981, he graduated from the Department of Physics and Technics of the Novosibirsk State Technical University.

He serves as the 9th State Duma member for the Communist Party of the Russian Federation since 30 September 2026. He was previously a member of the State Duma and the mayor of Novosibirsk.

== Career ==
In December 1996 he became a deputy of the Novosibirsk Regional Council of Deputies from the Dzerzhinsky district of Novosibirsk. In December 2000 he joined the Novosibirsk City Council, where he headed the Communist Party faction.

From 2003 to 2014 he was a deputy of the State Duma of the Russian Federation. He was elected deputy of the 4th, 5th, and 6th convocations.

He was elected in April 2014 with around 44% of the vote. He unexpectedly narrowly defeated the United Russia candidate by uniting the bulk of opposition forces.

During the September 2019 elections, Anatoly was re-elected as mayor with over 50% of the vote.
