= Suzun =

Urban-type settlement in Russia

Suzun Сузун
- Urban-type settlement
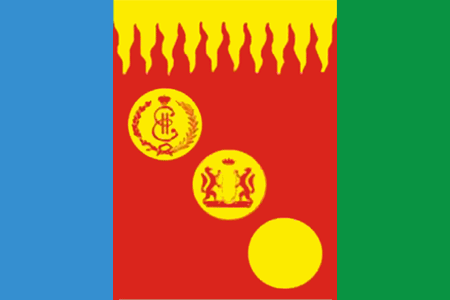
- Flag
- Interactive map of Suzun
- Location of Suzun Suzun (Novosibirsk Oblast)
- Coordinates: 53.7825°N 82.3189°E
- Country: Russia
- Federal subject: Novosibirsk Oblast
- Administrative district: Suzunsky District
- Founded: 1764
- Elevation: 147 m (482 ft)

Population (2010 Census)
  - Total: 15,364
  - Estimate (2025): 15,256 (−0.7%)
- Time zone: UTC+7 (MSK+4)
- Postal codes: 633621, 633623
- OKTMO ID: 50648151051

Suzun (Russian: Сузун) is an urban locality (a work settlement) and the administrative center of Suzunsky District of Novosibirsk Oblast, Russia. Population: 15,364 (2010 census); 15,565 (2002 census); 15,470 (1989 Soviet census).

Founded in 1763, the locality gained prominence for the mint that operated there from the reign of Catherine II (r. 1762–1796) until that of Nicholas I (r. 1825–1855) and produced copper coinage for the Siberian region. It is now a museum commemorating the history of local copper working.

== Etymology ==
Suzun is named after the Suzun River,^{[ru]} a tributary of the Ob River that flows through the town.
