= Strunino, Vladimir Oblast =

Town in Vladimir Oblast, Russia

Strunino Струнино
- Town
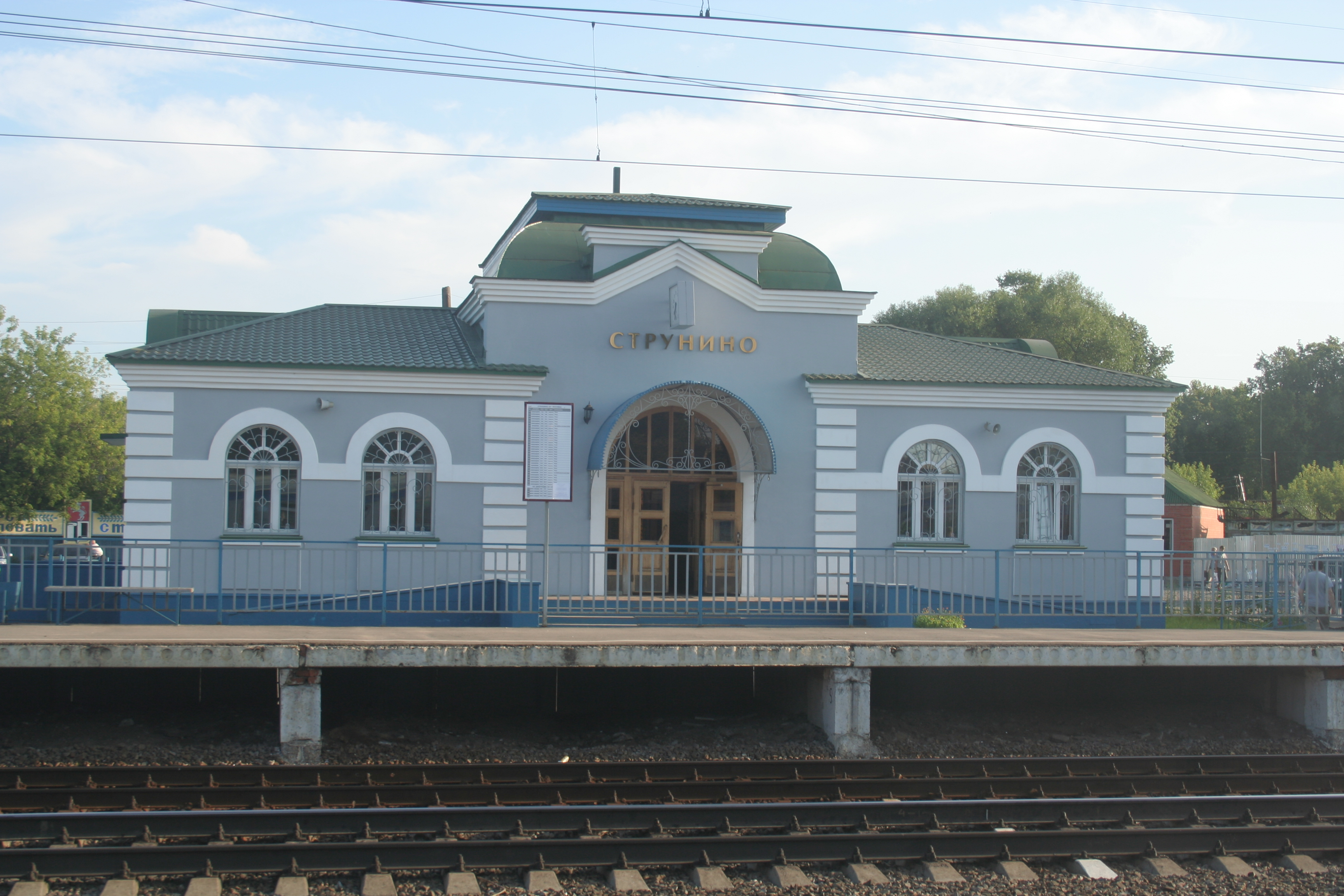
- Strunino railway station

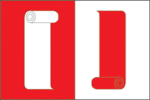
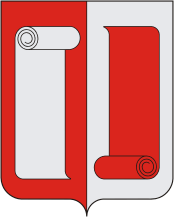
- Flag Coat of arms
- Interactive map of Strunino
- Location of Strunino Strunino (Vladimir Oblast)
- Coordinates: 56°22′N 38°35′E
- Country: Russia
- Federal subject: Vladimir Oblast
- Administrative district: Alexandrovsky District
- Known since: 1492
- Town status since: 1938
- Elevation: 170 m (560 ft)

Population (2010 Census)
  - Total: 14,369
  - Estimate (2021): 11,774 (−18.1%)

Municipal status
  - Municipal district: Alexandrovsky Municipal District
  - Urban settlement: Strunino Urban Settlement
  - Capital of: Strunino Urban Settlement
- Time zone: UTC+3 (MSK)
- Postal code: 601670
- OKTMO ID: 17605108001
- Website: www.strunino.org

Strunino (Russian: Стру́нино) is a town in Alexandrovsky District of Vladimir Oblast, Russia, located 131 kilometers (81 mi) northwest of Vladimir, the administrative center of the oblast. Population: 11,774 (2021 census); 14,369 (2010 census); 16,056 (2002 census); 18,658 (1989 Soviet census).

== History ==
The village of Strunino has been known since 1492. It was granted town status in 1938.

== Administrative and municipal status ==
Within the framework of administrative divisions, Strunino is directly subordinated to Alexandrovsky District. As a municipal division, the town of Strunino is incorporated within Alexandrovsky Municipal District as Strunino Urban Settlement.
