= Shipunovo, Sokolsky District, Vologda Oblast =

Shipunovo Шипуново
- Village
- Location within Vologda Oblast Location within Russia
- Coordinates: 59°38′N 40°49′E
- Country: Russia
- Region: Vologda Oblast
- District: Sokolsky District
- Time zone: UTC+3:00

Shipunovo (Russian: Шипуново) is a rural locality (a village) in Vorobyovskoye Rural Settlement, Sokolsky District, Vologda Oblast, Russia. The population was 17 as of 2002.

== Geography ==
Shipunovo is located 62 km (39 mi) northeast of Sokol (the district's administrative centre) by road. Pirogovo is the nearest rural locality.
