= Renat Suleymanov =

Russian politician

Renat Suleymanov MP
- Ренат Сулейманов
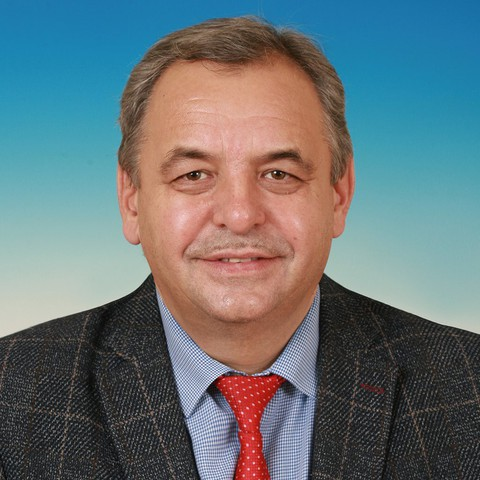

Member of the State Duma (Party List Seat)
- Incumbent
- Assumed office 12 October 2021

Personal details
- Born: 24 December 1965 (age 60) Novosibirsk, RSFSR, USSR
- Party: CPRF (from 1993); CPSU (until 1991)
- Education: Novosibirsk Law Institute (Tomsk State University)

Renat Ismailovich Suleymanov (Russian: Ренат Исмаилович Сулейманов; born 24 December 1965, Novosibirsk) is a Russian political figure and a deputy of the 8th State Duma.

Suleymanov served in the rocket forces in the Siberian Military District. After the army, he worked at the Novosibirskmetrostroy enterprise and participated in the construction of the Novosibirsk Metro. From 1989 to 1991, he was a member of the Communist Party of the Soviet Union. From 1990 to 1993, he was the deputy of the Central District Council of People's Deputies of Novosibirsk. In 1993, he joined the Communist Party of the Russian Federation. In 1996, 2000, 2005, 2010, 2015, he was elected deputy of the Council of Deputies of Novosibirsk. Since September 2021, he has served as deputy of the 8th State Duma.
