= Siberian State University of Telecommunications and Informatics =

- Сибирский государственный университет телекоммуникаций и информатики
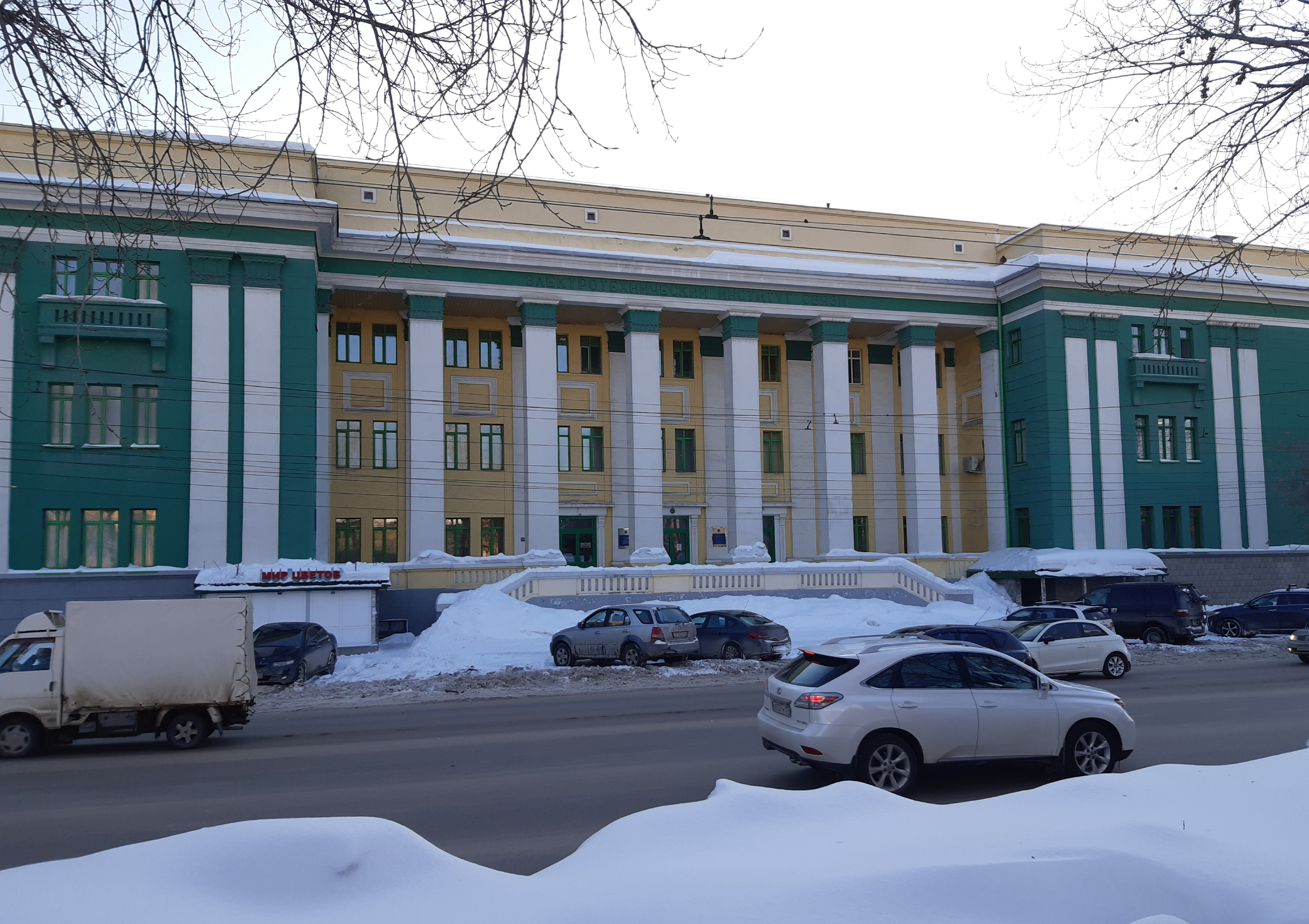
- Type: State University
- Established: 1953
- Location: Novosibirsk, Russia
- Website: sibsutis.ru

Siberian State University of Telecommunications and Informatics (Russian: Сибирский государственный университет телекоммуникаций и информатики) is a state university located in the Oktyabrsky District of Novosibirsk, Russia. It was founded in 1953.

== History ==
In 1953, the Novosibirsk Electrotechnical Institute of Communications was opened in Novosibirsk. It consisted of the Faculty of Radio Communication and Broadcasting and the Faculty of Telephone and Telegraph. In 1998, the institute was renamed into Siberian State University of Telecommunications and Informatics.

== Faculties ==
- Faculty of Automatic Telecommunications
- Faculty of Multiservice Telecommunication Systems
- Faculty of Mobile Radio Communication and Multimedia
- Faculty of Informatics and Computer Engineering
- Faculty of Humanities
