= Suzunsky District =

Suzunsky District Сузунский район
- District
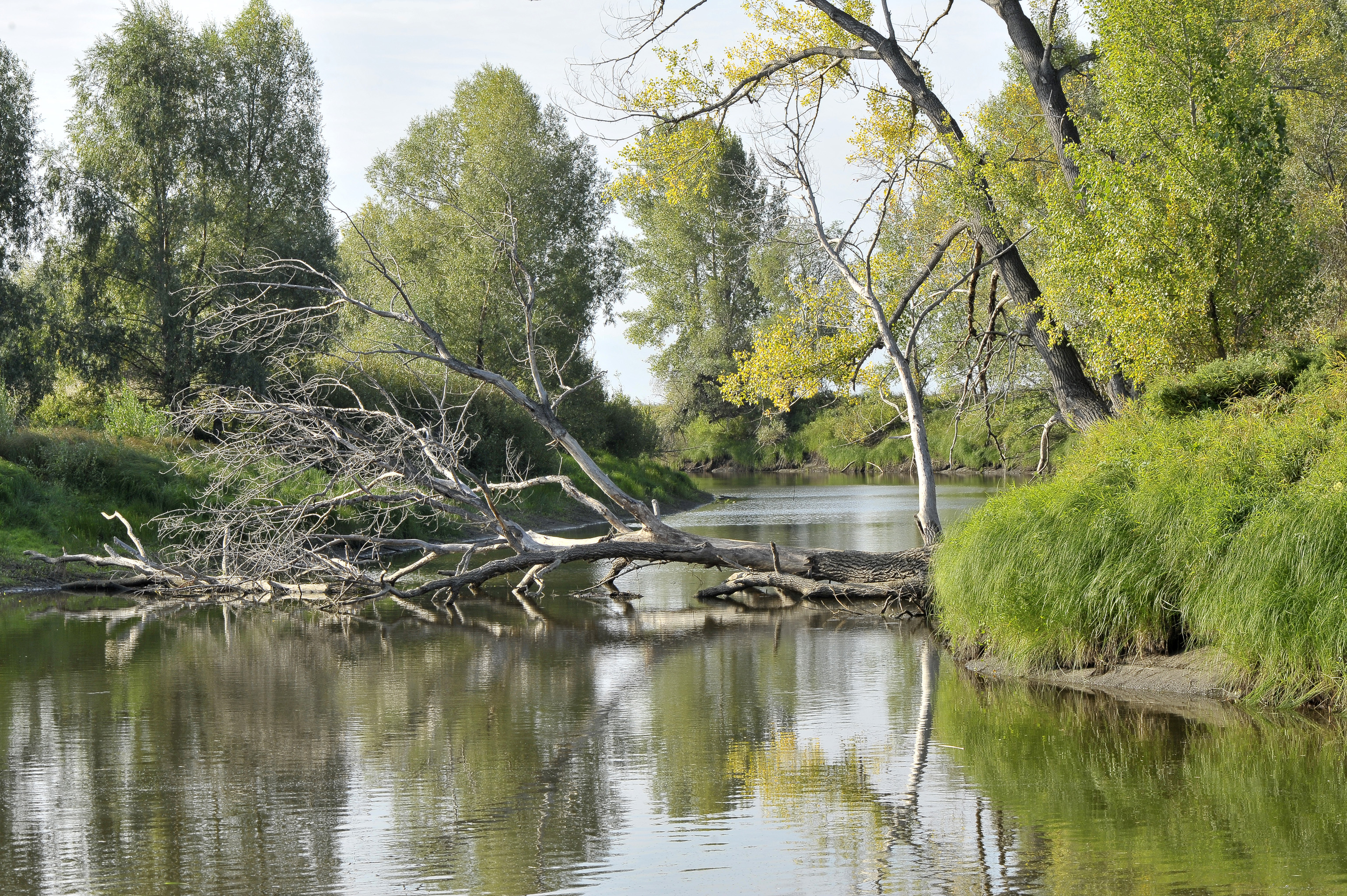

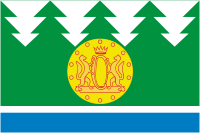
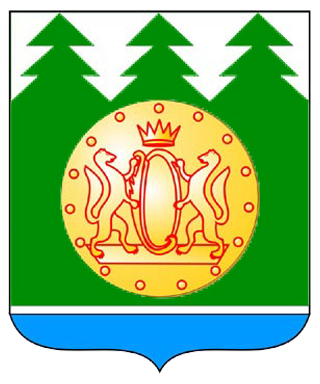
- Flag Coat of arms
- Location of Suzunsky District in Novosibirsk Oblast
- Coordinates: 53°47′N 82°19′E
- Country: Russia
- Federal subject: Novosibirsk Oblast
- Administrative center: Suzun

Area
  - Total: 4,746 km^{2} (1,832 sq mi)

Population (2010 Census)
  - Total: 32,592
  - Density: 6.867/km^{2} (17.79/sq mi)
  - Urban: 47.1%
  - Rural: 52.9%

Administrative structure
  - Inhabited localities: 1 urban-type settlements, 41 rural localities

Municipal structure
  - Municipally incorporated as: Suzunsky Municipal District
  - Municipal divisions: 1 urban settlements, 14 rural settlements
- Time zone: UTC+7 (MSK+4)
- OKTMO ID: 50648000
- Website: https://suzun.nso.ru/

Suzunsky District (Russian: Сузу́нский райо́н) is an administrative and municipal district (raion), one of the thirty in Novosibirsk Oblast, Russia. It is located in the southeast of the oblast. The area of the district is 4,746 square kilometers (1,832 sq mi). Its administrative center is the urban locality (a work settlement) of Suzun. Population: 32,592 (2010 Census); 34,917 (2002 Census); 35,677 (1989 Soviet census). The population of Suzun accounts for 47.1% of the district's total population.
