= Ob, Russia =

Town in Novosibirsk Oblast, Russia

Ob Обь
- Town
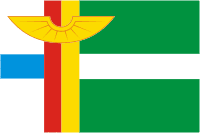
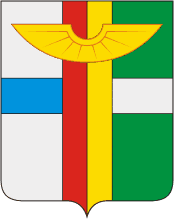
- Flag Coat of arms
- Interactive map of Ob
- Location of Ob Ob (Novosibirsk Oblast)
- Coordinates: 54°59′30″N 82°42′45″E
- Country: Russia
- Federal subject: Novosibirsk Oblast
- Founded: 1934
- Town status since: 1969
- Elevation: 110 m (360 ft)

Population (2010 Census)
  - Total: 25,382
  - Estimate (2021): 30,369 (+19.6%)

Administrative status
  - Subordinated to: Town of Ob
  - Capital of: Town of Ob

Municipal status
  - Urban okrug: Ob Urban Okrug
  - Capital of: Ob Urban Okrug
- Time zone: UTC+7 (MSK+4)
- Postal codes: 633100, 633102, 633103, 633104
- Dialing code: +7 38373
- OKTMO ID: 50717000001

Ob (Russian: Обь) is a town in Novosibirsk Oblast, Russia, located 17 kilometers (11 mi) west of Novosibirsk, the administrative center of the oblast. Population: 25,382 (2010 census); 24,473 (2002 census); 25,014 (1989 Soviet census).

== History ==
Originally known as the settlement of Tolmachyovo (Толмачёво), it was renamed Ob in 1934 and granted town status in 1969.

== Administrative and municipal status ==
Within the framework of administrative divisions, it is incorporated as the Town of Ob—an administrative unit with the status equal to that of the districts. As a municipal division, the Town of Ob is incorporated as Ob Urban Okrug.

== Transportation ==
The town hosts the Novosibirsk Tolmachevo Airport.

The headquarters of the S7 Airlines company is located in Ob, which is currently Russia's fastest growing airline and has passed Aeroflot as Russia's largest domestic airline.

== See also ==
- Ob (river)
- Ob sea (Novosibirsk Reservoir)
