= Rodina =

Rodina (Bulgarian and Russian Родина: "homeland", Czech: "family") may refer to:

== People with the surname ==
- Anastassiya Rodina (born 1991), Kazakhstani handball player
- Evgeniya Rodina (born 1989), Russian tennis player
- Marina Rodina (born 1980), birth name of Russian YouTube user
- Irina Rodina (born 1973), Russian judoka
- Vadym Rodina (born 1988), Ukrainian football defender
- Viktoria Rodina (born 1989), Russian politician
- Yelena Gulyayeva (née Rodina, 1967), Russian high jumper

== Places ==
- Rodina, a village in Ariniș Commune, Maramureș County, Romania
- Rodina Stadium (Khimki), Russia
- Rodina Stadium (Kirov), Russia
- Hotel Rodina in Sofia, Bulgaria

== Other uses ==
- Rodina (political bloc), a political bloc of Russia
- Rodina (political party), a political party of Russia
- Rodina (TV series), a Russian television series based on the Israeli series Hatufim and the American series Homeland
- Rodina (magazine), a Russian historical illustrated magazine
- Rodina-class motorship, a Russian river passenger ship
- Rodina watch I, first Russian automatic wristwatch, made by the First Moscow Watch Factory from 1956 through the early 1960s
- The Rodina, a graphic design studio based in The Hague, Netherlands
- Rodina Kirov, a Russian bandy club
- Rodina, a song by Soviet rock band DDT

== See also ==
- Rodinia, ancient supercontinent derived from rodina (Russian: родина, "homeland")
- Mother Motherland (disambiguation), a personification of the Soviet Union in artwork
