= Russian All-People's Union =

Russian All-People's Union Российский общенародный союз Rossiyskiy obshchenarodnyy soyuz
- Abbreviation: ROS
- Leader: Sergey Baburin
- Founded: 26 October 1991
- Dissolved: 21 July 2025
- Preceded by: Russian Platform of the CPSU
- Headquarters: 11th building, Trokhgornyy pereulok, Moscow, Russia
- Newspaper: Russian herald
- Youth wing: Union of Russian Students
- Ideology: Left-conservatism; Left-wing nationalism
- Political position: Left-wing
- Colours: Black; Gold; White
- Slogan: "Let's build the Russia of our dreams!" (Russian: "Построим Россию нашей мечты!")
- Seats in the Federation Council: 0 / 170
- Seats in the State Duma: 0 / 450
- Seats in the Regional Parliaments: 0 / 3,994

Party flag

Website
- rospartya.ru

Old logo of the ROS, with old inscription "Rus' – Russia – USSR – Russian Federation"

The Russian All-People's Union (Russian: Российский общенародный союз, romanized: Rossiyskiy obshchenarodnyy soyuz; ROS) was a Russian political party formed in October 1991. In 2001, it merged into the People's Union (Russian: Народная Воля, romanized: Narodnaya Volya). In 2008, it was reorganized when the Narodnaya Volya dissolved itself. Its leader was Sergey Baburin.

The organization was founded by Russian nationalist-oriented members of the Russian Platform of the CPSU, and was launched on 26 October 1991 by Russian Supreme Soviet deputies of the faction Rossiya. According to Nikolai Pavlov, one of the ROS leaders, the party was established as a "patriotic and democratic" force with the aim of uniting parties of socialist orientation. Pavlov also stated that they had similar positions with more centrist organizations like the Cadet Party of Mikhail Astafyev, Viktor Aksiuchits' Christian Democratic Party of Russia, and the Democratic Party of Russia; one of the ROS member organizations in 1992 was the Russian Party of Communists, which was led by A. Kryuchkov. The ROS was part of the United Opposition and later National Salvation Front, belonging to the FNS right-wing faction. Besides socialist tendencies, the ROS had connections with traditional Russian nationalists and monarchists, and promoted pan-Slavist policies, including support for Serbia's expansion.

The party published newspaper Vremya (Time). The ROS took part in the 1995 Russian legislative election within the bloc Power to the People!, which was led by Baburin and Nikolai Ryzhkov. It won 1.6% of votes, failing to pass the 5% barrier; the ROS got nine seats, all from majoritarian districts. The party co-operated with other formations of nationalist-communist orientation, such as the Communist Party of Russian Federation, whose candidate Gennady Zyuganov (supported by the ROS) was defeated in the 1996 Russian presidential election by incumbent Boris Yeltsin. In 2001, the ROS joined with three other nationalist parties to form the People's Union (Narodnaya Volya). In 2008, the ROS was reorganized when Narodnaya Volya dissolved itself.

On 22 December 2017, the ROS nominated Sergey Baburin as its candidate for the 2018 Russian presidential election. On 24 December, Baburin filed registration documents with the Central Election Commission (CEC). The CEC rejected Baburin's bid on 25 December because it identified violations in the information provided regarding 18 of his party's 48 representatives. Baburin resubmitted the documents, and they were approved by the CEC.

Baburin was nominated by his party again in December 2023 during the party's congress. He submitted documents to participate in the election on 26 December, which were registered on 29 December. Baburin collected the required number of signatures, but decided to withdraw on the day before the deadline to submit signatures 30 January 2024 and endorsed Putin for the 2024 election. The party was dissolved on 21 July 2025 for failing to take part in elections since 2018.

In June 2025, the Russian Ministry of Justice filed a lawsuit in the Supreme Court to liquidate ROS, citing the party's failure to participate in elections over the past seven years. On 21 July 2025, the Supreme Court upheld the claim, liquidating the party. The party's leader, Sergey Baburin, expressed his disagreement with its dissolution, calling it a "political action."

== Electoral results ==
=== Presidential elections ===
Election	Candidate	First round		Second round		Result
Election	Candidate	Votes	%	Votes	%	Result
1996	Endorsed Gennady Zyuganov	24,211,686	32.03%	30,102,288	40.31%	Lost ✗
2000	Endorsed Vladimir Putin	39,740,434	52.94%			Elected ✓
2004	Endorsed Sergey Glazyev	2,850,063	4.10%			Lost ✗
2008	Did not contest					
2012	Did not contest					
2018	Sergey Baburin	479,013	0.65%			Lost ✗
2024	Endorsed Vladimir Putin	76,277,708	88.48%			Elected ✓

=== Legislative elections ===
Election	Party leader	Performance					Rank	Government
Election	Party leader	Votes	%	± pp	Seats	+/–	Rank	Government
1993	Sergey Baburin	Did not submit enough signatures to appear on ballot						Extra-parliamentary
1995	Sergey Baburin	1,112,873	1.61% Power to the People!	New	9 / 450	New	13th	Opposition
1999	Sergey Baburin	245,266	0.37%	▼1.24	2 / 450	▼7	▼18th	Opposition
2003	Sergey Baburin	5,470,429	9.02% NPS Rodina	New	38 / 450	▲36	▲4th	Opposition
2007	Sergey Baburin	People's Will was not admitted to the elections; supported the CPRF						Extra-parliamentary
2011	Sergey Baburin	People's Union did not contest; supported the LDPR						Extra-parliamentary
2016	Sergey Baburin	Did not contest						Extra-parliamentary
2021	Sergey Baburin	Did not contest						Extra-parliamentary

== See also ==
- Liberal Democratic Party of Russia
- List of political parties in Russia
- Paternalistic conservatism
- Pochvennichestvo
- Social conservatism
