= Rodina (political bloc) =

"Rodina" (People's Patriotic Union) "Родина" (Народно-патриотический союз)
- Abbreviation: Rodina, NPS
- Leaders: Sergey Glazyev; Dmitry Rogozin; Valentin Varennikov
- State Duma faction leader: Sergey Glazyev (until March 2004); Dmitry Rogozin (since March 2004)
- Founders: Sergey Glazyev; Dmitry Rogozin; Sergey Baburin; Yury Skokov
- Founded: 14 September 2003
- Dissolved: 5 June 2005 (de facto)
- Succeeded by: Rodina (political party)
- Member parties: See Composition
- Ideology: Russian nationalism Economic socialism Social conservatism Statism
- Political position: Syncretic
- Colours: Red Gold
- State Duma (2003): 37 / 450 (8%)

Party flag

Website
- www.rodina-nps.ru

The People's Patriotic Union "Rodina" (lit. 'Motherland'; Russian: Народно-патриотический союз «Родина», romanized: Narodno-patrioticheskiy soyuz «Rodina» (Note: Official name: "Rodina" (People's Patriotic Union) "Родина" (Народно-патриотический союз))) was a Russian political bloc that existed from 2003 to 2005, founded by economist Sergey Glazyev. Its three main components were the Party of Russian Regions (renamed Rodina in February 2004), the Party of National Revival "People's Will", and the Socialist United Party of Russia (SEPR). The bloc was described as left-wing patriotic, combining elements of nationalism and socialism, and shifting toward a more radical nationalist direction under the influence of Dmitry Rogozin.

The Rodina bloc has been gradually collapsing since February 2004, when Glazyev was expelled from the PRR and, in March, dismissed as leader of the State Duma faction. In October 2004, the SEPR left, accusing Rogozin of appropriating the Rodina brand. In June 2005, People's Will left the Rogozin-dominated bloc and, together with SEPR, founded a separate State Duma faction, "Rodina (People's Will – SEPR)". Rogozin's Rodina party was headed by Alexander Babakov since March 2006, and merged into A Just Russia in October 2006.

== History ==
=== Background ===
The idea of a bloc led by Sergei Glazyev, Advisor to General Alexander Lebed, a member of the CPRF faction, began to be widely discussed in the spring of 2003. One of the proposed names was "Comrade" (Russian: Товарищ, lit. 'Tovarishch'), the same name given to the news agency created to support the bloc. Three main options for the bloc's composition and ideological direction were speculated upon: a "civilized left" bloc (led by Glazyev and Oleg Shein); a broad "communist-patriotic" bloc (led by Valentin Varennikov, Igor Rodionov, Sergei Baburin, Sergei Glazyev); and a "left-patriotic" non-communist bloc (led by Dmitry Rogozin, Viktor Gerashchenko, Alexei Podberezkin and Yuri Skokov). The final version of the bloc was closer to the third option.

=== Formation ===
On 23 August 2003, during the "Elections 2003" forum organized by the Central Election Commission, an Agreement on Joint Activities of People's Patriotic Forces was signed, formalizing a coalition that became the basis of the bloc led by Glazyev. Glazyev himself was the first signatory of the agreement as both chairman of the Congress of Russian Communities and co-chairman of the Party of Russian Regions. The agreement was also signed by the Russian Party of Labor, the Union of People for Education and Science, the Eurasia Party, the For a Holy Russia party, the Russian Traditionalist Party, the Social Liberal Union of the Russian Federation, the People's Patriotic Union of Youth, the Sotsprof trade union, and others.

The People's Patriotic Union "Rodina" bloc was formally established at a congress on 14 September 2003, by three parties: the Party of Russian Regions, the Party of National Revival "People's Will" and the Socialist United Party of Russia "Spiritual Heritage". Other parties and organizations that had signed the agreement a month earlier joined the bloc informally. During the congress, it was announced that for the 2003 legislative election, representatives of 13 parties would be included on the bloc's federal electoral list, while representatives of 28 coalition parties and movements would be nominated in single-mandate constituencies with the bloc's support. The composition of the federal electoral list was also announced, and the Supreme Council, the bloc's governing body for the election campaign and the term of the 4th State Duma, was established.

The leaders of the bloc's list were Glazyev, Rogozin, former GKChP member Valentin Varennikov, former chairman of the Central Bank Viktor Gerashchenko, and chairman of the People's Will party Sergei Baburin.

Sergey Glazyev, Dmitry Rogozin, Sergey Baburin, and Yury Skokov were elected co-chairs of the Supreme Council. The Supreme Council also included Alexander Babakov, Alexander Vatagin, Viktor Gerashchenko, Sergei Glotov, Oleg Denisov, Alexander Krutov, Oleg Kutafin, Nikolai Leonov, Elena Mukhina Nikolai Pavlov, Andrey Savelyev, Sergey Shishkarev, Georgy Shpak, and Alexander Fomenko and others. After the bloc's list was finalized, Alexander Dugin's Eurasia Party and Vyacheslav Igrunov's SLON party withdrew from Rodina, declaring their disagreement with the coalition's departure from its original social focus toward a sharply nationalistic approach. During the autumn of 2003, the Russian Party of Labor also left the bloc.

=== 2003 State Duma election ===
On 24 September 2003, the Central Electoral Commission registered the Rodina bloc. During the election campaign, Rodina used social-patriotic and anti-oligarchic slogans, and most of all criticized the Union of Right Forces.

In September 2003, candidates representing the extreme nationalist movements "Spas" and "Russian Revival," who had been included on the list through the People's Will party quota, were removed from the bloc's lists. This was done at the insistence of Dmitry Rogozin, who, according to the bloc's then press secretary, Olga Sagareva, was pressured by the Presidential Administration.

In the 2003 legislative election, the People's Patriotic Union "Rodina" bloc's list placed fourth, garnering 9% of the votes, winning 29 party-list seats and eight seats in single-mandate constituencies, including Glazyev himself. In January 2004, the Rodina faction in the 4th State Duma was formed from the deputies, list members, and single-mandate candidates elected from the bloc, initially comprising 36 deputies.

The head of the Rodina list in Moscow was Alexander Lebedev, the head of the National Reserve Bank, who also ran in the 2003 Moscow mayoral election that was taking place simultaneously. On the eve of elections, Lebedev announced his break with the bloc, citing his disagreement with the "extremely extremist statements of certain bloc leaders." However, Lebedev remained on the bloc's electoral list and was elected to the State Duma, subsequently joining the United Russia faction. In the mayoral election, Lebedev finished second with 12.4%.

=== 2004 presidential election ===
The 2004 presidential election campaign, which began immediately after the State Duma election, sparked a serious crisis within the Rodina bloc. Sergei Glazyev, who publicly intended to run for President, had counted on the bloc's support, but on 30 December 2003, the Bloc's Supreme Council decided by a one-vote majority to support the candidacy of Viktor Gerashchenko, nominated by the Party of Russian Regions. In January 2004, the Central Election Commission refused to register Gerashchenko, citing that he had been nominated by only one of the bloc's member parties, not by the bloc as a whole. Sergei Glazyev ultimately ran as an independent self-nominated candidate without the bloc's official support.

On 30 January 2004, Glazyev organized the founding congress of the Rodina political movement, where he was elected chairman. This led to an open, heated conflict between Glazyev and the bloc's other leaders, Rogozin and Baburin. In February 2004, Glazyev received the support of the People's Will party, contrary to the opinion of party chairman Baburin. However, he was not supported by the congresses of the Party of Russian Regions and the Socialist United Party of Russia (SEPR), both of which endorsed Vladimir Putin's candidacy.

In the presidential election, Sergei Glazyev received 4.1% of the vote, finishing third behind Vladimir Putin and Communist candidate Nikolay Kharitonov.

In the concurrent gubernatorial election in the Ryazan Oblast, former Airborne Forces commander Georgy Shpak, a State Duma deputy from Rodina bloc, won, becoming the first and only representative of the bloc to become the region's governor. However, by the fall of 2004, Shpak had severed ties with Rodina.

=== Bloc collapse ===
On 15 February 2004, the Party of Russian Regions renamed itself the Rodina party. At the same PRR congress, the leader of the Rodina bloc, PRR co-chairman Sergei Glazyev, was expelled from the party, and Viktor Gerashchenko was elected in his place. On 3 March 2004, Glazyev was removed from his post as chairman of the Rodina State Duma faction. The new chairman of the faction was Dmitry Rogozin, who was also elected chairman of the Rodina party on 6 July 2004.

After being expelled from the Rodina party and faction, Glazyev formed the political movement "For a Decent Life"

In October 2004, the Socialist United Party of Russia left the Bloc's Supreme Council, accusing Dmitry Rogozin's party of "arbitrarily renaming itself" to the Rodina party and "appropriated the right to exclusive use of the bloc's name." In response, Rogozin stated that the SEPR, which he classified as "a host of dwarf quasi-parties getting in the way," was brought in only to ensure the legal purity of the bloc formation procedure.

Throughout 2004, discussions about uniting People's Will and Rodina took place, despite conflicts between Rogozin and Baburin: Baburin accused Rogozin of "appropriating a brand belonging to the entire bloc", but made repeated unsuccessful attempts to unite the parties on an equal basis. However, since December 2004, merger talks have stalled, as People's Will refused to dissolve itself and join the Rodina party. On 25 February 2005, Baburin canceled the merger, declaring the impossibility of unification under Rodina's terms.

On 5 June 2005, Baburin's People Will party registered its own faction in the State Duma, initially consisting of nine members. Representatives of the SEPR later joined, and the faction became known as "Rodina (People's Will – SEPR)". In December 2006, the Gennady Semigin's Patriots of Russia party also joined the faction, after which it was renamed "People's Will – SEPR – Patriots of Russia." After supporters of the People's Will and SEPR left the faction in January 2007, it was renamed "Rodina – Patriots of Russia." In February 2007, the State Duma Committee on Rules and Organization of Work of the State Duma denied supporters of Baburin and SEPR leader Shestakov registration of their own faction.

In July 2005, after split of the Rodina State Duma faction, Baburin and the chairman of the SEPR party, Vasily Shestakov, announced their intention to hold a congress of the Rodina bloc. However, the agreement on the creation of the bloc, adopted in 2003, stipulates that representatives of all three parties that founded the bloc must participate in such a congress in order for it to be considered valid. By July 2005, the split within the Rodina bloc had reached its logical conclusion, with the formation of two factions of the same name, led by Rogozin and Baburin. The factions had 30 and 11 deputies, respectively. The State Duma Council denied Rogozin's Rodina the right to have its own deputy speaker, reserving the position for Baburin.

By the summer of 2005, Rogozin's Rodina party became ideologically radicalized, and was described by experts as "showing signs of National Socialist tendencies". Rogozin resigned in March 2006 and was replaced by Alexander Babakov, who adopted a more social democratic party rhetoric before eventually merging it into A Just Russia in October 2006. The Rodina party was re-established in 2012 by Rogozin and Aleksey Zhuravlyov.

Three factions with the word "Rodina" in their names, Rogozin-Babakov's "Rodina", Baburin's "Rodina (People’s Will – SEPR)" and Semigin's "Rodina – Patriots of Russia", existed during the term of the 4th State Duma.

== Ideology ==
The bloc was described as "left-patriotic", "national-patriotic", combining the socialist and nationalist ideas. Opinion polls in late 2003 and early 2004 identified the population groups that provided the bloc's highest support: the elderly, people with higher education, and residents of large cities. In the 2003 legislative election, the Rodina bloc attracted many voters who had not previously voted. Towards the end of its existence, Rogozin-led Rodina was described as nationalist and xenophobic by his ally Andrei Savelyev.

With the accession of People's Will and the radical nationalist parties affiliated with them in September 2003, the bloc, which had been formed as a left-wing, socially oriented one, began to acquire a strong nationalist tint, which caused an outflow of moderate-left parties such as the Russian Party of Labor and Union of People for Education and Science.

Novaya Gazeta journalist Anna Politkovskaya stated that Rodina was a chauvinistic organisation that had been "created by the Kremlin's spin doctors" for the 2003 election and the "aim was to draw moderately nationalist voters away from the more extreme National Bolsheviks". The Guardian claims that Rodina was "set up by President Vladimir Putin's allies" in 2003 "to leach votes from the Communist party".

== Controversies ==
From the very beginning, the bloc was commented on as being supported by the Presidential Administration and its leaders, Aleksandr Voloshin and Vladislav Surkov, who were interested in the emergence of a bloc that would take votes away from the Communist Party of the Russian Federation.

== Composition ==
The bloc was made up of the following parties, among others:

Party	Ideology	Political position	Leader(s)	Commentary
Rodina; Родина	Russian nationalism National conservatism	Syncretic (until 2004); Far-right (since 2004-5)	Yury Skokov; Sergey Glazyev; Dmitry Rogozin	Renamed from Party of Russian Regions in February 2004
Party of National Revival "People's Will"; Партия национального возрождения «Народная Воля»	Russian nationalism National conservatism Social conservatism	Right-wing to far-right	Sergei Baburin	Left in June 2005
Socialist United Party of Russia; Социалистическая единая партия России	Socialism; Social conservatism Christian left	Centre-left to left-wing	Vasily Shestakov; Yelena Mukhina	left in October 2004
Congress of Russian Communities; Конгресс русских общин	Russian nationalism	Right-wing to far-right	Sergey Glazyev, then Dmitry Rogozin	
Russian Party of Labour; Российская партия труда	Socialism; Trade union politics	Centre-left	Oleg Shein	left in Autumn 2003
Union of People for Education and Science; Союз людей за образование и науку	Social liberalism	Centre to centre-left	Vyacheslav Igrunov	left in September 2003
Eurasia Party; Партия Евразия	Fourth Political Theory; Eurasianism	Far-right	Alexander Dugin	left in September 2003
For a Holy Russia; За Русь святую	Conservatism; Christian nationalism	Right-wing	Sergei Popov	left in Autumn 2003
Russian Traditionalist Party; Российская традиционалистская партия			Alexander Chuev	
Russian Political Party "Creation"; Российская политическая партия "Созидание"			Vladimir Rabeyev	

== Electoral results ==
=== Presidential ===
Election	Candidate	First round		Second round		Result
Election	Candidate	Votes	%	Votes	%	Result
2004	Endorsed Vladimir Putin (Rodina and SEPR)	49,563,020	71.91%	—N/a		Won
2004	Sergey Glazyev (self-nominated, People's Will)	2,850,330	4.14%	—N/a		Lost

=== State Duma ===
Election	List lleader	Performance					Rank	Government
Election	List lleader	Votes	%	± pp	Seats	+/–	Rank	Government
2003	Sergey Glazyev	5,470,429	9.17	New	37 / 450	New	3rd	Opposition
