= Spiritual Heritage =

Spiritual Heritage Духовное наследие
- Leader: Alexey Podberezkin
- Founded: 27 May 1995
- Dissolved: 2 March 2002
- Succeeded by: United Socialist Party; Party of Social Justice
- Headquarters: 16th Building, Bakhrushina Street, Moscow, Russia. 113054
- Ideology: Russian nationalism Imperial nationalism Patriotism; Statism
- National affiliation: People's Patriotic Union of Russia
- Colours: Blue; Red
- Slogan: "Science, culture, education, healthcare and entrepreneurship" (Russian: "Наука, культура, образование, здравоохранение и предпринимательство")

The All-Russian Social-Political Movement “Spiritual Heritage” (Russian: Всероссийское общественно-политическое движение "Духовное наследие"; Vserossiyskoye obshchestvenno-politicheskoye dvizheniye "Dukhovnoye naslediye") also known as Spiritual Heritage or Spiritual Legacy (Russian: Духовное наследие; Dukhovnoye naslediye) was a nationalist political party in Russia. Its orientation has been characterized as moderately “national-imperial” (as opposed to ethnic nationalist) or as a “national-religious revision of communism”.

The movement was founded in 1995 by Alexey Podberezkin, the president of the RAU Corporation and worked in symbiosis with the Communist Party of the Russian Federation until autumn 1998: members of the Spiritual Heritage movements participated in the 1995 State Duma election within the CPRF list, and Gennady Zyuganov on the other hand belonged to the leadership of the Spiritual Heritage (and according to some sources, was strongly influenced by Podberyozkin's political philosophy). The movement was one of the initiators and members of the pro-communist umbrella organization People's Patriotic Union of Russia that gathered supporters of G. Zyuganov's presidential bid. The Spiritual Heritage movement eventually decided to participate independently in the 1999 State Duma election (Podberyozkin also considered running in the Fatherland list, for which reason he was expelled from the CPRF State Duma faction).

The ideology of the Spiritual Heritage movement can be characterized as statist, supporting a resurrection of the traditionally strong Russian state and favouring for this reason the rallying of nationalist forces around the CPRF as the main vehicle for statist ideology.

Since 1998, close relations between the movement and the Communist Party started to wane; Alexey Podberyozkin ran independently at the 2000 Russian presidential election. In 2003, members of the Spiritual Heritage founded the United Socialist Party of Russia.
