= Podberyozkin =

Podberyozkin or Podberezkin (Russian: Подберёзкин) is a Russian masculine surname, its feminine counterpart is Podberyozkina or Podberezkina. It may refer to

- Alexey Podberezkin (born 1953), Russian politician
- Vyacheslav Podberyozkin (born 1992), Russian football player
