= People's Republican Party of Russia =

Political party in Russia, 1996–2007

People's Republican Party of Russia Народно-республиканская партия России
- Founder: Alexander Lebed
- Registered: 27 December 1996
- Dissolved: 13 February 2007
- Ideology: Populism

Website
- nrpr.org

The People's Republican Party of Russia (NRPR, Russian: Народно-республиканская партия России (НРПР)) was a Russian political party.

== History ==
The party was officially registered on 27 December 1996 by Alexander Lebed following his strong performance in the 1996 Russian presidential election. Lebed announced his intention for the NRPR to take part in upcoming elections. In 1999, polls showed the party to be supported by 4-5% of voters. Despite successes in regional elections in 1996–98, the party declined following the election of Lebed as governor of Krasnoyarsk Krai, and was not able to register for the 1999 legislative election. The party ultimately declined following Lebed's death in 2002.

In late 2002, the party was re-registered legally as the Political Party "People's Republican Party of Russia" (Russian: Политическая Партия "Народно-Республиканская Партия России"), and on 13 February 2007 it was dissolved by the Supreme Court of Russia.

== Ideology ==
The NPRP was oriented around the popularity of Alexander Lebed and was a populist party. Lebed claimed the party represented a "third way" between the Communist Party and the pro-Yeltsin parties.

== Election results ==
=== State Duma ===
Election	Leader	Votes	%	Rank	Seats
1999	Alexander Lebed	Did not participate			0 / 450
2003	Eduard Baltin	80,420	0.13	23rd	0 / 450
