= Mother Homeland =

Mother Homeland may refer to:

- Mother Motherland (disambiguation), monuments in Russia and Ukraine
- Mutter Heimat, a monument in Treptower Park, Germany
