= SEPR =

SEPR may refer to:

- Société d'Etudes pour la Propulsion par Réaction, French rocket-engine manufacturer
- Sepracor Sepracor, Inc. ( former NASDAQ: SEPR ), pharmaceutical company
- United Socialist Party of Russia, Russian political party (abbreviation of Russian name)
- Evangelical Seminary of Puerto Rico, Protestant seminary in Puerto Rico (abbreviation of Spanish name)
