= Union of People for Education and Science =

Union of People for Education and Science Союз людей за образование и науку
- Abbreviation: SLON (English); СЛОН (Russian)
- Leader: Vyacheslav Igrunov
- Founded: November 16, 2002
- Dissolved: April 16, 2007
- Split from: Yabloko
- Headquarters: 41st Building, 9th Parkovaya Street, Moscow, Russia
- Ideology: Social liberalism Support of science and education
- Political position: Centre to centre-left
- National affiliation: Rodina (2003)
- Colours: Purple; Periwinkle

Website
- slon-party.ru

The Union of People for Education and Science (SLON; Russian: Союз людей за образование и науку, партия СЛОН, romanized: Soyuz lyudey za obrazovaniye i nauku, Partiya SLON, lit. 'Elephant Party') was a social-liberal political party that existed in Russia from 2002 to 2007.

The party was formed by a group of politicians who left Yabloko, led by Vyacheslav Vladimirovich Igrunov. Their political priorities included social protection, general liberal values, and support for science and education. The party received 0.17% of the vote in the 2003 Russian legislative election. On October 30, 2004, the party joined a coalition with the Patriotic Party of Russia. On March 21, 2005, the party signed an agreement with the Russian Party of Life. On August 8, 2006, the Federal Service for State Registration, Cadastre and Cartography ruled that the party lacks the legally required number of members, and it was dissolved in February 2007.

== History ==
On 20 February 2003, the party held a protest against an upcoming education reform and the government's proposed reduction in spending on science. SLON called on the Russian authorities to abandon their policy of austerity towards education and science.

In 2003, Vladimir Shakhtin, a member of the Central Council of the party and a prominent opposition figure in the Komi Republic, was elected head of the Inta Urban Okrug. In the elections to the regional Duma of the Sverdlovsk Oblast, the SLON bloc received first place. In 2006, a criminal case was opened against Shakhtin for failure to comply with the decision of the Arbitration Court of the Republic to accept residential buildings on the city's balance sheet, as a result of which he was removed from the post of head of the city. In 2007, the case against Shakhtin was dropped due to his repentance. Vladimir Shakhtin himself linked his resignation to his party affiliation and refusal to cooperate with United Russia:

I am a representative of SLON, the Union of People for Education and Science. This party is slowly dying, because it is a party that does not take money from business; that is, we are not for sale. That is why elephants do not survive in Russia, and mammoths have long since become extinct.
