= People's Union (Russia) =

People's Union Народный союз Narodnyy Soyuz
- Leader: Sergey Baburin
- Founded: 22 December 2001; 24 years ago (as People's Will) 24 March 2007; 19 years ago (as People's Union)
- Dissolved: 13 December 2008; 17 years ago
- Split from: Russian All-People's Union; Russian Renewal; Spas; Union of Realists
- Merged into: Russian All-People's Union
- Headquarters: 11th building, Trokhgornyy pereulok, Moscow, Russia
- Newspaper: Russian Herald
- Membership (2007): 82,000
- Ideology: National conservatism Russian nationalism Social conservatism
- Political position: Far-right
- National affiliation: Rodina (2003–2005)
- Colours: Black; Gold; White; Dark red Before 2007; Red; Blue
- Slogan: "For Russian Russia!" (Russian: "За русскую Россию!")

Party flag

Website
- partia-nv.ru

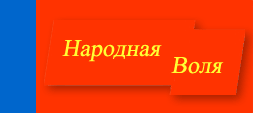
Logo of the People's Will until 2007

The People's Union (Russian: Народный Союз, romanized: Narodnyy Soyuz), formerly known as the Party of National Revival "People's Will" (Russian: Партия Национального Возрождения «Народная Воля», romanized: Partiya Natsional'nogo Vozrozhdeniya «Narodnaya Volya»), was a Russian nationalist political party founded in December 2001. It was led by veteran Russian nationalist politician Sergey Baburin. In December 2008, it finished its existence as a political party and was reorganized into the Russian All-People's Union.

The Party of National Revival was created by uniting four minor Russian nationalist parties who merged, and its name Narodnaya Volya translates from Russian as People's Will. In September 2003, Narodnaya Volya joined Rodina and performed surprisingly well in the 2003 Russian legislative election. Narodnaya Volya was seen by many as the most nationalist and conservative element in a then-mostly leftist Rodina, and a number of its members in the past were associated with Russian far-right movements. Nine members of Narodnaya Volya were deputies of the Russian Duma. In October 2006, Narodnaya Volya, unlike most of Rodina, did not join the A Just Russia party, and remained an independent faction in the Duma.

Narodnaya Volya stated to have international ties with the People's Opposition Bloc of Natalia Vitrenko led by Nataliya Vitrenko, the National Front led by Jean-Marie Le Pen, and the Serbian Radical Party of Vojislav Šešelj. Prominent Narodnaya Volya party members include Viktors Alksnis, Nikolai Leonov, and Aleksandr Rutskoy. In November 2006, the party gained prominence as one of the main organizers of the nationalist Russian Marsh during the Unity Day celebrations in Moscow.

On 26 March 2007, Narodnaya Volya united with 13 small nationalist, Orthodox Christian, and conservative organizations and party was renamed the People's Union. The new party declared its intention to participate in 2007 Russian legislative election. Among more prominent politicians who united under the leadership of Baburin was Anna Markova, former vice governor of Saint Petersburg. The party was not able to take part in the 2007 legislative election, and decided to endorse the Communist Party of Russian Federation.

== Parliamentary elections ==
State Duma
Election year	No. of overall votes	% of overall vote	No. of overall seats won	+/–	Leader	Note
2007	8,046,886 (2nd)	11.6	57 / 450	▲5	Gennady Zyuganov	Endorsed the Communist Party of Russian Federation.

== See also ==
- List of political parties in Russia
- Russian All-People's Union (1991–2001, 2008–)
