= Party of Social Justice =

Party of Social Justice Партия социальной справедливости
- Abbreviation: PSJ (English); ПСС (Russian)
- Leader: Alexey Podberezkin
- Founded: 22 October 2002
- Dissolved: 17 September 2008
- Merged into: A Just Russia
- Headquarters: Moscow, Russia
- Ideology: Democratic socialism
- Political position: Center-left
- National affiliation: People's Patriotic Union of Russia
- Colours: White; Blue; Red; Light green
- Slogan: "European prices - European salaries!" (Russian: " Европейским ценам — европейские зарплаты!")

Website
- www.pp-pss.ru

The Party of Social Justice (Партия социальной справедливости, Partiya Sotsial'noy Spravedlivosti) was a political party in Russia.

At the 2003 legislative elections, the alliance of the Russian Pensioners' Party and the Social Justice Party won 3.1% of the popular vote and no seats.

On the 2007 Russian legislative election the party won 0.22% of votes, not breaking the 7% barrier, and thus no seats in Duma.

It merged into Just Russia in 2008.

== Electoral results ==
=== Presidential elections ===
Election	Candidate	First round		Second round		Result
Election	Candidate	Votes	%	Votes	%	Result
2004	Endorsed Vladimir Putin	49,565,238	71.31%			Elected ✓
2008	Endorsed Dmitry Medvedev	52,530,712	70.28%			Elected ✓

=== Legislative elections ===
Election	Party leader	Performance					Rank	Government
Election	Party leader	Votes	%	± pp	Seats	+/–	Rank	Government
2003	Vladimir Kishenin	1,874,973	3.09% (RPP-PSS)	New	1 / 450	New	8th	Minority
2007	Alexey Podberezkin	154,083	0.22%	▼2.87	0 / 450	▼1	▼10th	Extra-parliamentary
