= 2003 Russian legislative election =

- 7 December 2003

All 450 seats in the State Duma 226 seats needed for a majority
- Turnout: 55.75% (▼6.10 pp)
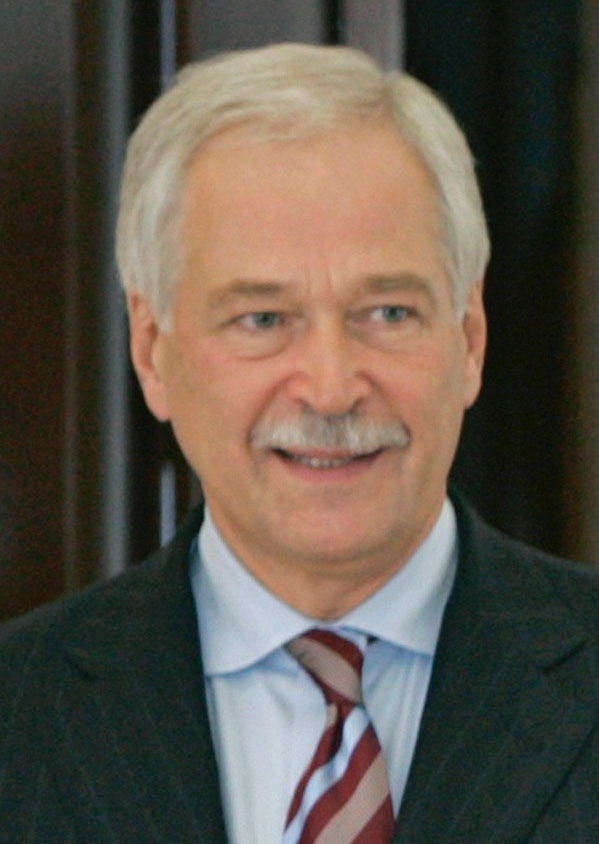

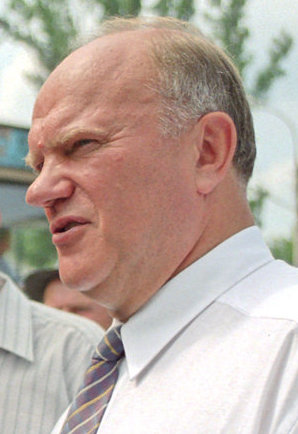

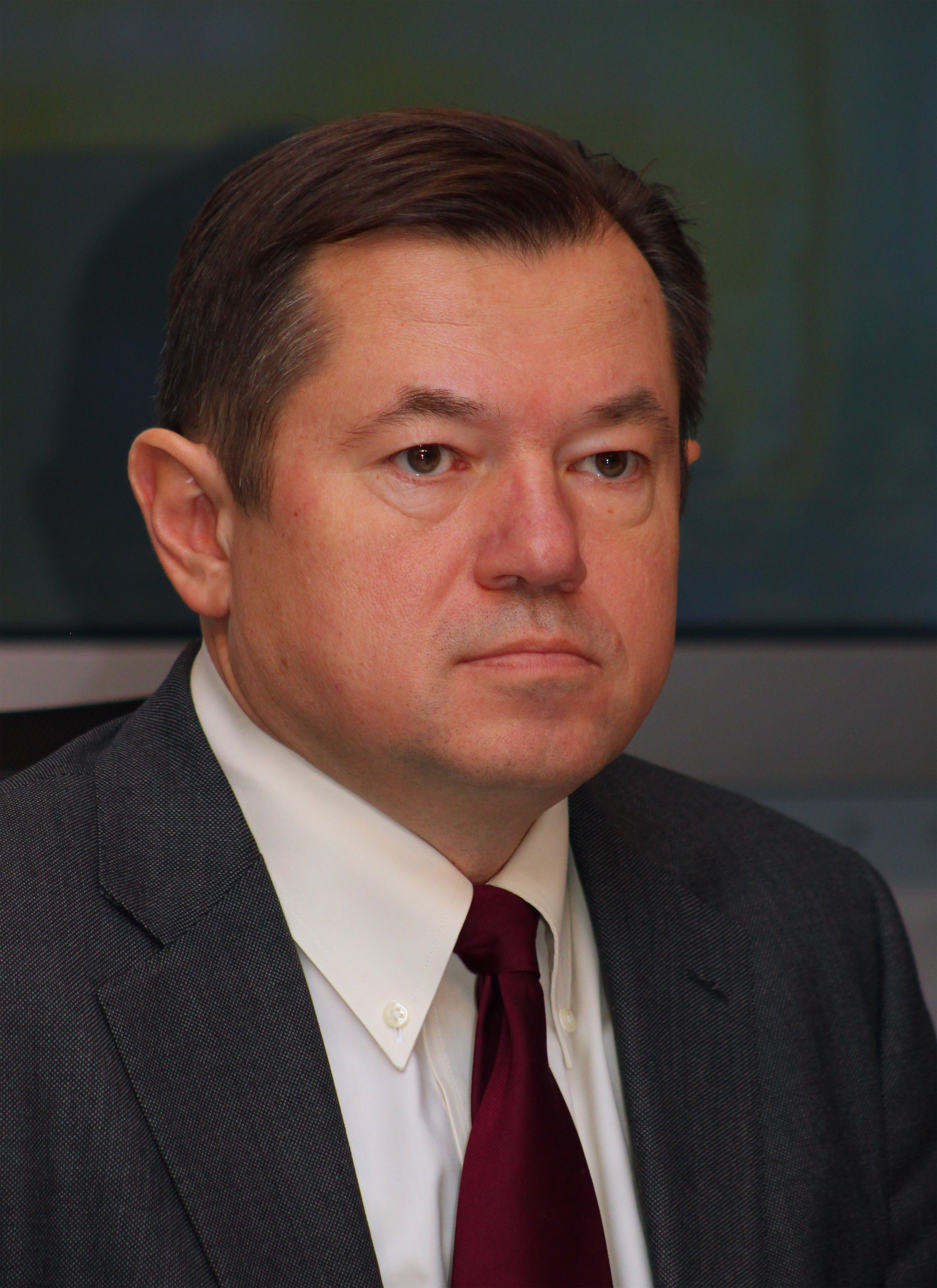

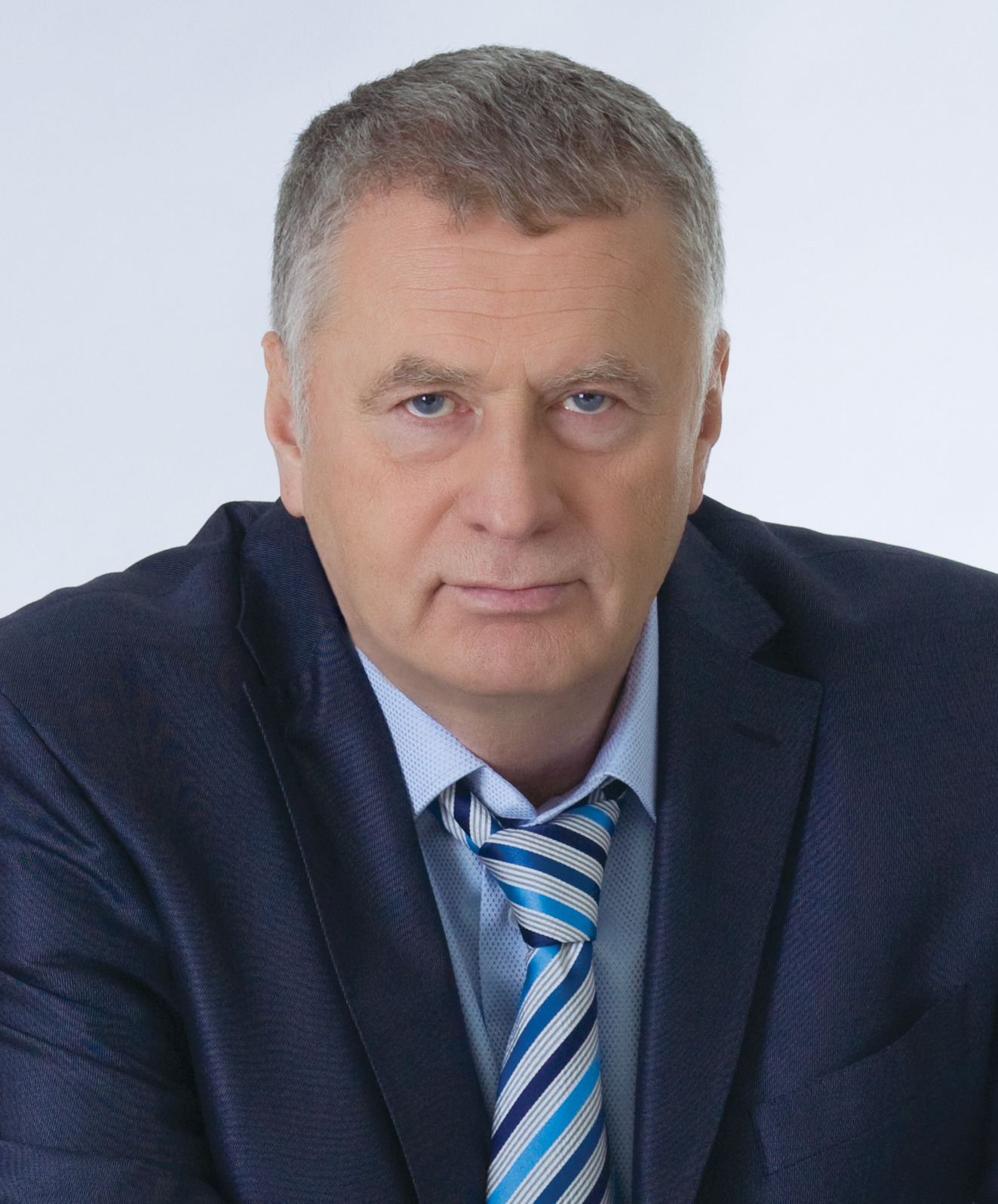

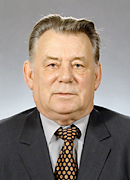

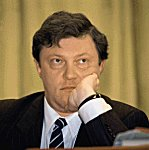

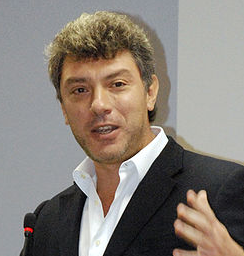

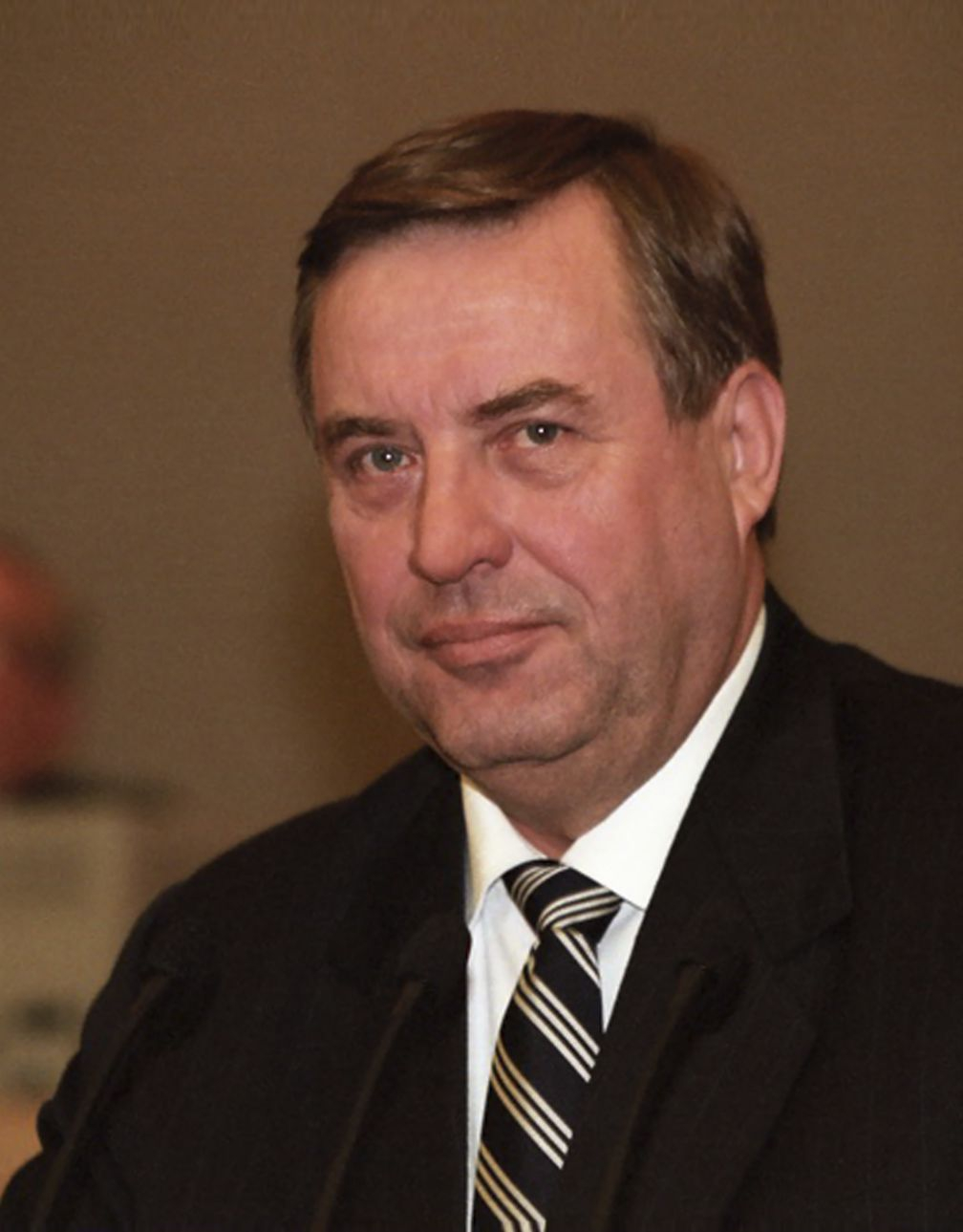

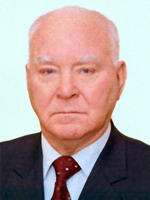
| | First party | Second party | Third party |
|---|---|---|---|
| Leader | Boris Gryzlov | Gennady Zyuganov | Sergey Glazyev |
| Party | United Russia | CPRF | Rodina |
| Leader since | 20 November 2002 | 14 February 1993 | 14 September 2003 |
| Leader's seat | Federal list | Federal list | Podolsk |
| Last election | New | 113 seats, 24.29% | New |
| Seats won | 223 | 52 | 37 |
| Seat change | New | ▼61 | New |
| Popular vote | 22,776,294 | 7,647,820 | 5,470,429 |
| Percentage | 37.56% (PL) | 12.61% (PL) | 9.02% (PL) |
| Swing | New | ▼11.68% | New |
| | Fourth party | Fifth party | Sixth party |
| Leader | Vladimir Zhirinovsky | Gennady Raikov | Grigory Yavlinsky |
| Party | LDPR | NPRF | Yabloko |
| Leader since | 13 December 1989 | 29 September 2001 | 16 October 1993 |
| Leader's seat | Federal list | Tyumen | Federal list (lost) |
| Last election | 17 seats, 5.20% | New | 20 seats, 5.93% |
| Seats won | 36 | 17 | 4 |
| Seat change | ▲19 | New | ▼16 |
| Popular vote | 6,944,322 | 714,705 | 2,610,087 |
| Percentage | 11.35% (PL) | 1.18% (PL) | 4.30% (PL) |
| Swing | ▲6.15% | New | ▼1.63% |
| | Seventh party | Eighth party | Ninth party |
| Leader | Boris Nemtsov | Gennadiy Seleznyov | Mikhail Lapshin |
| Party | SPS | PVR–RPZh | APR |
| Leader since | 27 May 2001 | 7 September 2002 | 26 February 1993 |
| Leader's seat | Avtozavodsky (Note: Did not stand for re-election.) / Federal list (lost) | Northern SPb | Federal list (lost) |
| Last election | 29 seats, 8.52% | New | 11 seats (inside OVR) |
| Seats won | 3 | 3 | 2 |
| Seat change | ▼26 | New | ▼9 |
| Popular vote | 2,408,535 | 1,140,413 | 2,205,850 |
| Percentage | 3.97% (PL) | 1.88% (PL) | 3.64% (PL) |
| Swing | ▼4.55% | New | – |
Chairman of the State Duma before election
Gennadiy Seleznyov
PVR
Elected Chairman of the State Duma
Boris Gryzlov
United Russia

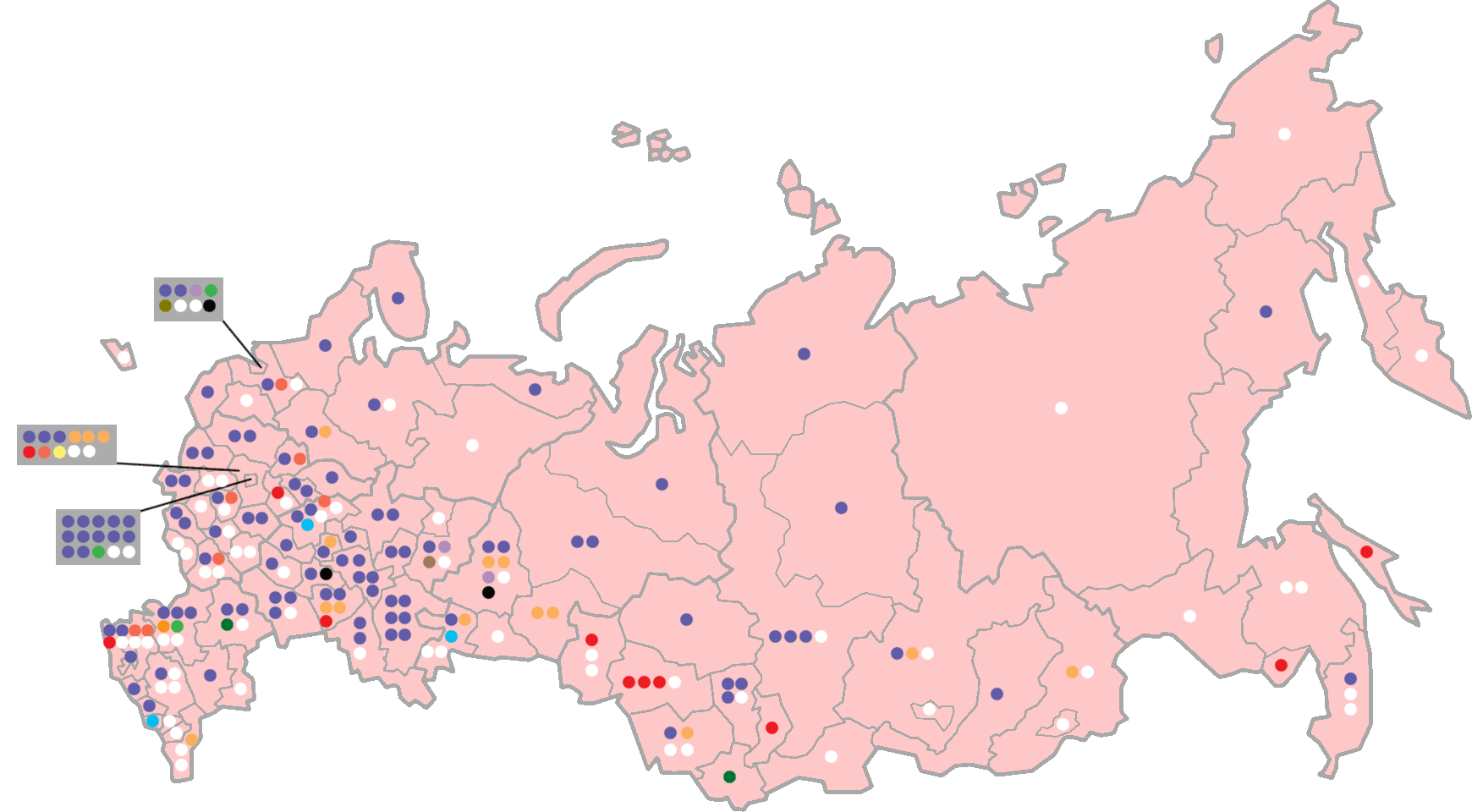
Distribution of the constituency seats by federal subject. List: United Russia People's Party Communist Party Rodina Yabloko Party of Rebirth/Party of Life Union of Right Forces Agrarian Party Great Russia New Course — Automobile Russia Development of Enterprise Self-nominations Seat not filled

Legislative elections were held in Russia on 7 December 2003. At stake were the 450 seats in the State Duma (Gosudarstvennaya Duma), the lower house of the Federal Assembly.

As expected, the pro-Vladimir Putin United Russia party received the most votes (38%) and won the most seats, gaining a plurality in the Duma. The Communist Party remained the second largest, though much reduced in strength. The Liberal Democratic Party improved its position by 19 seats, while the liberal Yabloko and the liberal-conservative Union of Right Forces lost most of their seats.

== Political parties and blocs ==
| No. | Party or bloc | Abbr. | Lead candidates | Political position | Ideology |
|---|---|---|---|---|---|
| 1 | Conceptual Party "Unity" | KPE | Konstantin Petrov • Vladimir Gribov • Dmitry Poltoratsky | Far-right | Conspiracy theory / Occultism |
| 2 | Union of Right Forces | SPS | Boris Nemtsov • Irina Khakamada • Anatoly Chubais | Centre-right to right-wing | Conservative liberalism / Neoliberalism / Atlanticism |
| 3 | Russian Party of Pensioners and Party of Social Justice; RPP, PSS | RPP–PSS | Vladimir Kishenin • Galiya Zelenchukova • Dmitry Senyukov | Centre-left | Pensioners' interests / Social justice |
| 4 | Russian United Democratic Party "Yabloko" | Yabloko | Grigory Yavlinsky • Vladimir Lukin • Igor Artemyev | Centre | Social liberalism / Liberal democracy |
| 5 | For a Holy Russia | ZRS | Sergey Popov • Aleksey Kuimov • Igor Shatalov | Right-wing | Conservatism / Christian nationalism |
| 6 | United Russian Party Rus' (Note: Russian Stability Party before 2003.) | ORP Rus' | Valery Burkov • Lidia Rusanova • Vladimir Medvedev | Right-wing | Patriotism / Russian nationalism |
| 7 | New Course — Automobile Russia; Liberal Russia, RPRF, DAR | NCAR | Viktor Pokhmelkin • Boris Fyodorov • Leonid Olshansky | Centre-right | Liberalism / Drivers' interests |
| 8 | People's Republican Party of Russia | NRPR | Eduard Baltin • Vladimir Kushnerenko • Vitaly Pavlov | Right-wing | National conservatism / Patriotism / Military interests |
| 9 | Russian Ecological Party "The Greens" | REPZ | Anatoly Panfilov • Viktor Ignatov • Vladimir Yevstafyev | Centre | Green politics |
| 10 | Agrarian Party of Russia | APR | Mikhail Lapshin • Aleksandr Nazarchuk • Alexey Chepa | Left-wing | Agrarianism / Agrarian socialism |
| 11 | Genuine Patriots of Russia (Note: Islamic Party of Russia before 2003.) | IPR | Magomed Radzhabov • Kalsyn Tokayev • Zaur Radzhabov | Centre-right | Muslim interests |
| 12 | People's Party of the Russian Federation | NPRF | Gennady Raikov • Gennady Troshev • Nikolay Derzhavin | Centre-left | Populism / Social conservatism |
| 13 | Democratic Party of Russia | DPR | Vladimir Podoprigora • Mikhail Kislyuk • Gennady Pushko | Centre-right | Liberal conservatism / Federalism / Civic nationalism |
| 14 | Great Russia–Eurasian Union; EAP–SPR, RPM, GPR | VR–EAS | Pavel Borodin • Ruslan Aushev • Leonid Ivashov | Centre-left | Eurasian integration / Left-wing populism |
| 15 | Union of People for Education and Science | SLON | Vyacheslav Igrunov • Nurali Latypov • Andrey Sharomov | Centre to centre-left | Social liberalism / Scientists' interests |
| 16 | Rodina (People's Patriotic Union); SEPR, People's Will, PRR | Rodina | Sergey Glazyev • Dmitry Rogozin • Valentin Varennikov | Syncretic | Russian nationalism / Social conservatism / Statism |
| 17 | Party of Peace and Unity | PME | Sazhi Umalatova • Viktor Stepanov • Yevgeny Ishchenko | Left-wing | Soviet patriotism / Eurasianism |
| 18 | Liberal Democratic Party of Russia | LDPR | Vladimir Zhirinovsky • Alexey Ostrovsky • Igor Lebedev | Right-wing | Right-wing populism / Unitarism / Anti-communism |
| 19 | Party of Russia's Rebirth – Russian Party of Life; PVR, RPZh | PVR–RPZh | Gennadiy Seleznyov • Sergey Mironov • Valentina Tereshkova | Centre-left | Left-wing populism / Welfare state / Social democracy |
| 20 | United Russia | UR | Boris Gryzlov • Sergei Shoigu • Yury Luzhkov | Centre-right | Statism / Social conservatism / Conservative liberalism |
| 21 | Russian Constitutional Democratic Party | RKDP | Vyacheslav Volkov • Irina Alfyorova • Aleksandr Kotenev | Centre-right | Constitutionalism |
| 22 | Development of Enterprise | RP | Ivan Grachev • Oksana Dmitriyeva • Andrey Nechayev | Centre-right | Economic liberalism |
| 23 | Communist Party of the Russian Federation | CPRF | Gennady Zyuganov • Nikolai Kondratenko • Nikolay Kharitonov | Left-wing | Socialism / Left-wing conservatism |

=== Not on ballot ===
| Party | Abbr. | Lead candidates | Political position | Ideology |
|---|---|---|---|---|
| All-National Russian Political Party "Union" | ORPP Soyuz | Aleksandr Kudimov • Dmitry Kaplin • Mikhail Trofimov | Centre | Protectionism / Welfare state |
| All-National Russian Political Party "Union" | ORPP Soyuz | The party did not file paperwork for election. | | |
| Conservative Party of Russia | KPR | Yuriy Tegin • Vladimir Burenin • Natalya Korolyova | Centre-right | Conservatism / Anti-communism |
| Conservative Party of Russia | KPR | The party did not file paperwork for election after a leadership split in October 2003. | | |
| Liberal Russia (pro-Berezovsky faction) | LR | Boris Berezovsky • Ivan Rybkin • Yuly Dubov | Centre-right | Liberalism / Liberal conservatism |
| Liberal Russia (pro-Berezovsky faction) | LR | Federal list of candidates was rejected by the Central Election Commission following a split in party leadership. The commission sided with the anti-Berezovsky faction of Liberal Russia which ran in this election as part of the New Course — Automobile Russia alliance. | | |
| National Patriotic Forces of the Russian Federation | NPS RF | Andrey Saltsinov • Schmidt Dzoblayev • Stanislav Terekhov | Left-wing | Left-wing populism / Multiculturalism / Federalism |
| National Patriotic Forces of the Russian Federation | NPS RF | Federal list of candidates was withdrawn by the party citing concerns about quality of signatures gathered in their support. NPS RF candidates remained on ballot in single-member constituencies. | | |

The following parties only competed in single-member constituencies:

- People's Patriotic Party of Russia
- Russian Communist Workers Party–Russian Party of Communists
- Russian United Industrial Party
- Russian Party of Labour
- Russian Political Party "Creation"
- Social Democratic Party of Russia.

== Opinion polls ==
| Polling firm | Fieldwork date | Unity | OVR | CPRF | LDPR | Rodina | Yabloko | SPS | APR | Other | Unsure | Against all | Wouldn't vote | Lead |
| Polling firm | Fieldwork date | United Russia | | CPRF | LDPR | Rodina | Yabloko | SPS | APR | Other | Unsure | Against all | Wouldn't vote | Lead |
|---|---|---|---|---|---|---|---|---|---|---|---|---|---|---|
| Election result | 19 Dec 1999 | 23.3 | 13.3 | 24.3 | 5.9 | —N/a | 6.0 | 8.5 | —N/a | 13.4 | —N/a | 3.3 | —N/a | 1 |
| | 26 Mar 2000 | 2000 Russian presidential election | | | | | | | | | | | | |
| | 1 May 2000 | End of the active phase of Second Chechen War, effective Russian victory | | | | | | | | | | | | |
| VCIOM | May 2000 | 26 | 6 | 33 | 4 | —N/a | 8 | 9 | 1 | 9 (Note: Women of Russia 4%, NRPR 2%, NDR, RNE 1%, other 1%.) | —N/a | 4 | —N/a | 7 |
| VCIOM | 24–27 Nov 2000 | 19 | 6 | 33 | 7 | —N/a | 8 | 8 | 2 | 12 (Note: Women of Russia 7%, Russia 2%, NRPR, RNE 1%, other 1%.) | —N/a | 4 | —N/a | 14 |
| FOM | 2–3 Dec 2000 | 16 | 3 | 17 | 3 | —N/a | 5 | 5 | —N/a | —N/a | 27 | 5 | 12 | 1 |
| FOM | 10–11 Feb 2001 | 19 | 7 | 21 | 5 | —N/a | 5 | 3 | 3 | —N/a | 20 | 8 | 8 | 2 |
| | Apr 2001 | "Save NTV" protests | | | | | | | | | | | | |
| FOM | 14–15 Apr 2001 | 19 | 5 | 22 | 6 | —N/a | 5 | 4 | 2 | —N/a | 14 | 8 | 15 | 3 |
| FOM | 21–22 Apr 2001 | 22 | 8 | 21 | 4 | —N/a | 8 | 5 | 3 | —N/a | 13 | 7 | 8 | 1 |
| FOM | 2–3 Jun 2001 | 23 | 5 | 23 | 5 | —N/a | 5 | 5 | 3 | —N/a | 16 | 6 | 11 | Tie |
| FOM | 14–15 Jul 2001 | 22 | 6 | 23 | 5 | —N/a | 4 | 4 | 2 | —N/a | 18 | 7 | 9 | 1 |
| FOM | 8–9 Sep 2001 | 22 | 6 | 23 | 4 | —N/a | 5 | 3 | 2 | —N/a | 20 | 6 | 9 | 1 |
| FOM | 20–21 Oct 2001 | 25 | 6 | 22 | 5 | —N/a | 4 | 3 | 2 | —N/a | 18 | 6 | 10 | 3 |
| | 1 Dec 2001 | United Russia party founded | | | | | | | | | | | | |
| FOM | 2–3 Feb 2002 | 21 | | 24 | 7 | —N/a | 6 | 4 | 3 | —N/a | 14 | 10 | 10 | 3 |
| FOM | 20 Jul 2002 | 31 | | 22 | 5 | —N/a | 3 | 3 | 2 | —N/a | —N/a | —N/a | —N/a | 9 |
| VCIOM | 21–27 Aug 2002 | 26 | | 34 | 9 | —N/a | 8 | 6 | 1 | 12 (Note: Women of Russia 6%, DPR, RNE, Russia 1%, other 3%.) | —N/a | 5 | —N/a | 8 |
| FOM | 12–13 Oct 2002 | 26 | | 23 | 5 | —N/a | 5 | 5 | 2 | 1 | 15 | 6 | 10 | 3 |
| | 23–26 Oct 2002 | Nord-Ost Hostage Crisis | | | | | | | | | | | | |
| ARPI | 5–9 Dec 2002 | 37 | | 24 | 8 | —N/a | 8 | 8 | —N/a | 8 | —N/a | 7 | —N/a | 13 |
| ARPI | 5–9 Dec 2002 | 29 | | 13 | 4 | —N/a | 5 | 5 | 2 | 12 | 16 | 9 | 7 | 16 |
| VCIOM | 20–23 Dec 2002 | 27 | | 27 | 9 | —N/a | 7 | 5 | 2 | 20 (Note: Women of Russia 8%, PVR 3%, RNE, RPP, Development of Enterprise 2%, NPRF, Liberal Russia 1%, other 1%.) | —N/a | 5 | —N/a | Tie |
| ARPI | 6–10 Feb 2003 | 30 | | 29 | 9 | —N/a | 8 | 6 | —N/a | 8 | —N/a | 10 | —N/a | 1 |
| ARPI | 6–10 Feb 2003 | 21 | | 18 | 5 | —N/a | 4 | 4 | 5 | 15 | 14 | 10 | 9 | 3 |
| ARPI | 21–25 Feb 2003 | 34 | | 29 | 7 | —N/a | 8 | 5 | —N/a | 9 | —N/a | 8 | —N/a | 5 |
| ARPI | 21–25 Feb 2003 | 20 | | 16 | 4 | —N/a | 5 | 4 | 2 | 12 | 20 | 10 | 9 | 4 |
| ARPI | 6–11 Mar 2003 | 32 | | 32 | 8 | —N/a | 8 | 6 | —N/a | 6 | —N/a | 8 | —N/a | Tie |
| ARPI | 6–11 Mar 2003 | 20 | | 19 | 4 | —N/a | 5 | 4 | 2 | 9 | 16 | 11 | 12 | 1 |
| ARPI | 20–24 Mar 2003 | 31 | | 36 | 10 | —N/a | 6 | 3 | —N/a | 6 | —N/a | 8 | —N/a | 5 |
| ARPI | 20–24 Mar 2003 | 21 | | 23 | 4 | —N/a | 4 | 3 | 4 | 6 | 16 | 10 | 9 | 2 |
| FOM | 5–6 Apr 2003 | 21 | | 22 | 5 | —N/a | 5 | 3 | 3 | 1 | 25 | 5 | 11 | 1 |
| ARPI | 3–9 Apr 2003 | 35 | | 34 | 7 | —N/a | 8 | 4 | —N/a | 7 | —N/a | 5 | —N/a | 1 |
| ARPI | 3–9 Apr 2003 | 23 | | 18 | 3 | —N/a | 3 | 2 | 1 | 8 | 19 | 8 | 15 | 5 |
| FOM | 17 May 2003 | 19 | | 21 | 7 | —N/a | 5 | 3 | —N/a | —N/a | —N/a | —N/a | —N/a | 2 |
| VCIOM | 23–26 May 2003 | 23 | | 28 | 10 | —N/a | 8 | 5 | —N/a | 7 | 13 | 4 | —N/a | 5 |
| ARPI | 27 May 2003 | 22 | | 23 | 5 | —N/a | 4 | 5 | —N/a | 1 | 37 | 3 | —N/a | 1 |
| VCIOM | 20–24 Jun 2003 | 26 | | 27 | 6 | —N/a | 8 | 3 | 1 | 10 (Note: PVR, Greens 2%, NPRF, RPP, DPR, RNE, SDPR 1%, other 1%.) | 16 | 3 | —N/a | 1 |
| VCIOM | 15–18 Aug 2003 | 23 | | 28 | 9 | —N/a | 6 | 5 | 4 | 6 (Note: PVR 3%, Greens, NPRF, RPP 1%, other <1%.) | 12 | 5 | —N/a | 5 |
| CSP | 2–10 Sep 2003 | 26.8 | | 17.0 | 7.0 | —N/a | 5.7 | 5.6 | —N/a | 5.6 (Note: RPZh 3.1%, PVR 2.5%.) | —N/a | —N/a | —N/a | 9.8 |
| VCIOM-A | 19–22 Sep 2003 | 28 | | 23 | 5 | 2 | 5 | 5 | 2 | 6 (Note: Greens 2%, NPRF, PVR-RPZh, DPR 1%, other 1%.) | 20 | 5 | —N/a | 5 |
| FOM | 11 Oct 2003 | 20 | | 18 | 7 | 2 | 4 | 4 | 2 | 4 (Note: PVR-RPZh 2%, NPRF, Great Russia—Eurasian Union 1%, New Course 0%.) | 21 | 5 | 13 | 2 |
| VCIOM-A | 10–13 Oct 2003 | 26 | | 26 | 5 | 3 | 5 | 4 | 2 | 4 (Note: Greens, PVR-RPZh, DPR, NPRF 1%.) | 20 | 5 | —N/a | Tie |
| | 25 Oct 2003 | Arrest of Mikhail Khodorkovsky, Yukos affair | | | | | | | | | | | | |
| VCIOM-A | 24–28 Oct 2003 | 30 | | 23 | 5 | 1 | 4 | 6 | 2 | 5 (Note: RPP–PSS, Greens, VR–EAS, Development of Enterprise, NPRF 1%.) | 17 | 6 | —N/a | 7 |
| FOM | 8–9 Nov 2003 | 18.7 | | 16.3 | 5.1 | 1.2 | 4.2 | 4.5 | —N/a | 6.0 | 25.6 | 5.9 | 12.4 | 2.4 |
| VCIOM-A | 13–16 Nov 2003 | 29 | | 23 | 8 | 3 | 6 | 6 | 2 | 4 (Note: RPP–PSS 2%, NPRF, Development of Enterprise 1%.) | 14 | 5 | —N/a | 6 |
| FOM | 15–16 Nov 2003 | 19.5 | | 14.9 | 6.0 | 2.9 | 3.8 | 4.5 | —N/a | 6.2 | 24.1 | 5.7 | 12.2 | 4.6 |
| VCIOM | 15–16 Nov 2003 | 26.2 | | 19.6 | 5.3 | 4.1 | 5.4 | 5.5 | 1.5 | 6.6 (Note: RPP–PSS 1.9%, Greens 1.1%, NPRF 1%, KPE 0.8%, ZRS 0.4%, NRPR, PVR–RPZh 0.3%, Development of Enterprise, VR–EAS 0.2%, ORP Rus, NC–AR, DPR, SLON 0.1%) | 19.8 | 6.0 | —N/a | 6.6 |
| FOM | 22–23 Nov 2003 | 25.1 | | 14.1 | 6.5 | 3.3 | 2.5 | 3.5 | —N/a | 7.4 | 22.0 | 5.4 | 10.6 | 11 |
| ARPI | 27 Nov 2003 | 32 | | 9 | 5 | 2 | 4 | 7 | 2 | 7 (Note: RPP–PSS 3%, NPRF, ORP Rus, PVR–RPZh, KPE 1%.) | 11 | 5 | 16 | 23 |
| FOM | 29–30 Nov 2003 | 28.1 | | 15.8 | 7.3 | 4.4 | 2.7 | 3.4 | —N/a | 7.3 | 18.3 | 5.0 | 7.9 | 12.3 |

=== Seat projections ===
| Projector | Date | United Russia | CPRF | LDPR | Yabloko | SPS | Other |
|---|---|---|---|---|---|---|---|
| NAPP | 8 Oct 2003 | 185 | 135 | 21 | 21 | 22 | 66 |
| NAPP | 3 Nov 2003 | 173 | 108 | 21 | 25 | 20 | 103 |
| Election result | 7 Dec 2003 | 223 | 52 | 36 | 4 | 3 | 132 |

=== Exit polls ===
| Polling firm | United Russia | CPRF | LDPR | Rodina | Yabloko | SPS | Against all |
|---|---|---|---|---|---|---|---|
| FOM | 36 | 13.3 | 11.6 | 9.2 | 5.1 | 4.7 | —N/a |
| ROMIR | 34.1 | 13.2 | 10.9 | 9.5 | 5.8 | 6.1 | 6.8 |
| Election result | 37.6 | 12.6 | 11.5 | 9.0 | 4.3 | 4.0 | 4.7 |

== Results ==

| Party | Party-list | | | Constituency | | | Total seats | +/– |
| Party | Votes | % | Seats | Votes | % | Seats | Total seats | +/– |
|---|---|---|---|---|---|---|---|---|
| United Russia | 22,776,294 | 38.16 | 120 | 14,123,625 | 23.95 | 103 | 223 | New |
| Communist Party | 7,647,820 | 12.81 | 40 | 6,577,598 | 11.15 | 12 | 52 | −61 |
| Liberal Democratic Party | 6,944,322 | 11.64 | 36 | 1,860,905 | 3.16 | 0 | 36 | +19 |
| Rodina (People's Patriotic Union) | 5,470,429 | 9.17 | 29 | 1,719,147 | 2.92 | 8 | 37 | New |
| Yabloko | 2,610,087 | 4.37 | 0 | 1,580,629 | 2.68 | 4 | 4 | −16 |
| Union of Right Forces | 2,408,535 | 4.04 | 0 | 1,764,290 | 2.99 | 3 | 3 | −26 |
| Agrarian Party | 2,205,850 | 3.70 | 0 | 1,104,974 | 1.87 | 2 | 2 | New |
| Russian Pensioners' Party–Party of Social Justice | 1,874,973 | 3.14 | 0 | 342,891 | 0.58 | 0 | 0 | −1 |
| Party of Russia's Rebirth–Russian Party of Life | 1,140,413 | 1.91 | 0 | 1,584,904 | 2.69 | 3 | 3 | New |
| People's Party | 714,705 | 1.20 | 0 | 2,677,889 | 4.54 | 17 | 17 | New |
| Conceptual Party "Unity" | 710,721 | 1.19 | 0 | 9,334 | 0.02 | 0 | 0 | New |
| New Course — Automobile Russia | 509,302 | 0.85 | 0 | 222,090 | 0.38 | 1 | 1 | New |
| For a Holy Russia | 298,826 | 0.50 | 0 | 59,986 | 0.10 | 0 | 0 | New |
| Russian Ecological Party "The Greens" | 253,985 | 0.43 | 0 | 69,585 | 0.12 | 0 | 0 | 0 |
| Development of Enterprise | 212,827 | 0.36 | 0 | 237,527 | 0.40 | 1 | 1 | New |
| Great Russia – Eurasian Union | 170,796 | 0.29 | 0 | 464,602 | 0.79 | 1 | 1 | New |
| Genuine Patriots of Russia | 149,151 | 0.25 | 0 | 2,564 | 0.00 | 0 | 0 | New |
| Party of Peace and Unity | 148,954 | 0.25 | 0 | 10,664 | 0.02 | 0 | 0 | 0 |
| United Russian Party Rus' | 147,441 | 0.25 | 0 | 570,453 | 0.97 | 0 | 0 | New |
| Democratic Party | 136,295 | 0.23 | 0 | 94,810 | 0.16 | 0 | 0 | New |
| Russian Constitutional Democratic Party | 113,190 | 0.19 | 0 | | | | 0 | New |
| Union of People for Education and Science | 107,448 | 0.18 | 0 | 16,111 | 0.03 | 0 | 0 | New |
| People's Republican Party | 80,420 | 0.13 | 0 | 2,995 | 0.01 | 0 | 0 | New |
| Other parties | | | | 288,866 | 0.49 | 0 | 0 | – |
| Independents | | | | 15,843,626 | 26.86 | 67 | 67 | −38 |
| Against all | 2,851,958 | 4.78 | – | 7,744,998 | 13.13 | 3 | 3 | −5 |
| Total | 59,684,742 | 100.00 | 225 | 58,975,063 | 100.00 | 225 | 450 | 0 |
| Valid votes | 59,684,742 | 98.44 | | 58,975,063 | 97.93 | | | |
| Invalid/blank votes | 948,435 | 1.56 | | 1,247,491 | 2.07 | | | |
| Total votes | 60,633,177 | 100.00 | | 60,222,554 | 100.00 | | | |
| Registered voters/turnout | 108,906,250 | 55.67 | | 108,906,250 | 55.30 | | | |
Source: Nohlen & Stöver, IPU, 2003 elections

== Legacy ==
The 2003 election is cited by scholars as a turning point in Russian politics, as it marked the moment the federal parliament effectively became a rubber stamp body.
