= Nikolai Leonov =

KGB officer and Russian politician (1928–2022)

Nikolai Sergeyevich Leonov
- Николай Сергеевич Леонов
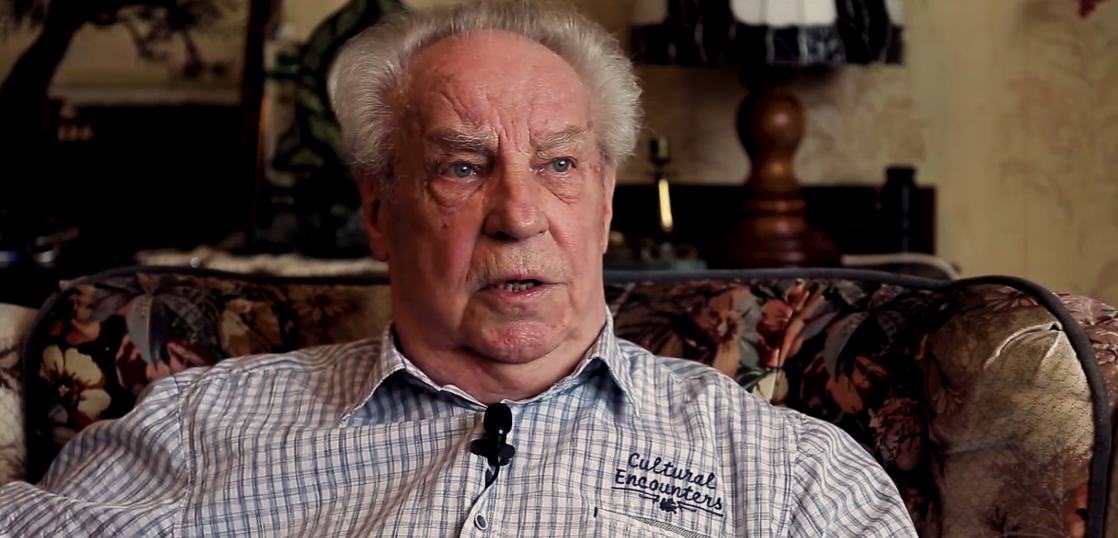
- Leonov in the documentary film Unblock Cuba
- Born: 12 March 1928; Almazovo, Ryazan Oblast, Soviet Union
- Died: 27 April 2022 (aged 93); Moscow, Russia
- Resting place: Troyekurovskoye Cemetery
- Citizenship: Soviet, Russian
- Education: Moscow State Institute of International Relations; Academy of Foreign Intelligence
- Occupations: Politician, intelligence officer
- Political party: Communist Party of the Soviet Union (until 1991); People's Union

Nikolai Sergeyevich Leonov (Russian: Никола́й Серге́евич Лео́нов; 22 August 1928 – 27 April 2022) was a Russian politician, senior KGB officer, and Latin America expert in the Soviet Union.

== Career ==
He studied Spanish language at MGIMO. In 1953, at the age of 25, Leonov was posted to Mexico City, where he learned Spanish at the Autonomous University. In the course of the sea voyage, he met Raúl Castro, who was returning from a European youth festival. On arrival in Mexico he took up a junior post in the Soviet embassy.

In 1955, Leonov met Che Guevara in Mexico City through Raúl Castro. Leonov violated embassy rules by visiting Guevara, who was fascinated with Soviet life. After answering some of Guevara's questions, Leonov gave him Soviet literature. When Guevara went to the embassy to pick up the books the two men talked again, the last time they talked in Mexico. Recalled to Moscow in November 1956, Leonov was discharged from the foreign service and deciding to pursue a career as a historian of Latin America, went to work as a translator for the official Soviet Spanish-language publishing house, Editorial Progreso. In the late summer of 1958, he was invited to join the KGB. On 1 September, he began a two-year intelligence training course, which was interrupted, according to him, by the Cuban Revolution. In October 1959 his superiors ordered him to leave his studies and accompany Anastas Mikoyan to Mexico.

In February 1960, he accompanied Soviet Deputy Premier Anastas Mikoyan on his visit to Havana, where he renewed his contact with Guevara to whom he gave a precision marksman's pistol "on behalf of the Soviet people." During the 1960s, he served as a senior KGB officer stationed in Mexico. During the October 1962 Cuban Missile Crisis, he received regular reports from agents in Florida with respect to American military preparations. He felt sure at the time that a nuclear confrontation would not be the result of the crisis. He served as interpreter on Fidel Castro's visit to the Soviet Union in 1963. In 1968, Leonov was recalled to Moscow, where he became a senior analyst.

A report compiled by his office in 1975 recognized the growing peril to the power of the Soviet Union in geopolitical terms, arguing that in keeping with the policy of the British Empire before it, the Soviet Union should limit the commitment of its resources to a few key areas from which its power could operate in a more selective fashion. The report suggested establishing a Soviet foothold on the Arabian Peninsula in "the most Marxist country" in the region, South Yemen. The report was returned to Leonov's office, without Andropov's signature of approval.

In the late 1970s and the early 1980s he traveled frequently to Poland to assess the situation and reportedly told the head of the KGB Yuri Andropov, in a heated discussion, that the prospects of Polish socialism looked bleak.

Between 1983 and January 1991, Leonov was Deputy Chief of the First Chief Directorate of the State Security Committee (KGB) of the Soviet Union, the second post within the KGB structure. Previously he was Sub-Director of the KGB's Analysis and Information Department (1973–1982) and Sub-Director of its Latin American Department (1968–1972). Leonov received a doctorate in Latin American History, from the Academy of Sciences of the Soviet Union, and wrote the book Essays on Contemporary Central American History (Moscow: Academy of Sciences, 1973). In 1985, he published his memoirs under the title Difficult Times. As of 1998, he was a professor at the Institute of International Relations in Moscow.

In December 2003, Leonov was elected to the State Duma, the lower house of the Russian parliament, as a member of the nationalist Rodina party.

He died on 27 April 2022 in Moscow, aged 93. He was buried at Troyekurovskoye Cemetery.

== Awards ==
- Order of the October Revolution
- Two Orders of the Red Banner of Labour
- Order of the Red Star
