= Rodina watch I =

1950s Russian wristwatch

The Rodina watch I is a Russian wristwatch from the 1950s that used to be made by the First Moscow Watch Factory (the same factory that made the Poljot brand) and the Petrodvorets Watch Factory (the same factory that manufactures the Raketa watches). Currently the brand "Rodina" is owned by the Petrodvorets Watch Factory "Raketa". In 2012, a new collection was released by Raketa.
