= The Rodina =

The Rodina is design studio founded in 2012 by Tereza and Vit Ruller, currently based in The Hague, Netherlands. They are most well known for their print design and video design, including their award-winning video "Dutch Education: Budget Cuts". Their work was described as "more art than design" by the graphic design publication It's Nice That.

== Awards ==
- 1st Prize for Dutch Education: Budget Cuts, awarded by Dutch Ministry of Finance, exhibited at "What is inside the Koffer", Den Haag, NL, 2014
- Third prize for The Most Beautiful Czech Book 2012, for book Mox Nox: H. Herzberger, awarded by Ministry of Culture, Prague, CZ, 2013
