= Socialist United Party of Russia =

Socialist United Party of Russia Социалистическая единая партия России
- Abbreviation: SEPR (English); СЕПР (Russian)
- Leader: Vasily Shestakov; Yelena Mukhina
- Founders: Alexey Podberezkin; Ivan Rybkin
- Founded: 2 March 2002; 24 years ago
- Dissolved: 26 May 2007; 19 years ago
- Preceded by: Spiritual Heritage; Socialist Party of Russia; Union of Realists
- Merged into: A Just Russia
- Headquarters: Moscow, Russia
- Membership (2007): 65,000
- Ideology: Socialism; Patriotism; Christian left
- Political position: Centre-left to left-wing
- National affiliation: Rodina (2003–2004)
- Colours: Blue; Red
- Slogan: "Choose social justice!" (Russian: "Выбирай социальную справедливость!")

Website
- http://www.sepr.ru/

The Socialist United Party of Russia (USPR or SEPR; Russian: Социалистическая единая партия России; СЕПР; Sotsialisticheskaya yedinaya partiya Rossii, SEPR) was a socialist political party in Russia established in 2003, that succeeded the Spiritual Heritage movement. In the 2003 legislative elections it was part of the Rodina coalition that won 9.2 percent of the vote and 37 of the 450 seats in the Duma. In 2007 the party merged into Just Russia.
