= Mother Motherland =

Mother Motherland may refer to:

- Personification of Russia
- former name of the Mother Ukraine monument in Kyiv, Ukraine
- Mother Motherland (Saint Petersburg) at the Piskaryovskoye Memorial Cemetery, Saint Petersburg
- The Motherland Calls, monument in Volgograd, Russia called "Mother Motherland Calls" in Russian and colloquially known as "Mother Motherland"
