= Communist Party of the Russian Federation =

Political party in Russia

Communist Party of the Russian Federation Коммунистическая партия Российской Федерации
- Abbreviation: CPRF; КПРФ (KPRF)
- Chairman: Gennady Zyuganov
- First Deputy Chairmen: Ivan Melnikov; Yury Afonin
- Deputy Chairmen: Vladimir Kashin; Dmitry Novikov; Leonid Kalashnikov
- Parliamentary Leader: Gennady Zyuganov
- Founded: 14 February 1993; 33 years ago
- Preceded by: Communist Party of the Russian SFSR
- Headquarters: 16th building, Ol'khovskaya Ulitsa; Moscow 105066
- Newspaper: Pravda (81 regional editions)
- Youth wing: Komsomol
- Membership (2024): ▲160,000
- Ideology: Communism; Marxism–Leninism; Left-conservatism; Soviet patriotism
- Political position: Far-left
- National affiliation: National Patriotic Forces of Russia (Informal) (since 2010); People's Patriotic Union of Russia (1996–2010)
- Continental affiliation: UCP–CPSU
- International affiliation: IMCWP
- Colours: Red
- Slogan: Россия! Труд! Народовластие! Социализм! ("Russia! Labour! Rule of the people! Socialism!")
- Anthem: Гимн 1977
- Seats in the State Duma: 37 / 450
- Seats in the Federation Council: 3 / 178
- Governors: 3 / 85
- Seats in the Regional Parliaments: 449 / 3,928
- Ministers: 0 / 31

Party flag

Website
- kprf.ru (Russian); cprf.ru (English)

The Communist Party of the Russian Federation (CPRF) (Note: Russian: Коммунистическая партия Российской Федерации (КПРФ), romanized: Kommunisticheskaya partiya Rossiyskoy Federatsiyi (KPRF)) is a left-conservative, Soviet patriotic and Marxist–Leninist political party in Russia. It is the second-largest political party in Russia after United Russia. The youth organisation of the party is the Leninist Young Communist League.

The CPRF can trace its origin to the Russian Social Democratic Labour Party (RSDLP) established in March 1898. The party split in 1903 into a Menshevik (minority) and Bolshevik (majority) faction; the latter, led by Vladimir Lenin, is the direct ancestor of the Communist Party of the Soviet Union (CPSU) and is the party that seized power in the October Revolution of 1917. After the CPSU was banned in 1991 by Russian president Boris Yeltsin in the aftermath of a failed coup, the CPRF was founded at the Second Extraordinary Congress of Russian Communists on 14 February 1993 as the successor organisation of the Communist Party of the Russian Soviet Federative Socialist Republic (CPRSFSR). It was the ruling party in the State Duma, the lower house of the Russian Federal Assembly from 1998 to 1999.

The party's stated goal is to establish a new, modernized form of socialism in Russia through peaceful means. Described as left-conservative, immediate goals of the party include the nationalisation of natural resources, agriculture, and large industries within the framework of a mixed economy, with socialist relations of production that allow for the growth of small and medium enterprises in the private/non-state sector.

== History ==
The CPRF was founded on 14 February 1993 at the Second Extraordinary Congress of Russian Communists, where it declared itself to be the successor of the Communist Party of the Russian Soviet Federative Socialist Republic (CPRSFSR). It formed through the merger of successor groups to the Communist Party of the Soviet Union (CPSU), including Roy Medvedev's Socialist Party of the Working People (of left-socialist orientation), Alexei Prigarin's Union of Communists; and much of the membership of the Stalinist Russian Communist Workers Party (although party leader Viktor Anpilov rejected the new party). The CPRF quickly became the largest party in Russia, with 500,000 members soon after its founding, more than double all the other parties membership combined.

Gennady Zyuganov, a co-founder of the party along with senior former Soviet politicians Yegor Ligachev, Anatoly Lukyanov and others, was elected to be party leader at the Second Extraordinary Congress. Zyuganov had been a harsh critic of Alexander Yakovlev, the so-called "godfather of glasnost", on the CPSU Central Committee. After the collapse of the Soviet Union in 1991, he became active in the Russian "national-patriotic" movement, being the chairman of the National Salvation Front (some authors call him a nationalist).

Following the CPRF's success in the 1995 legislative election, it emerged as the primary opposition to incumbent President Boris Yeltsin for the 1996 presidential election, whose approval rating was in single digits. In order to oppose Yeltsin, Zyuganov organised a "popular-patriotic bloc" of nationalist organisations to support his candidacy. After the election—which Yeltsin won with 54% of the vote—on 7 August 1996 the coalition supporting Zyuganov was transformed into an official organisation, the People's Patriotic Union of Russia (NPSR), consisting of more than 30 left-wing and nationalist organisations, including the Russian All-People's Union, led by Sergey Baburin. Zyuganov was its chairman. It went on to support Zyuganov in the 2000 presidential election. The NPSR was meant to form the basis of a two-party system, with the NPSR opposing the ruling "party of power". Yeltsin appointed a Yuri Maslyukov to his Cabinet, improve his testy relations with CPRF-dominated legislature.

The party suffered a sharp decline in the 2003 legislative election, going from 113 seats to 52. Zyuganov called the 2003 elections a "revolting spectacle" and accused the Kremlin of setting up a "Potemkin party", Rodina, to steal its votes. The CPRF was endorsed by Sergey Baburin's People's Union for the 2007 Russian parliamentary elections.

In the 2012 presidential election, Zyuganov denounced election irregularities in the 2011 legislative election, but he also expressed his opposition to the organisers of the mass demonstrations of December 2011, which he viewed as orchestrated by ultra-liberals exploiting unrest. The party played only a minor role as a catalyst in the protests. Party rallies on 18 December 2011 in protest of election irregularities in Moscow and Saint Petersburg were attended by only a few thousand, mostly elderly, party supporters.

In 2014, the party called for Russia to formally recognise the separatist Donetsk People's Republic and the Luhansk People's Republic, something that would happen in 2022 preceding Russia's invasion of Ukraine.

After Russia was sanctioned for systematic doping in the run-up to the 2018 Winter Olympics, Zyuganov proposed sending Russian fans to the Games with a Soviet Victory Banner.

In 2021, the party's headquarters were raided by Russian authorities and a party official was barred from entering his office in the State Duma after it refused to accept the results of an online parliamentary election vote and attempting to file a lawsuit against the results.

Following the 2022 Russian invasion of Ukraine, the CPRF published a statement in support of the invasion and accused NATO of planning "to enslave Ukraine" and thus creating "critical threats to the security of Russia". It called for the "demilitarization and denazification" of Ukraine. The party framed the conflict as that between the Ukrainian Banderites and fascists, who have been perpetrating genocide against Russian speakers, and liberating Russian forces. The CPRF also accused the United States and NATO of deploying European fascist sympathizers and Middle Eastern terrorists to Ukraine to fight the Russian army. Two members out of 57 of CPRF's Duma caucus, Vyacheslav Markhaev and Mikhail Matveev, have expressed opposition to the war, although they support the "protection of the people of Donbass".

A few younger members of the CPRF spoke publicly against the war in Ukraine, although their criticisms only refer to Russia's military campaign outside of Donbass, while they fully support the narrative that Ukraine is governed by "neo-Nazis".

As a result of the party's actions of endorsing the invasion of Ukraine, 55 of the 57 CPRF lawmakers, including Zyuganov, have been sanctioned by the United States Department of Treasury, HM Treasury of the United Kingdom, Global Affairs Canada, Japan, Australia and the European Commission.

In July 2022, CPRF leader Gennady Zyuganov allowed the party to propose a merger with the left-conservative party A Just Russia — For Truth, but only if the new party adopted the communist program. The day before, the leader of the A Just Russia Sergey Mironov said that he "does not see any obstacles to the creation in Russia of a large coalition of left-wing patriotic forces".

On 6 July 2025, a CPRF congress adopted a resolution calling the 1956 report "On the Cult of Personality and Its Consequences" made by Nikita Khrushchev erroneous.

== Ideology ==
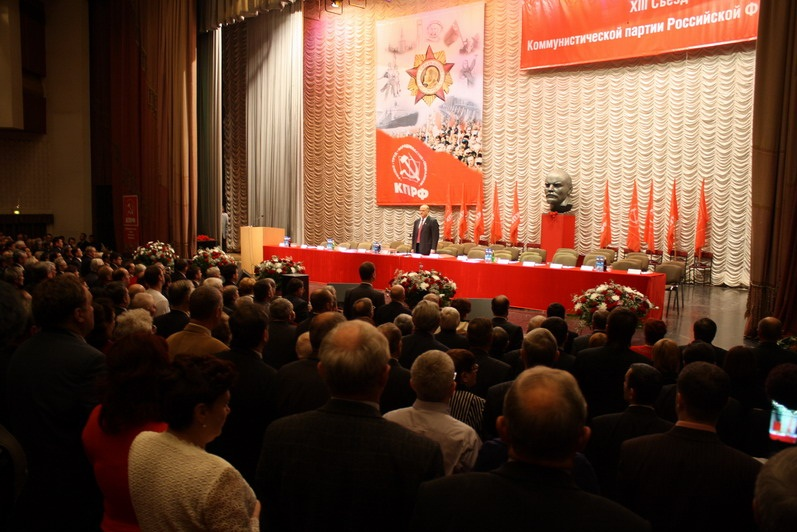
XIII Congress of the Communist Party of the Russian Federation in 2008

The party advocates for a socialist transformation of Russia through peaceful means within a pluralistic political framework. The CPRF considers the multi-sector socialist market system as developed in China to be a model which should be emulated within Russia. The party supports state ownership over major industries, the renationalization of businesses privatized after the collapse of the Soviet Union, giving out subsidies to currently existing state-owned firms and maintaining large welfare benefits. The CPRF has also maintained stable relationships with many businesses, including small and large private companies, worker cooperatives, and organizations which trace their lineage to the Soviet era. In 2002, it was described as left-wing nationalist.

The CPRF's current programme was adapted in 2008, where the CPRF declared that it is the only political organisation that consistently upholds the rights of the workers and national interests. According to the programme, the strategic goal of the party is to build in Russia a "renewed socialism, Socialism of the 21st century". The program of the Communist Party declared that the party is guided by Marxism–Leninism, based on the experience and achievements of domestic and world science and culture. According to the party, there comes a "confrontation between the New World Order and the Russian people with its thousand-year history, and with its qualities", "communality and great power, deep faith, undying altruism and decisive rejection of lures mercantile bourgeois liberal-democratic paradise".

According to its program, the CPRF considers it necessary to reform the country in three phases. In the first phase, it is needed to achieve workers' power through representation by a coalition led by the CPRF. Achieving this goal will help eliminate the devastation from the standpoint of the party, the consequences conducted in the past decade of reforms, in particular by the nationalisation of property privatised in the 1990s. However, in this case small producers will remain and moreover will be organised to protect them from robbery by "big business, bureaucrats, and mafia groups". It is planned to reform the management of enterprises through the creation of councils at various levels. The party also plans to transform Russia into a Soviet republic. In the second stage, the role of councils and trade unions will increase even more. A gradual transition in the economy will be made to a socialist form of economic activity, but a small private equity is still retained. Finally, the third phase is to build socialism.

The First Secretary Gennady Zyuganov also expressed that they should learn from China's successful example and build Russian socialism. He also encouraged all party members to read "Selected works of Deng Xiaoping". He said during his visit to China in 2008: "Had we learned from the success of China earlier, the Soviet Union would not have dissolved".

Marxist theoretician Boris Kagarlitsky wrote in 2001: "It is enough to recall that within the Communist movement itself, Zyuganov's party was at first neither the sole organisation, nor the largest. Bit by bit, however, all other Communist organisations were forced out of political life. This occurred not because the organisations in question were weak, but because it was the CPRF that had received the Kremlin's official approval as the sole recognised opposition".

=== Party programme ===
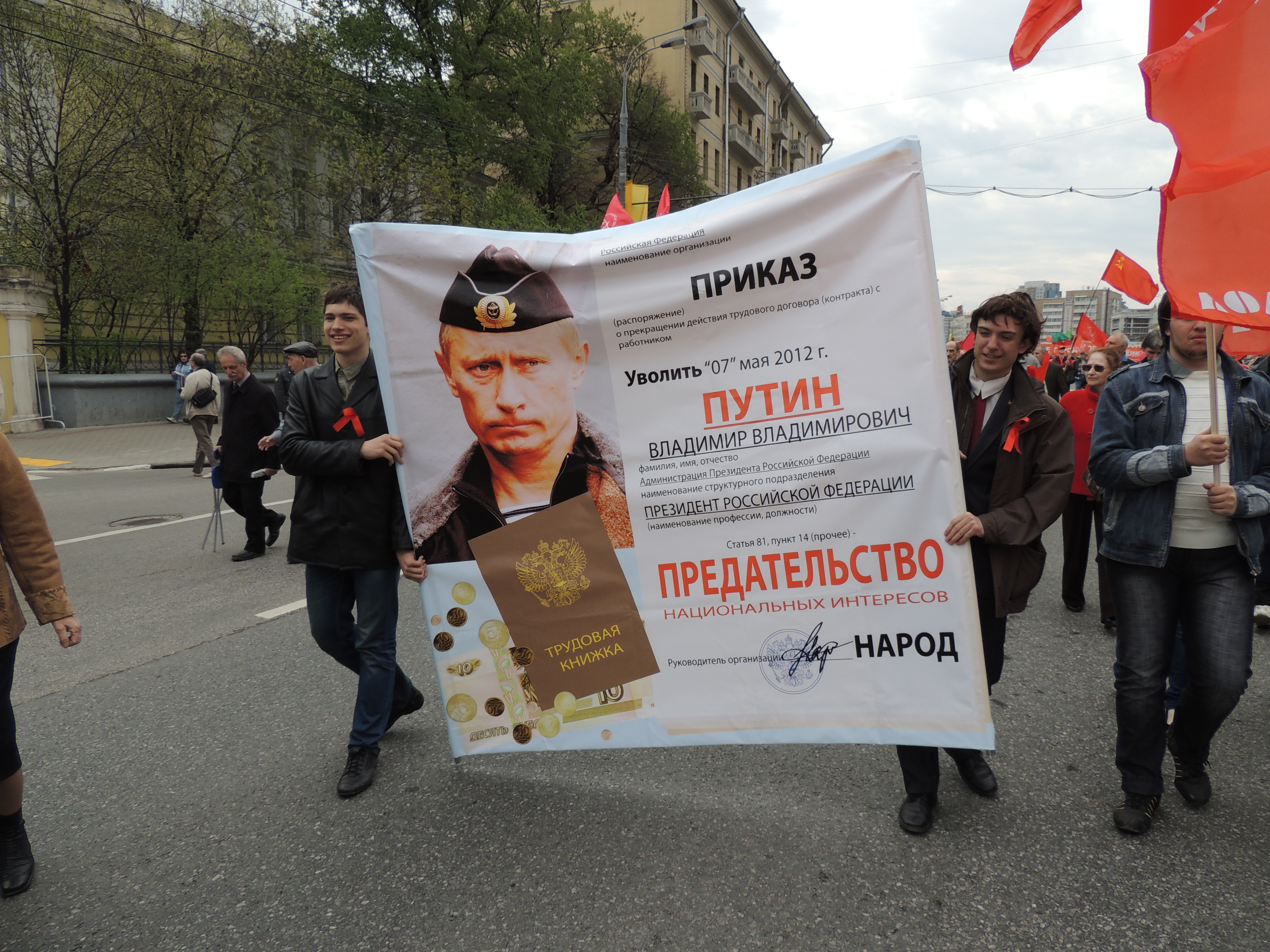
Communist protesters with a sign portraying an "order of dismissal" for Vladimir Putin for "betrayal of the national interests", Moscow, 1 May 2012.

Under the present conditions in the Russian Federation, the CPRF calls for the following proposals:

- Stop the extinction of the country, restore benefits for large families, reconstruct the network of public kindergartens and provide housing for young families.
- Nationalise natural resources in Russia and the strategic sectors of the economy; revenues in these industries are to be used in the interests of all citizens.
- Return to Russia from foreign banks the state financial reserves and use them for economic and social development.
- Break the system of total fraud in the elections.
- Create a truly independent judiciary.
- Carry out an immediate package of measures to combat poverty and introduce price controls on essential goods.
- Not raise the retirement age.
- Restore government responsibility for housing and utilities, establish fees for municipal services in an amount not more than 10% of family income, stop the eviction of people to the streets and expand public housing.
- Increase funding for science and scientists to provide decent wages and all the necessary research.
- Restore the highest standards of universal and free secondary and higher education that existed during the Soviet era.
- Ensure the availability and quality of health care.
- Vigorously develop high-tech manufacturing.
- Ensure the food and environmental security of the country and support the large collective farms for the production and processing of agricultural products.
- Prioritise domestic debt over foreign debt
- Introduce progressive taxation; low-income citizens will be exempt from paying taxes.
- Create conditions for development of small and medium enterprises.
- Ensure the accessibility of cultural goods, stop the commercialisation of culture, defend Russian culture as the foundation of the spiritual unity of multinational Russia, the national culture of all citizens of the country.
- Stop the slandering of the Russian and Soviet history.
- Take drastic measures to suppress corruption and crime.
- Strengthen national defense and expand social guarantees to servicemen and law enforcement officials.
- Ensure the territorial integrity of Russia and the protection of compatriots abroad.
- Institute a foreign policy based on mutual respect of countries and peoples to facilitate the voluntary restoration of the Union of States.

The party is in favour of cooperation with the Russian Orthodox Church. According to the words of Zyuganov, the CPRF is a party of scientific, but not militant atheism. The rapprochement has been criticised by Andrei Brezhnev, grandson of Soviet leader Leonid Brezhnev. Propaganda of any religion is banned inside the party. The CPRF celebrates the rule of Joseph Stalin. Zyuganov and the party support social conservatism and voted in favor of the ban on the "promotion of non-traditional sexual relations to minors", commonly known as the Russian gay propaganda law. During the Russian invasion of Ukraine, the party has taken a pro-war stance. The party leader, Gennady Zyuganov, called in the Duma for a general mobilization.

=== Internal factions ===
Since its founding the CPRF has had several distinct internal factions:

- Left-wing nationalists – This faction supports Russian nationalism and national communism; CPRF leader Gennady Zyuganov is from this tendency. The left-wing nationalists in the party identify socialism historically with Russia and Russia culturally with socialism. They are influenced by the writings of historian Lev Gumilyov and see class struggle as having evolved into struggle between civilisations.
- Marxist–Leninists – The Marxist–Leninist faction of the party has a traditional Leninist understanding of class struggle and socialism. They are against both nationalism and party reformers. This tendency is heavily reflected in the party's rank-and-file membership. Richard Kosolapov was a prominent member of this group.
- Reformers – The party's reformist faction is composed of Eurocommunists and social democrats, who have a generally critical view of the Soviet Union. This faction had a majority at the Second Extraordinary Congress, but has declined since then. The faction also has members that adhere to democratic socialism and anarcho-communism. Jeff Monson was a prominent anarcho-communist within the CPRF and served as the Special Representative for International Cooperation of the party's sport club.

== Party structure ==
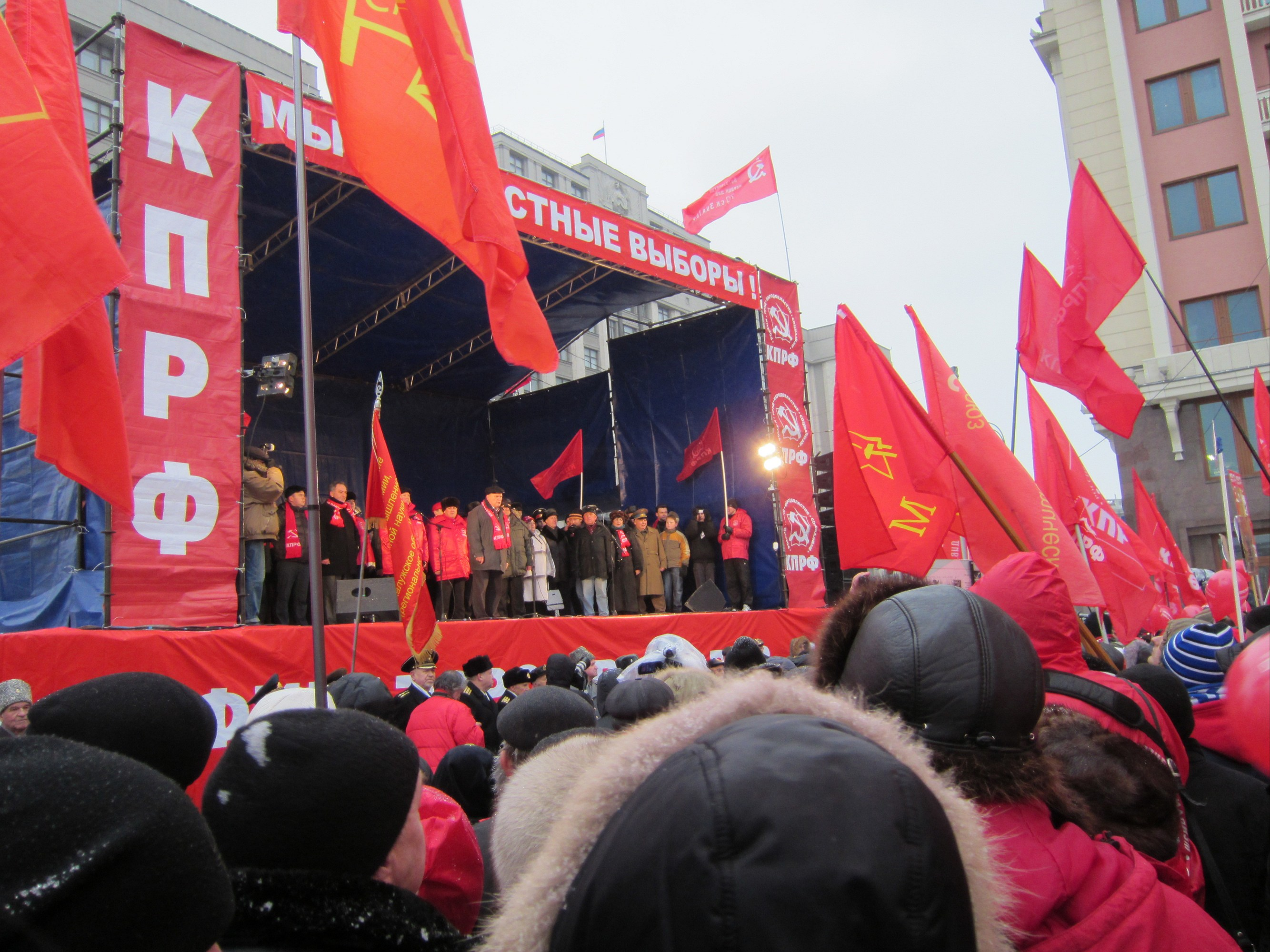
Communist Party rally on Manezhnaya Square, Moscow, 18 December 2011.

The CPRF is legally registered in Russia. In organisational terms, it largely mirrors the CPSU, with the party being led by a Central Committee with a commitment to democratic centralism. It has regional offices in 81 federal subjects. Each regional office is controlled by the local (oblast, city, etc.) committee, headed by the First Secretary. The headquarters of the party is in Moscow. The Leninist Komsomol of the Russian Federation is the youth organisation of the party.

=== International cooperation ===
In 1993, the party founded the Union of Communist Parties – Communist Party of the Soviet Union. The Union was originally led by Oleg Shenin, but in 2001 Zyuganov was elected Chairman in his place, a position he holds to this day; Shenin did not accept his removal and split away from the organisation to re-establish the Communist Party of the Soviet Union.

The party has friendly relations with the Party of the European Left, but it is not a member of it. The party also has friendly relations with the Chinese Communist Party.

On 24 March 2017, the party sent a delegation to North Korea and signed a "protocol on cooperation" with the Workers' Party of Korea. During the visit, a stone was placed in the Juche Tower.

In October 2017 the party hosted the 19th International Meeting of Communist and Workers Parties in the city of Saint Petersburg, marking the centenary of the October Revolution, with an attendance of over 100 parties from around the globe.

=== Media ===
Pravda is the newspaper of the Communist Party; it has 81 regional editions.

Left-wing nationalist newspaper Sovetskaya Rossiya has also friendly ties with the Communist Party, but is not officially affiliated with it. Ultra-nationalist newspaper Zavtra used to support the Communist Party, but in 2005 it switched its support to Rodina.

=== Finances ===
According to the financial report of the CPRF, in 2006 the party received 127,453,237 ₽ (US$3,998,835):

- 29% – membership fees
- 30% – the federal budget
- 6% – donations
- 35% – other incomes

In 2006, the party spent 116,823,489 ₽ (US$3,665,328):

- 5% – for the maintenance of regional offices
- 21% – on promotion (information, advertising, publishing and printing)
- 10% – the content of the governing bodies
- 7% – the preparation and conduct of elections and referendums
- 36% – content publishers, media and educational institutions

On 19 October 2008, the leader of the party Gennady Zyuganov appealed to the citizens of Russia to financially support the party to implement its policy goals.

== Popular support and electoral results ==
The CPRF is strong in large cities and major industrial and scientific centers ("naukograds") as well as in the small towns and cities around Moscow. One of the few polling stations that gave a success to the CPRF during the 2007 Russian legislative election was at Moscow State University. The CPRF is also strong in the far east of Russia, in Siberia, and the Ural. Supporters of the CPRF include those who suffered economically and politically from the collapse of the Soviet Union. The party is considered to depend on the nostalgia for the Soviet Union, having the largest poll of voters among the elderly.

=== Presidential elections ===
In all presidential elections that have been held in the Russian Federation, the CRPF's candidate has finished second. In 2012, several opposition politicians, including Boris Nemtsov, posited that Dmitry Medvedev admitted to them that Zyuganov would actually have won the 1996 Russian presidential election if not for fraud in favor of Boris Yeltsin. According to the official results, Zyuganov received 17.18% of the votes in the 2012 Russian presidential election. According to independent observers, there was large-scale fraud in favor of Vladimir Putin. Zyuganov called the election "one of thieves, and absolutely dishonest and unworthy".

Election	Candidate	First round		Second round		Result
Election	Candidate	Votes	%	Votes	%	Result
1991 (Note: As Communist Party of the Russian Soviet Federative Socialist Republic.)	Nikolai Ryzhkov	13,359,335	17.22			Lost
1996	Gennady Zyuganov	24,211,686	32.03	30,102,288	40.31	Lost
2000	Gennady Zyuganov	21,928,468	29.21			Lost
2004	Nikolay Kharitonov	9,513,313	13.69			Lost
2008	Gennady Zyuganov	13,243,550	17.72			Lost
2012	Gennady Zyuganov	12,318,353	17.18			Lost
2018	Pavel Grudinin	8,659,206	11.77			Lost
2024	Nikolay Kharitonov	3,768,470	4.37			Lost

=== Parliamentary elections ===
Election	Leader	Votes	%	Seats	+/–	Rank	Government
1993	Gennady Zyuganov	6,666,402	12.40	42 / 450		3rd	Opposition
1995	Gennady Zyuganov	15,432,963	22.30	157 / 450	▲115	▲1st	Opposition (1995–1998)
1995	Gennady Zyuganov	15,432,963	22.30	157 / 450	▲115	▲1st	Coalition (1998–1999)
1995	Gennady Zyuganov	15,432,963	22.30	157 / 450	▲115	▲1st	Opposition (1999)
1999	Gennady Zyuganov	16,196,024	24.29	113 / 450	▼44	1st	Opposition
2003	Gennady Zyuganov	7,647,820	12.61	51 / 450	▼62	▼2nd	Opposition
2007	Gennady Zyuganov	8,046,886	11.57	57 / 450	▲6	2nd	Opposition
2011	Gennady Zyuganov	12,599,507	19.19	92 / 450	▲35	2nd	Support
2016	Gennady Zyuganov	7,019,752	13.34	42 / 450	▼50	2nd	Support
2021	Gennady Zyuganov	10,660,599	18.93	57 / 450	▲15	2nd	Support
2026	Gennady Zyuganov	9,051,776	13.66	37 / 450	▼20	2nd	

=== Regional elections ===
In February 2005, the CPRF defeated the ruling pro-Kremlin party United Russia in elections to the regional legislature of Nenets Autonomous Okrug, obtaining 27% of the popular vote.

In the Moscow Duma election held on 4 December 2005, the party won 16.75% and 4 seats, the best ever result for the CPRF in Moscow. In the opinion of some observers, the absence of the Rodina party contributed to the Communists' success.

On 11 March 2007, elections took place for 14 regional and local legislatures. The CPRF performed very well and increased its votes in most of the territories; it came second in Oryol Oblast (23.78%), Omsk Oblast (22.58%), Pskov Oblast (19.21%) and Samara Oblast (18.87%), Moscow Oblast (18.80%), Murmansk Oblast (17.51%) and Tomsk Oblast (13.37%). These results testify that the CPRF is the most significant opposition party in Russia.

On 21 May 2007, the CPRF obtained an important success in the Volgograd's mayoral election. Communist candidate Roman Grebennikov won election as mayor with 32.47% of the vote and became the youngest mayor of a regional capital. In 2008, Roman Grebennikov switched his allegiance to United Russia, angering many Communists who accused him of using the CPRF as a tool to become elected.

On 7 April 2011, the CPRF candidate Ilya Potapov won the mayoral election in the town of Berdsk with a landslide victory over the United Russia candidates.

In 2015 gubernatorial elections, party's nominee Sergey Levchenko won the gubernatorial election in Irkutsk Oblast.

In the 2018 gubernatorial elections, Communist Party candidates Andrey Klychkov and Valentin Konovalov won the gubernatorial elections in the Oryol Oblast and Khakassia, respectively. In addition, in the election in Primorsky Krai, the party's candidate Andrey Ishchenko could pass in the second round of election in which lost, by official results. The result of those elections was declared invalid due to a large number of violations in connection with which recall election were scheduled for December 2018, but the Communist Party decided not to nominate its candidate for the new election.

In the 2018 elections to the regional parliaments, the Communist Party took first place in the voting on party lists in three regions. However, in two regions, United Russia still managed to get a relative majority in regional parliaments at the expense of deputies-single-mandate holders. Nevertheless, in Irkutsk Oblast, the party received a relative majority and is the largest faction in the Legislative Assembly.

== Gallery ==
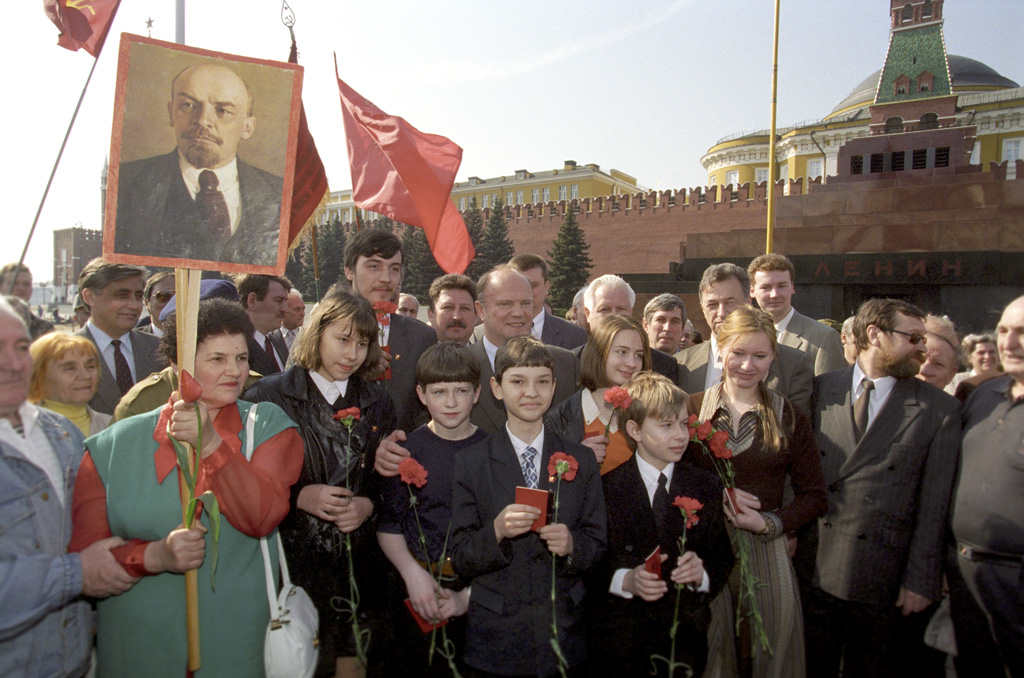
Zyuganov with members of the Leninist Komsomol of the Russian Federation

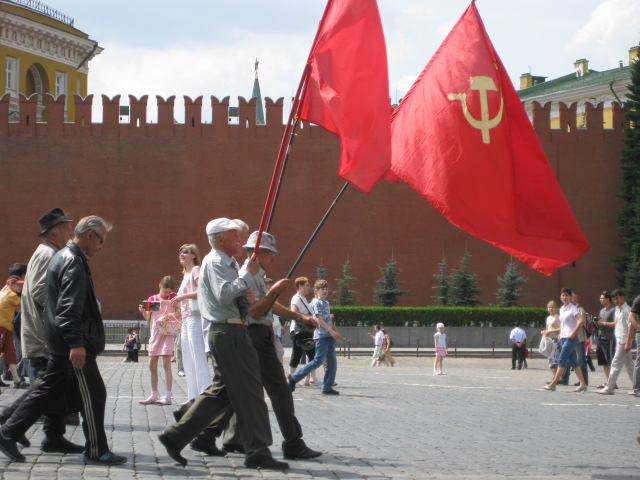
Demonstration of communists on the Red Square

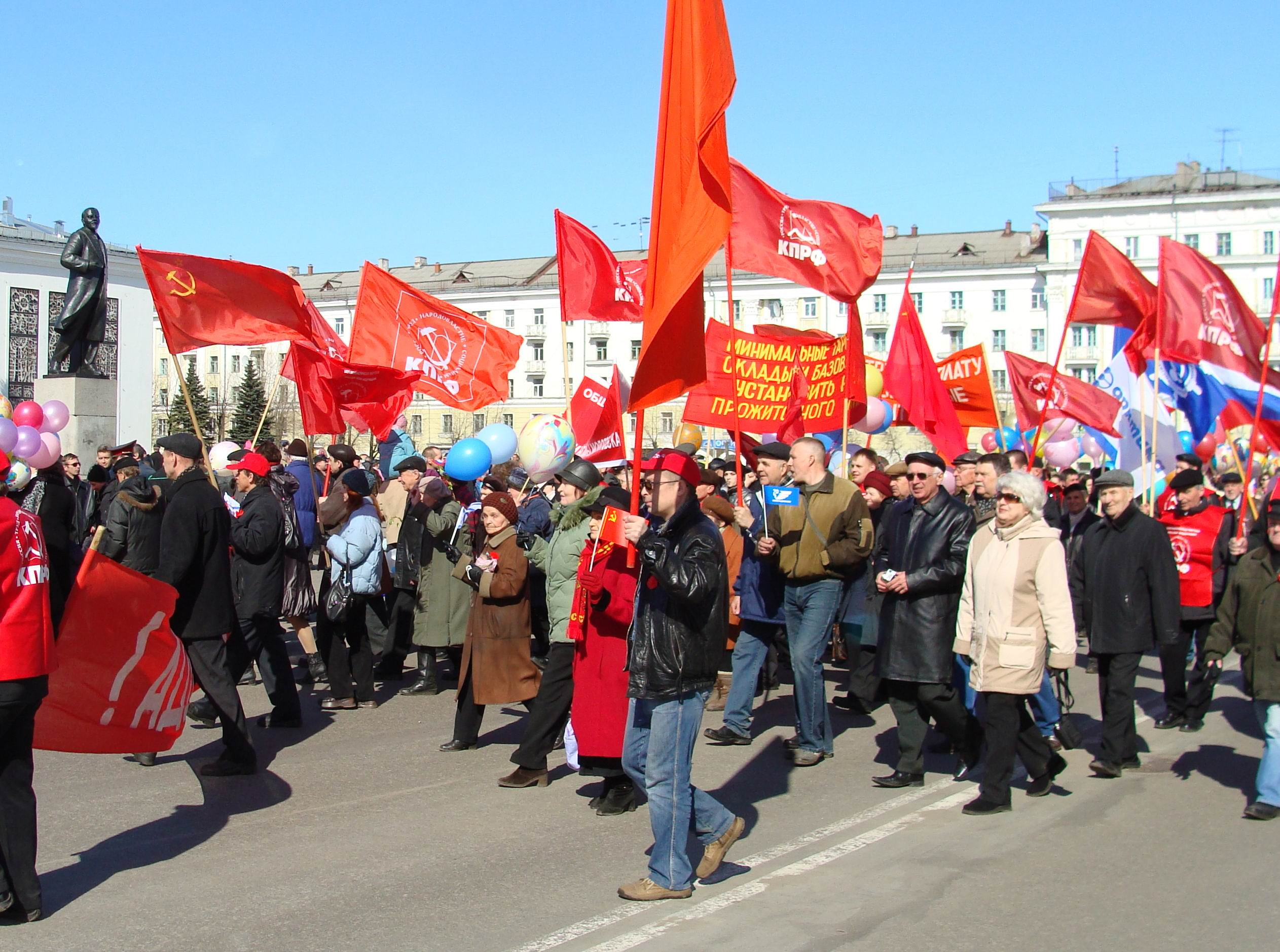
Communists marching on International Workers' Day in 2009, Severodvinsk

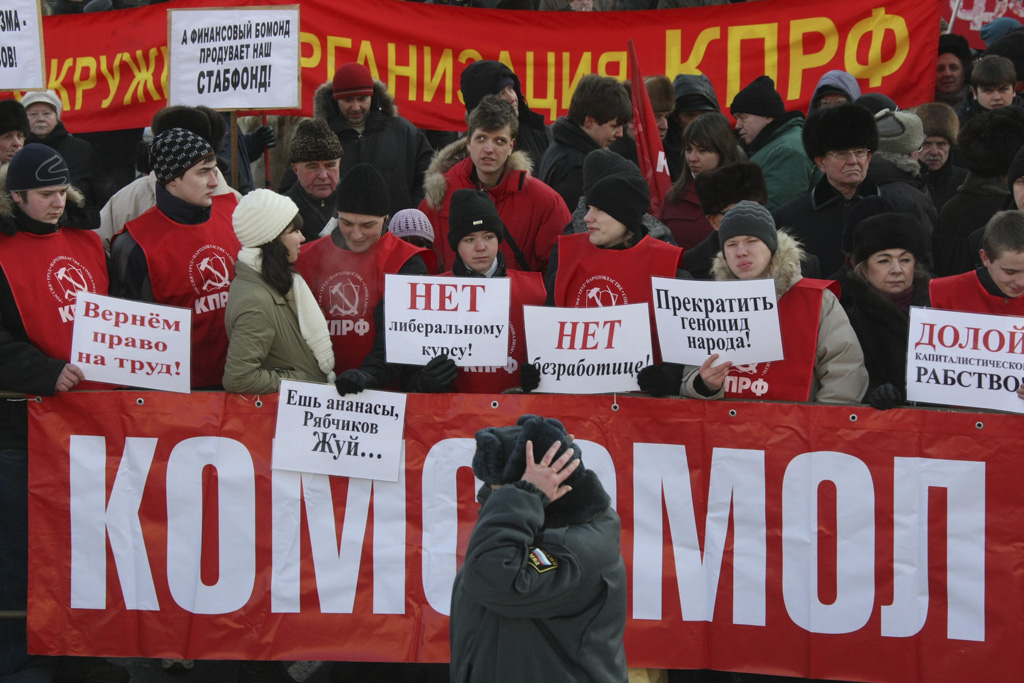
The Communist Party holds a demonstration on Triumfalnaya Square in Moscow

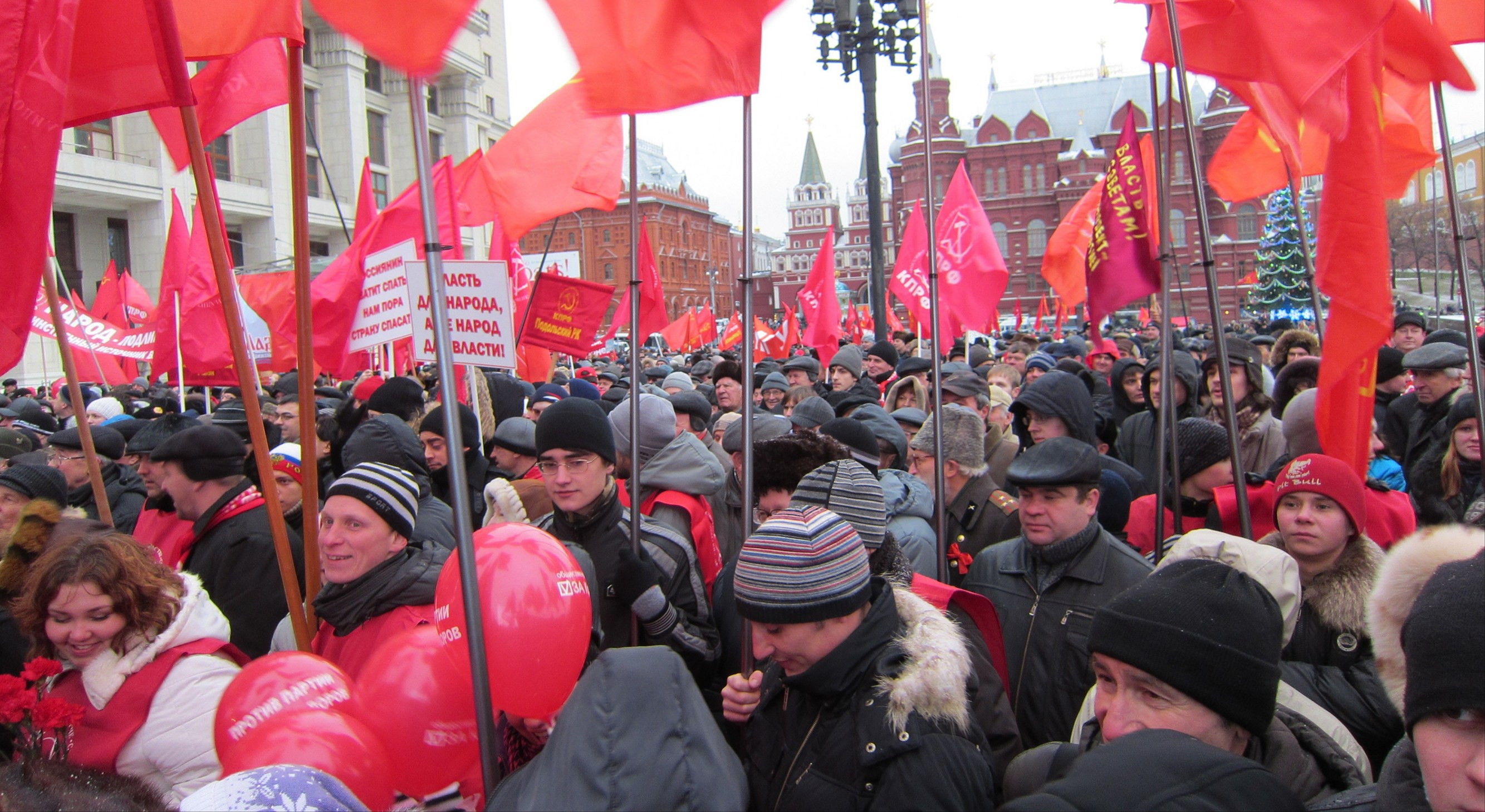
Demonstration of the party

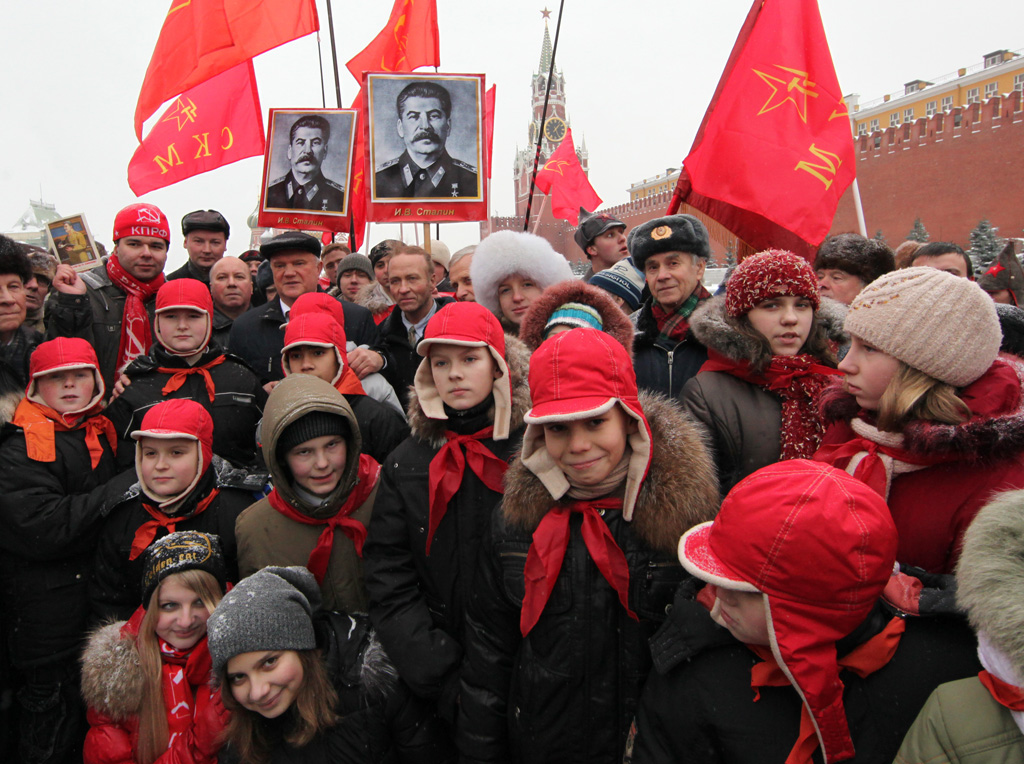
Party members lay down flowers at the tomb of Joseph Stalin

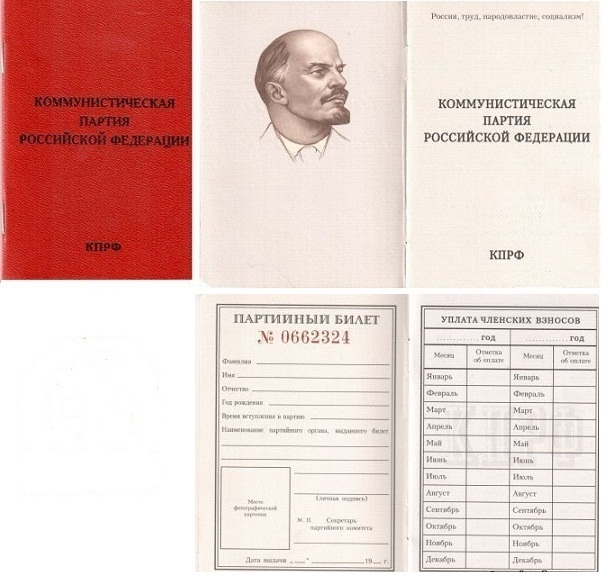
Party membership card

Flag of the Soviet Union (used in many parades)

== See also ==
- CPRF faction in the State Duma
- History of the Communist Party of the Soviet Union
- List of communist parties
- MFK KPRF
- Politics of Russia
- Red Belt (Russia)
