= Sergey Baburin =

Russian politician (born 1959)

- Сергей Бабурин
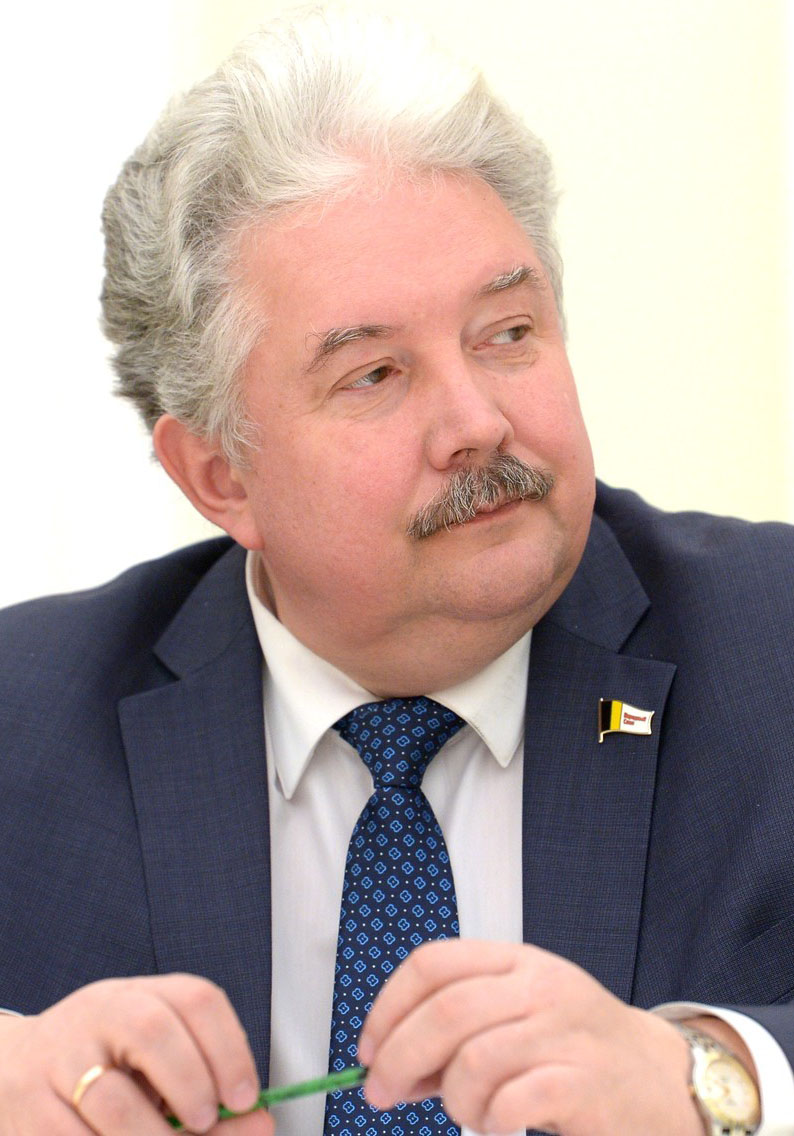
- Baburin in 2018

Member of the State Duma
- In office 7 December 2003 – 24 December 2007
- In office 12 December 1993 – 18 January 2000

Personal details
- Born: 31 January 1959 (age 67) Semipalatinsk, Kazakh SSR, Soviet Union (now Semey, Kazakhstan)
- Party: Russian All-People's Union
- Other political affiliations: People's Union (Russia) (until 2008); Rodina (formerly)
- Education: Omsk State University
- Sergey Baburin's voice Recorded 16 December 2012

Sergey Nikolayevich Baburin (Russian: Серге́й Николаевич Бабурин, born 31 January 1959) is a Russian nationalist politician and scholar of constitutional law, member of the State Duma of the first, second and fourth convocations where he served in the Committee on Civil, Criminal, Arbitral and Procedural Law, leader of the Russian All-People's Union and an ex-leader of the Rodina political party. He also served as a rector of the Russian State University of Trade and Economics (RGTEU) from 2002 to 2012.

In 2018, Baburin was a presidential candidate from the Russian All-People's Union.

== Life and career ==
Baburin was born in Semipalatinsk, Kazakh SSR, Soviet Union, where his parents were studying at the time. His father, Nikolai Naumovich Baburin, was a teacher who came from a long line of Sibiryaks (ethnically Russian natives of Siberia), and moved to Semipalatinsk from Tara, Omsk Oblast where Sergey later spent his childhood. His paternal grandfather, Naum Mikheevich Baburin, was a woodworker who built houses; during the Russian Civil War he expressed support for the White Army and was nearly shot by the Bolsheviks after they came to power. His paternal grandmother, Irina Sergeevna Baburina (née Koroleva), was a housewife.

Sergey's mother, Valentina Nikolaevna Baburina (née Kulbedina), was a surgeon. Her father, Nikolai Petrovich Kulbedin (Kulbeda), came from a Belarusian family and moved to Semipalatinsk from Motol, a village in the Ivanava District of the Brest Region in search of work. According to Baburin, some sources indicate that Nikolai belonged to a family of priests; he actively participated in the civil war fighting the Basmachi, made a political career, was arrested during the Great Purge, but was released and then died on his way home. His wife, Anna Maksimovna Kulbedina (née Volkova), came from exiled Cossacks, and spent all her life working as a children's nurse in a hospital.

Baburin holds a Ph.D. in law from Leningrad State University and served as Dean of Law at Omsk State University. In 1990, he was elected as a peoples' deputy in the Supreme Soviet of Russia. He was one of the few who voted against ratification of the Belovezha Accords in December 1991. He served in the Soviet Army in Afghanistan and garnered several awards for his service. He was the founder and one of the leaders of the Russian All-People's Union. During Russian constitutional crisis of 1993 he was one of the most outspoken leaders of the anti-Yeltsin opposition.

In the 2007 Duma election campaign, Baburin gained broad media attention by proposing a bill giving every citizen 4 million rubles (approximately 150,000 US dollars) as a means of one-time compensation for the wrongdoings of the privatization of state property in the early 90s.

== 2018 presidential campaign ==
On 22 December 2017, the Russian All-People's Union nominated Sergey Baburin as its presidential candidate for the 2018 Russian presidential election. On 24 December, Baburin filed registration documents with the CEC. The CEC rejected Baburin's bid on 25 December because it identified violations in the information provided regarding 18 of his party's 48 representatives. Baburin resubmitted the documents and they were approved by the CEC.

On 30 January 2018, Baburin handed over the signatures to the CEC. When testing revealed only 3.28% of invalid signatures, due to which he was admitted to the election.

Baburin received 0.65% (479,013 votes), finishing last out of the eight candidates.

== 2024 presidential campaign ==
Baburin was nominated by his party in December 2023 during the party's congress. He submitted documents to participate in the election on 26 December, which were registered on 29 December. Baburin collected the required number of signatures, but decided to withdraw on the day before the deadline to submit signatures 30 January 2024. He endorsed Putin for the 2024 election.

== See also ==
- Russian All-People's Union (1991–2001) and (2008–2025)
- People's Union (2001–2008)
