= Alexey Podberezkin =

Russian politician (born 1953)

- Алексей Подберёзкин
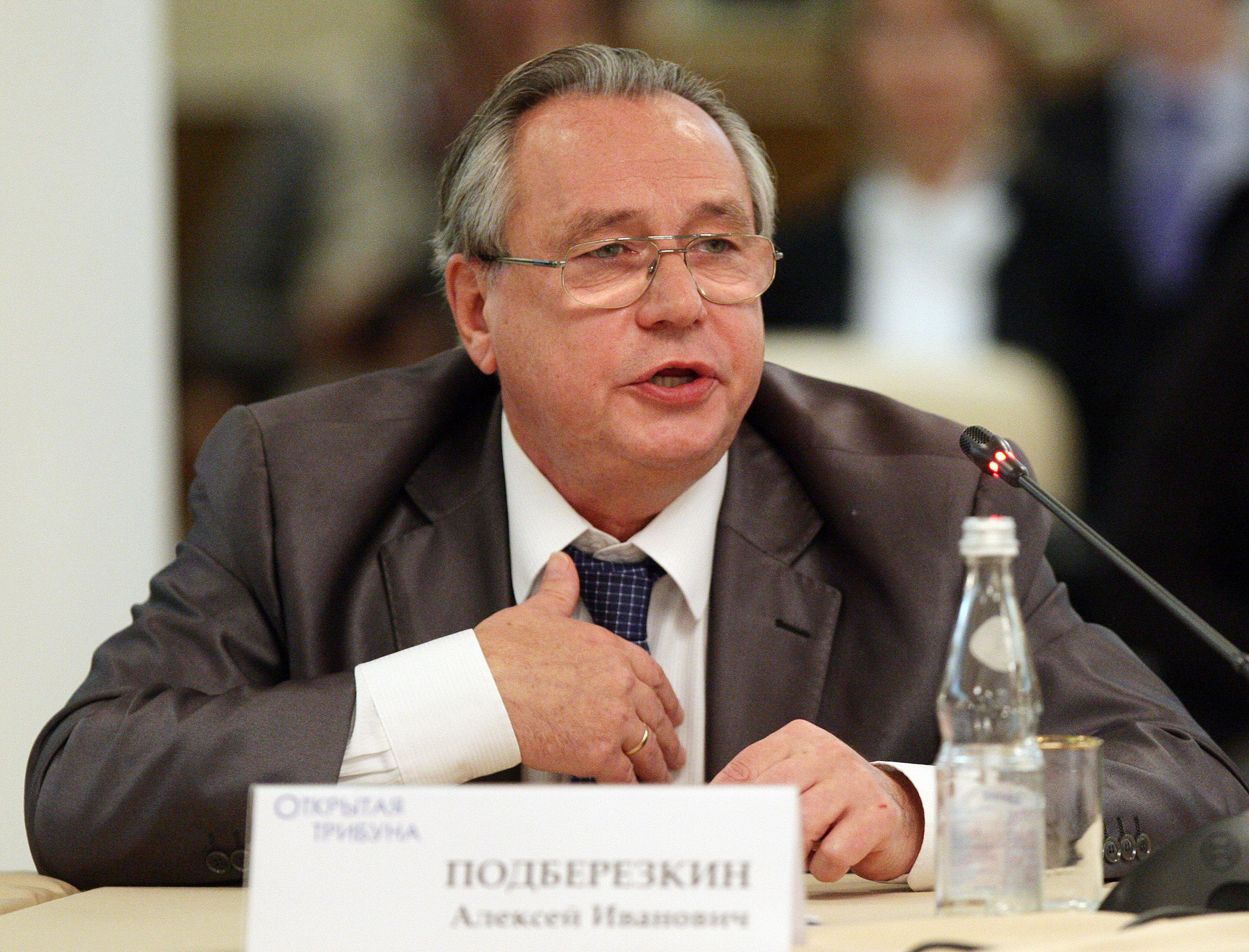
- Podberezkin in 2013
- Born: 7 February 1953 (age 73); Moscow, Russia
- Education: Moscow State Institute of International Relations
- Occupation: politician
- Awards: Member of Russian Academy of Natural Sciences; Member of the Russian Academy of Military Sciences

Alexey Ivanovich Podberezkin (also: Podberyozkin; Russian: Алексей Иванович Подберёзкин; born 7 February 1953) is a Russian politician, PhD in historical sciences, professor, member of Russian Academy of Sciences, member of Russian Academy of Military Sciences, president of the Russian-American University.

== Biography ==
Podberezkin was born on 7 February 1953 in Moscow into a family of workers. He graduated from Moscow State Institute of International Relations in 1979 with a degree in International relations. In 1982, Alexey Podberezkin got his Advance Degree in military-political problems and international relations and gained reputation as an expert in USA military politics.

Since 1981 to 1985, headed a group of consultants of the USSR Committee of Youth Organizations. In 1990, Podberezkin received Ph.D. in history. In 1994, founded the socio-political movement Spiritual Heritage, actively supporting the development of Russian science, culture, education and entrepreneurship. He featured communist and nationalist views, but in a relatively mild way.

Since 1995 to 99, he was a deputy of the Russian State Duma Federal Assembly of the 2nd convocation. In 2000 he ran for Russia's presidency. In 2005–2008, Podberezkin becomes a secretary general of the Socialist United Party of Russia. In 2008, he became chairman adviser of the Accounting Chamber of the Russian Federation.
