= The World Children's Winners Games =

- Founded: 2010
- Founder: Podari Zhizn
- Purpose: Rehabilitation of young cancer survivors
- Location: Moscow, Russia
- Region served: Worldwide
- Website: winnersgames.ru/eng

The World Children's Winners Games (Russian: Всемирные детские игры победителей, romanized: Vsemirnye detskie igry pobediteley) better known as The Winners games are international sports competitions for young cancer survivors. The project was launched by the Podari Zhizn Foundation in 2010. Since 2018 regional stages of the Winners Games are held not only in Russia but in other countries as well.

== Mission ==
The main purpose of the Winners Games is to help children who have overcome cancer get back to normal life and rehabilitate after the long battle with the disease. Project participants gain self-confidence, and learn that they are not different from other children, so they can lead the same active life they had led before, since sport is the very opposite of the disease. For many gravely ill children the dream to take part in the Winners Games gave an impetus for recovery. "When they are diseased, they think that it affects only them. But during such events children learn that everything can be overcome," says Chulpan Khamatova, actress and founder of the Gift of Life foundation. For doctors and staff of the Gift of Life Foundation, the Games serve as a clear demonstration of success in battling cancer. Besides competitions that take place in strict conformity with the requirements of sports federations, the program includes all kinds of workshops, excursions, and concerts. In addition, the project draws the attention of philanthropists, sponsors, and volunteers to the problems of childhood cancer and rehabilitation.

== Rules of conduct ==
Participation in athletic events of the Winners Games is open to children aged 7 to 16 years old who completed their treatment for an oncological disease. All participants are competing in six disciplines: track, swimming, table tennis, shooting, chess, and football in their respective age categories. There are no restrictions related to the physical fitness and sports training on the participation in the Winners Games, but a person may participate no more than twice. The Games Organizing Committee bares all expenses related to accommodation in Moscow, meals, transfer, sports equipment, entertainment and sightseeing programs. Participants cover only the cost of traveling to Moscow. Each child may be accompanied by one parent. In addition, the teams may include a doctor and a staff member of a charity foundation. Russian professional sports federations of all sports featured in the Games provide assistance with regard to organizing and hosting the competitions. Referees working on the project are internationally qualified and have worked at world sports championships.

== Regional stages ==
Different countries and Russian regions hold regional stages, so that the maximum number of children who have survived cancer are able to take part in the Winners Games. The team that will go to the World Children's Winners Games in Moscow is selected from the participants of this stage. In 2018 regional stages will be held in 4 countries (Hungary, Bulgaria, Belarus, and Kazakhstan), as well as in 10 Russian regions (Belgorod, Nizhny Novgorod, Chelyabinsk, Kaliningrad, Orenburg, Perm, Rostov, Samara, Tver and Sverdlovsk Regions). Approximately 1,300 children will take part in sports competitions.

In addition, nearly 30 Russian regions and 15 countries are forming teams to participate in the Winners Games without regional qualifying competitions. What is more, the Games Organizing Committee accepts requests from individual participants living in cities and countries that do not have regional stages.

== History ==
The first International onco-olympic Games, with approximately 200 children from four countries — Poland, Russia, Belarus and Ukraine, took place in the Polish capital Warsaw in 2007. Starting with 2010, the World Children's Winners Games were held in Russia at the biggest sports facilities of Moscow and Moscow Region.

2010
The First World Children's Winners Games were held on 14–16 June in Moscow at the Lokomotiv sports stadium. 200 children from Russia, Ukraine, Belarus, Poland, Armenia, Latvia, Romania, Hungary came to the capital of Russia. During the first day of the Games, immediately after the opening ceremony, competitions began in track, table tennis and shooting. The second day featured football, chess and swimming competitions. The competitions were conducted in accordance with the rules established by Russian organizers. Anton Sikharulidze, Olympic champion and the then Chairman of the Russian State Duma Committee for Physical Culture and Sport, served as the main referee of the First World Children's Winners Games.

Stoloto Company (part of S8 Capital holding) has been the general partner of the project for several consecutive years.

2011
The Second World Children's Winners Games were held in Moscow region on 4–7 August. More than 300 children from 8 countries took part in the competitions. Turkish and Czech teams joined the competition for the first time. During the four days of the competition a special group of children (participants of the photo project "We live on this Earth", including patients of Podari Zhizn Foundation) shared a non-stop photo report of the Winners Games on the Foundation's Facebook page.

2012
The Third World Children's Winners Games were conducted from 31 May to 2 June and gathered more than 350 young participants from 12 countries. Russian regions brought to Moscow 17 teams. Teams from Germany, Poland, Romania, Serbia and Azerbaijan came to participate for the first time. The competitions were held in the centre of Moscow, at the Gorky Park. The main referee of the competition was Shavarsh Karapetyan, ten-time finswimming world record-breaker, Merited Master of Sports of the USSR.

2013
More than 400 children from 10 countries came to the Fourth World Children's Winners Games in Moscow. The Games were held on 14–16 June at the CSKA arena. Starting this year, permanent participants of the Games were joined by Bulgaria. Since 2013 sports grounds and swimming pools of the Central Sport Club of the Army (CSKA) have become the main venue for the Games. The Honorary Chairman of the Judging Committee of the Winners Games was the legendary sportsman Alexander Popov, an outstanding Soviet and Russian swimmer, a four-time Olympic champion, a six-time World champion and a 21-time European champion.

2014
More than 450 children from 28 Russian regions ranging from Siberia to Kaliningrad, and 11 countries came to Moscow for the Fifth Anniversary World Children's Winners Games. The competitions were held on 20–22 June. Teams from Moldova and Kazakhstan came to Moscow for the first time. Sergey Shilov, a multiple Paralympic, World and Europe champion, a Master of Sport of International grade in biathlon, as well as track and field, was appointed the Honorary Chairman of the Judging Committee of the Fifth Winners Games.

2015
The Sixth World Children's Winners Games were held on 26–18 June at the Luzhniki sports complex. The event brought together nearly 500 children from 15 countries and 33 Russian regions. New participants featured teams from India and Croatia.

2016
The Seventh World Children's Winners Games were held from 29 June to 2 July. 500 participants from over 20 Russian regions and 14 countries, this time including teams from Portugal and Lithuania, gathered at the CSKA sports complex.

2017
The Eighth World Children's Winners Games were held on 2–4 June. 550 children from 16 countries and 31 Russian regions met to compete for dozens of medal sets. A record number of participants (more than 400 children from all countries) represented in the competition.

2018
The Ninth World Children's Winners Games were held in Moscow on 2–6 August. Besides teams from Russian regions, some 14 foreign delegations had come to the Games. For the first time, a youth table tennis competition was held during the Winners' Games.

== Interesting facts ==
- In different years the awards and diplomas were given to children who became champions of the World Children's Winners Games by renown Russian athletes.

Among them were: Svetlana Zhurova, an Olympic Champion in speed skating; Vladimir Salnikov, a four-time Olympic Champion, President of the Russian Swimming Federation; Svetlana Khorkina, a two-time Olympic Champion; Vladimir Kramnik, a World Chess Champion; Elena Dementieva and Marat Safin, famous Russian tennis players; Semen Elistratov, Vladimir Grigoriev, Ruslan Zakharov, 2014 Olympic Champions in speed skating; Ekaterina Gamova, an outstanding volleyball player; Olga Zaitseva, a two-time Olympic Champion in biathlon; Vadim Selyukin, a prize-winner of the Paralympic Games-2014 in sledge-hockey; Olga Semenova, a three-time Champion of the Paralympic Games in track and field; Tatiana Savostyanova, a prize-winner of the Paralympic Games in judo; Olesya Vladykina, a two-time Paralympic Champion in swimming, and many others.

- The champions of the 2015 Winners' Games were greeted by the ISS crew, namely cosmonauts Gennady Padalka and Mikhail Kornienko
- Following the Games, the Hungarian team was invited to meet the President of Hungary at the Presidential Palace.
- Veronika Skvortsova, Minister of Health of Russia, officially welcomed the participants of the Games in 2016.
- An official meeting with the champion of India in croquet was organized for the Indian team.
- The World Children's Winners Games charity project is actively supported by Russian celebrities. Many of them not only give awards to the winners of the Games, but also take part in the traditional "Fathers/Stars" football match between the parents of the participants and famous actors. During the nine years the project has existed, the following actors came to support the children who overcame the disease: Artur Smolyaninov, Anatoly Rudenko, Alexei Kravchenko, Ivan Stebunov, Vladimir Yaglych, Kirill Safonov, Denis Matrosov, Maxim Matveev, Andrei Sokolov and Dmitry Pevtsov, Ingeborga Dapkunaite and Mariya Aronova, Yuri Stoyanov and Valdis Pelsh.
- Charity concerts for participants were held by musicians from the M.Turetsky Choir, Alexei Kortnev and the rock band Neschastny Sluchai, Bravo and the Latvian musical group Brainstorm, as well as many other actors and performers
