= Dolina effect =

Type of real estate fraud in Russia

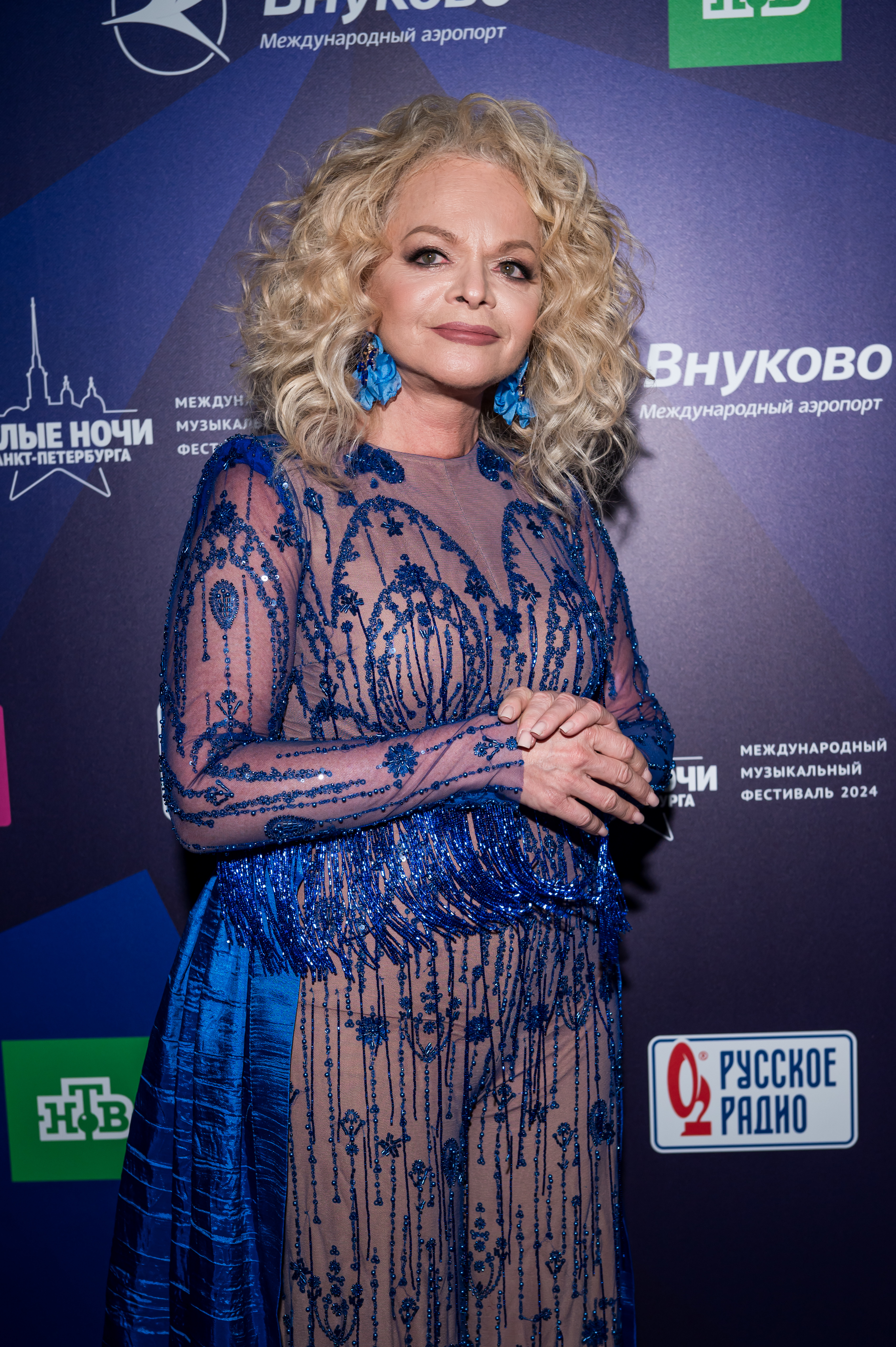
Larisa Dolina (photographed in summer 2024), whose case brought the real estate fraud scheme to light

The Dolina effect (Russian: Эффе́кт До́линой) describes a crisis on the Russian real estate market that started in autumn 2025 due to increased distrust of buyers towards sellers. The term gained wide prominence in media in connection to Larisa Dolina's sale of an upscale apartment in the city centre of Moscow.

Dolina, a Russian singer, fell for a scam and gave away the money she received from an innocent buyer. When the singer realised the mistake, she sued to recover her property from that buyer. She argued that because she was being pressured by scammers to sell her property, the transaction could not be legitimate. In fraud cases like this one, Russian courts often granted the recovery motion but would not order the money back. This is what the trial court ordered. Two appeals left the ruling intact, but the Supreme Court of Russia reversed the verdict.

The lower courts' judicial practice was leaving buyers with neither property nor money even if buyers were honest. This outcome highlighted criminals' abuse of the Civil Code of Russia. Some pretended to have fallen victim of a scam to fraudulently dispossess property buyers with the sanction of Russian courts, which favour sellers. Consequently, Russian mass media coined the term "Dolina scheme" (Russian: схема Долиной).

The notoriety of the case disrupted the secondary real estate market in the country as buyers started to become more suspicious of sellers. The scheme often employs pensioners (hence another nickname for the scam, "granny scheme", бабушкина схема), so trust in elderly sellers collapsed. Clients increasingly required additional steps to hedge against the scam, such as inviting additional witnesses, making extra background checks and modifying sale deeds. Dolina herself has suffered heavy damage to her reputation due to the association with the unjust enrichment scheme.

== Dolina's case ==
=== Facts ===
Larisa Dolina, a Russian singer who was then 68 years old, had a 236 m^{2} (2,540 sq ft) five-bedroom apartment, located in the prestigious district of Khamovniki in central Moscow. Prosecutors estimated its market value at ₽138 million (about $1.55 million at the time of the case). Dolina listed her apartment for ₽130 million through a real estate agent. Polina Lurie (Полина Лурье), an unsuspecting buyer, visited with a realtor and then spoke to Dolina herself in the apartment. During the conversation, the buyer ultimately negotiated the price of ₽112 million if paid in cash. According to the trial court ruling, the duo signed a preliminary contract in May 2024, when the buyer paid a ₽1 million deposit. The rest was paid as the final contract was signed the next month inside an Alfa-Bank branch. The women gave the money to a safe deposit box, from which Dolina later withdrew the cash.

In August 2024, the singer declared that she fell victim to fraudsters. According to Dolina, in April, scammers posing as officers of Rosfinmonitoring (a governmental agency combatting financial crime) and the Federal Security Service (FSB) convinced her that criminals wanted to steal her money and take out a mortgage on her apartment. They pressured her to hand over her apartment but assured that the deed would be "a fiction" and that it was monitored by the security services. They also urged to transfer her funds to "safe accounts" and not to tell anyone about her "involvement" with law enforcement. Dolina then gave fraudsters a total of ₽175 million, which included money from the apartment sale, her own savings, and even money borrowed from friends. BBC News Russian speculated that Dolina was probably the unnamed biggest fraud victim of 2024, according to the Ministry of Internal Affairs data, as the amount of money in that announcement was roughly the same as in this case.

The singer realized she was swindled out of millions of rubles after the scammers claimed that criminals apparently took out another loan with a different property as collateral, and after she reportedly saw "five sturdy guys" trying to repossess the apartment. Dolina was supposed to hand over the keys in July. However, she first told the buyer that she was on a concert tour, then stopped replying to Lurie's calls and messages, and ultimately refused to move out. The singer sued to recover the apartment from Lurie; Lurie counter-sued to evict the former owner.

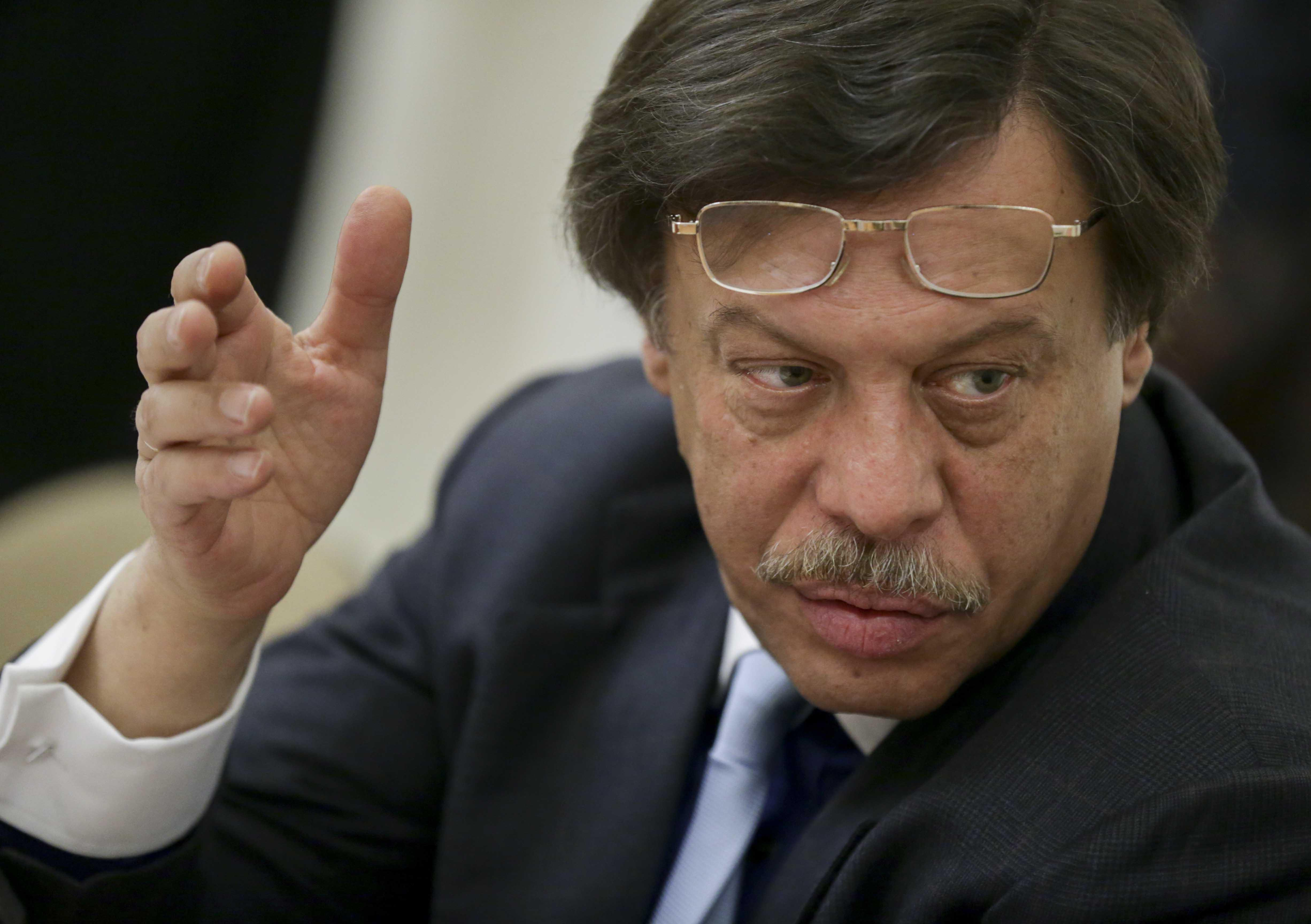
Mikhail Barshchevsky, a top lawyer for the government of Russia, (Note: His position is equivalent to that of the solicitor general in English-speaking nations) served as lead counsel for Dolina.

=== Civil lawsuit ===
Article 178 of the Russian Civil Code allows deals to be declared null and void if a party fell victim to deception while signing the agreement and would not have done that had they known about the true state of affairs. Attorneys for Lurie argued the court should not do that as there were no issues apparent during negotiation and the plaintiff seemed to behave appropriately. According to lawyer Natalia Sivonina, uninvolved in the case, it was also reasonable for Lurie to rely on the singer's public fame and her status as a trusted person for President Vladimir Putin's electoral campaigns.

Counsel for Dolina disagreed and believed that the singer was, in fact, deceived. They also suggested that Lurie did not do her due diligence when buying the property, as the low price did not raise red flags for her and she did not ask for a health report from a psychiatrist. (Note: In Russia, the seller is often asked to show a psychiatrist's report to ensure that they are not impaired when performing the deal. This is done to safeguard against the possibility of a court ruling voiding a deal due to the seller's mental issues that prevented them from understanding what they were signing, even if they are not otherwise incapacitated (article 177 of the Civil Code). No law requires the seller to show the report, and in fact only a court-appointed expert witness may legally establish incompetency to enter into contract, but refusing to do so upon request is considered suspicious. Elderly people in particular are essentially required to present a psychiatric report.) A report by a court-appointed expert witness in the parallel criminal trial found that the singer was "mentally unstable" at the time of the deal. She refused a similar evaluation for the civil trial.

In March 2025, the district court in Khamovniki agreed with the plaintiff and ordered the property returned. However, the court reasoned that Lurie was not eligible for restitution because it could not "definitively establish the pecuniary character of the deal". It suggested that she could sue the scammers instead (even though she likely wouldn't qualify as a victim of fraud). Appeals to the Moscow City Court (September 2025) and the Second Cassational Court (November 2025) affirmed the ruling. This would have left Lurie with no money, no apartment and a bleak prospect of recovering losses.

Dolina broke the silence around the case on air of the popular Let Them Talk talk show (5 December), long after the popular backlash started and after the second appeal came in her favour. The star promised to return the money to the buyer but admitted she didn't have any at that moment. The lawyer for Lurie dismissed the celebrity's proposal to pay out the loan in installments stretching over three years, without accounting for interest or other expenses, as unacceptably one-sided.

The cassation hearing at Supreme Court of Russia was happening amid heightened interest in the case. Dozens of journalists crowded the chambers. The livestream of the proceedings attracted 523,000 views—the most in the history of the Supreme Court. Lurie won the case, meaning that the deed was found to be valid and she legally became the owner of the apartment. The Supreme Court explained that Dolina was aware about the core purpose of the deal—change of ownership. However, being confused about the purpose of the deal or its legal consequences was not reason enough to overturn the acquisition. The top court also rejected Dolina's argument that the deal should be overturned based on her diminished mental capacity because she did not satisfy the burden of proof required to show it. For this to happen, a court-appointed expert witness had to conduct a separate evaluation for her civil trial, which she had refused. The criminal trial's expert examination was not applicable.

On remand, the Moscow City Court granted the buyer's request to evict Dolina effective immediately (25 December). Lawyers for both sides offered contradictory information on the scope of accommodations that Dolina requested before moving out. Delays caused Lurie's counsel to file paperwork for summoning bailiffs to enforce the eviction ruling. On 19 January 2026, bailiffs witnessed the keys being handed over to the lawyer of the recognised owner of the apartment, apparently ending the matter.

=== Criminal trial ===
Prosecutors indicted four suspects in relation to the crime. All pled not guilty to grand fraud charges and denied knowing that the funds were used for illicit purposes. Angela Tsyryulnikova, one of the defendants who was also implicated in several similar scams in the Moscow metropolitan area, took the money bag from Dolina, but claimed she was not aware of its contents. She also stated that by doing what she did, she unwittingly acted in another criminal enterprise. In November 2025, a trial court in the Moscow suburb of Balashikha sentenced all defendants to four to seven years of corrective colony and fines of ₽900,000 to ₽1 million. The court found that Tsyryulnikova exchanged the money she took for Tether cryptocurrency, while three other defendants held the "safe accounts" that Dolina transferred the money to and cashed out some of the funds. The singer asked the scammers to return the money she paid them, but the court declined to review the motion.

== Outline of Dolina-style scams ==
Dolina's case increased awareness of loopholes that scammers may exploit to defraud property buyers.

- One possibility under Russian law is the one that Dolina used—restitution by voiding the deal as fraudulent. Typically, this means the buyer returns the property and the seller gives back the money. However, in the filing, the plaintiff lies to the court that they were themselves conned out of the funds that they are supposed to return, so they get back the property while keeping the money. As a variation of this scheme, the seller may not be a criminal but, when faced with a lawsuit seeking to reverse the transaction, they instead declare bankruptcy. The money is also gone in this case.
- Another possibility involves a rei vindicatio lawsuit. In this scam, there are two co-conspirators—the original owner (Alice) and the last seller (Bob). Alice sells their real estate (possibly through other intermediaries) to Bob, and Bob then sells it to an uninvolved Charlie. Alice then files a lawsuit alleging that the first transaction was fraudulent as the property was stolen or taken by deception. The court then voids the initial contract, meaning that Alice regains the real estate while Bob has the money from the last sale.

The scheme additionally exploits three factors. The first is the fact that Russian courts treat pensioners more favourably due to the general opinion of them as a vulnerable social group. Thus the schemes disproportionately employ elderly people, who may or may not be accomplices. They coach the pensioners to not appear weird in front of realtors and notaries and to confirm their story when appropriate. Judicial practice was also favourable to the elderly, as restitution was often ordered in one way only—the property would return to the original owner but the money stayed. In fact, Dolina's case is far from isolated and not the first one. Several analyses cited over a dozen verdicts in total in which unsuspecting buyers paid for apartments which were taken away by court rulings, but the courts then did not order compensation. Vedomosti calculated that Russians lost at least 433 million rubles in 2025 alone due to the scam, out of an estimated total of over 8 billion rubles lost due to unauthorised apartment sales.

Secondly, the law prioritises reflecting the will of the seller over the extent of the buyer's due diligence. For example, if the court overturns the deal, it may explain that while the seller did show on paper that they intended to sell the apartment, they were unlikely to really want to sell their only apartment. Courts also tend to trust the "tricked" seller's testimony more than that of the buyer. Sivonina said that the principle of good-faith buyer (article 302 of the Civil Code) does not apply in cases when there is no dispute about the previous owner of the property. In Dolina's case, it might have applied to whomever Lurie would sell the apartment afterwards, but never to Lurie herself. Therefore, buyers are unlikely to easily recover the money or the apartment once the "fraudulent acquisition" case goes to court. Recording the deal on video, certifying the deal at the notary office and ensuring that the psychiatric report does not show issues is not likely to prevent the scam.

Finally, if the buyer does not do due diligence, courts will not generally reverse the transaction, even if (and possibly particularly if) the seller's conduct is suspect—such as selling their property without having another place to live, urging to buy the property as fast as possible and/or selling it for an unusually low price.

There is disagreement over the frequency of these unfavourable outcomes. Daniil Filippov, a senior officer at the Ministry of Internal Affairs, said that about 2/5 of court cases ended up with courts ordering a one-way restitution of apartments, as opposed to another 2/5 where the court ordered to return to the status quo and the rest of cases when courts did not find the deals fraudulent. Lawyer Maksim Dotsenko suggested that while there was an increase of plaintiffs' actions, under 10% of 349 lawsuits seeking to void the deed as fraudulent were resolved by ordering "one-sided" restitution. Izvestia cited court data suggesting that the number of plaintiff actions significantly decreased from 2024 levels in the lead-up to the case.

== Consequences ==
The case became a hot topic for Russians after the ruling of the Moscow City Court. The notoriety of this case disrupted the secondary real estate market in the country because the scheme by its nature undermines the presumption that deals have consequences. According to a survey by VTsIOM, a state-run pollster, 62% of Russians who planned to buy an apartment were afraid of being left penniless due to being victims of fraud. Another survey by the same pollster found that two-thirds of Russians did not support the trial court ruling, with younger people more opposed to the decision.

There is agreement that the publicity around this case increased the number of plaintiffs' actions to void the deeds. Delovoy Peterburg quoted real estate agents as saying that trust in elderly (over-50) sellers collapsed even if younger owners were also used in the scams. Slava, a fellow singer, complained that she was unable to sell her apartment because people became too suspicious of celebrities. On the other hand, other Russian pop stars, including Philipp Kirkorov, Vladimir Presnyakov Jr. and Zara, supported Dolina. Kirkorov in particular expressed the opinion that the "trampling on a celebrity is people's favourite pastime" but it should stop.

Clients took extra precautions when dealing with the newly suspect categories, such as requiring the presence of relatives or of a psychiatrist. The sellers became increasingly scrutinised. More buyers were intensively questioning the owners' words and forcing clauses stating that they were not doing things that are associated with scammers' stories. They were also requiring not just the information that they are not being treated for mental disorders, but a comprehensive mental health report. Lawyers retained by buyers reported that their clients, likely influenced by media content exaggerating the scale of the issue, suddenly grew more paranoid. Attorneys also said that they needed to spend significantly more time to calm them down and to explain every single clause of the deed. Some media personalities even circulated a conspiracy theory suggesting that the whole controversy was orchestrated by property developers to increase sales of new apartments. To a lesser extent, the scam also spread to used car sales, which disturbed potential buyers of vehicles. At least one Dolina-style scam allegedly happened in Belarus.

The case did not cause much disruption to the volume of transactions in the secondary market. Delovoy Peterburg and Izvestia noted an uptick of visits to notaries in Saint Petersburg. Banks also did not report much disturbance in the mortgage market.

=== Legislative efforts ===
Several changes to the law were floated as a proposed to combat the scam. One, floated by A Just Russia party leader Sergey Mironov, proposes a so-called "cooldown period" of seven days between signing the deed and registering the property at Rosreestr, the agency behind the state registry of real estate ownership. The new bill proposes that the formal switch of ownership would only happen after the money changes hands. The draft law would also ban cash deals in real estate and require that the seller offer a notary-certified declaration that they have another place to live. As of early December 2025, State Duma started debating the bill. Another draft bill proposed introducing a new requirement for seller plaintiffs during court cases involving allegedly fraudulent transactions. They would have to prove that the buyer knew about efforts to deceive the seller.

The Duma also created a parliamentary working group aiming to protect good-faith buyers from seller's shenanigans, to which Dolina was invited. The office of the Prosecutor General suggested targeting "suspicious" transactions with the cooldown. Rosreestr itself proposed another safety mechanism, which suggests that the seller must first return the money before asking to get back the property.

=== Dolina's reputation ===
Dolina's case caused public uproar against the singer, even though she was not in on the scam. The general public's perception was that she used her wealth and connections to prevail over Lurie, who was perceived as innocent in the matter. Indeed, a poll of 32,000 people by Lenta.ru suggested that Russians overwhelmingly disapproved of Dolina's behaviour. Out of 1.1 million mentions of Dolina in the media in the press and social media in November, most were negative—and the criticism skyrocketed by the end of the month as the case's public notoriety spread. Maria Zakharova, spokeswoman for the Ministry of Foreign Affairs, accused "Russia's enemies" of using the scandal in their hybrid warfare efforts to pit Russians against each other.

Novaya Gazeta published an article suggesting that the Dolina's case was an "ideal trigger" for the general population due to the combination of three factors: the presence of a privileged "rich star" who becomes a natural scapegoat because she is seen as more powerful; the relatable concept of searching an apartment on the secondary market, only to lose it; and the background fear and distrust of the government and the real estate market. It also didn't help that Dolina's public behaviour, according to the newspaper, was often arrogant. An op-ed by Mikhail Zygar suggested that an additional factor was that the matter was not obviously related to politics, so Russians, otherwise used to suppressing their disagreements with the government for fear of prosecution, felt they were free to protest the injustice. Forbes Russia cited public relations specialists as saying that Dolina's controversy was more personal to an average Russian than those of other celebrities because it revolved around their own property and not just public morality issues. The response to the outcry, according to these people, was a "complete failure of crisis communication", and her interview on Let Them Talk may have exacerbated the problem due to the appearance of lacking empathy to other victims of the scam. Such was the outcry against her actions that The Bell called her "the most hated woman in Russia".

Many users took to the social media to express their disgust, to the point that it became an online lynch mob. Counsel for the singer filed a criminal complaint due to death threats targeted at her. A new trend started on social media ridiculing the ruling by arguing that courts should finance non-essential or outright extravagant expenditures because the owner "was acting under the influence of fraudsters" when selling their apartment. Some Internet users christened Dolina as a "granny zero" case (by analogy with patient zero); others started recalling Dolina's older controversies, such as an excerpt from a talk show in which she claims that the police do not pull her over because she has a "special document". Muscovites started bringing joke talismans (slippers, candles, keys and satirical notes) to the apartment in Khamovniki. Dolina's media representative criticised the uproar against the singer as "chasing for likes".

Dolina saw several instances of what could be termed cancel culture applied to her. Stoloto, the largest distributor of Russian state lotteries, deleted the Telegram post that featured her performance in a real estate sweepstake ad after backlash from Internet users and a "bot attack". The Pushkin Café, an upscale restaurant on Moscow's main street, Tverskaya, deleted mentions about the New Year's Eve concert she was scheduled to give; another concert that would commemorate the singer's 70th anniversary was also cancelled. Other concerts saw a surge of people returning their tickets. Several other companies declared they would stop servicing Dolina on their premises. While her producer earlier claimed that she suffered no revenue losses from the scandal, according to an estimate of Nikita Prokhorov, CEO of a public relations company, Dolina was set to lose over ₽300 million of annual income. For example, the organisation with ties to Larisa Dolina's daughter, Angelina, failed to secure a presidential grant worth ₽76 million that was meant to help develop a talent agency for new entrants at the Russian pop scene.

==== Linguistic developments ====
Valeriy Yefremov, a researcher at the Institute for Linguistic Studies who specialises in neologisms, traced back the development of new words related to Dolina's case back to summer 2024 (as "Dolina scheme"). "Dolina effect" appeared in December 2024, followed by "babushka scheme" (summer 2025), "case of Dolina" (fall 2025) and, in December of that year, "babushka variation", in reference to the real estate fraud. TASS, the Russian state-owned news agency, cited search query data at Yandex that suggested a spike in interest in July 2025 and then in October of that year.

Natalia Kozlovskaya, head of the Russian language academic department at Herzen University opined that the word will probably not stay relevant after the scandal goes down. Forbes Russia, on the other hand, cited the founder of a public relations agency as saying that the word will, in fact, stay relevant and will have a similar prominence to expressions like Streisand effect.
