= 2007 Russian legislative election =

- 2 December 2007

All 450 seats to the State Duma 226 seats needed for a majority
- Turnout: 63.71% (▲8.01 pp)
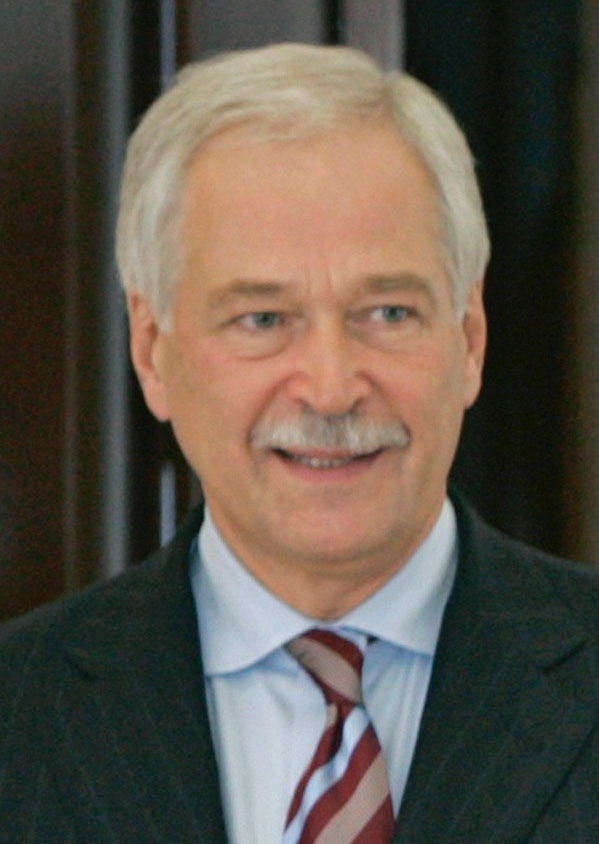

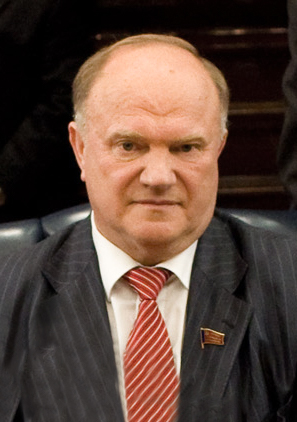

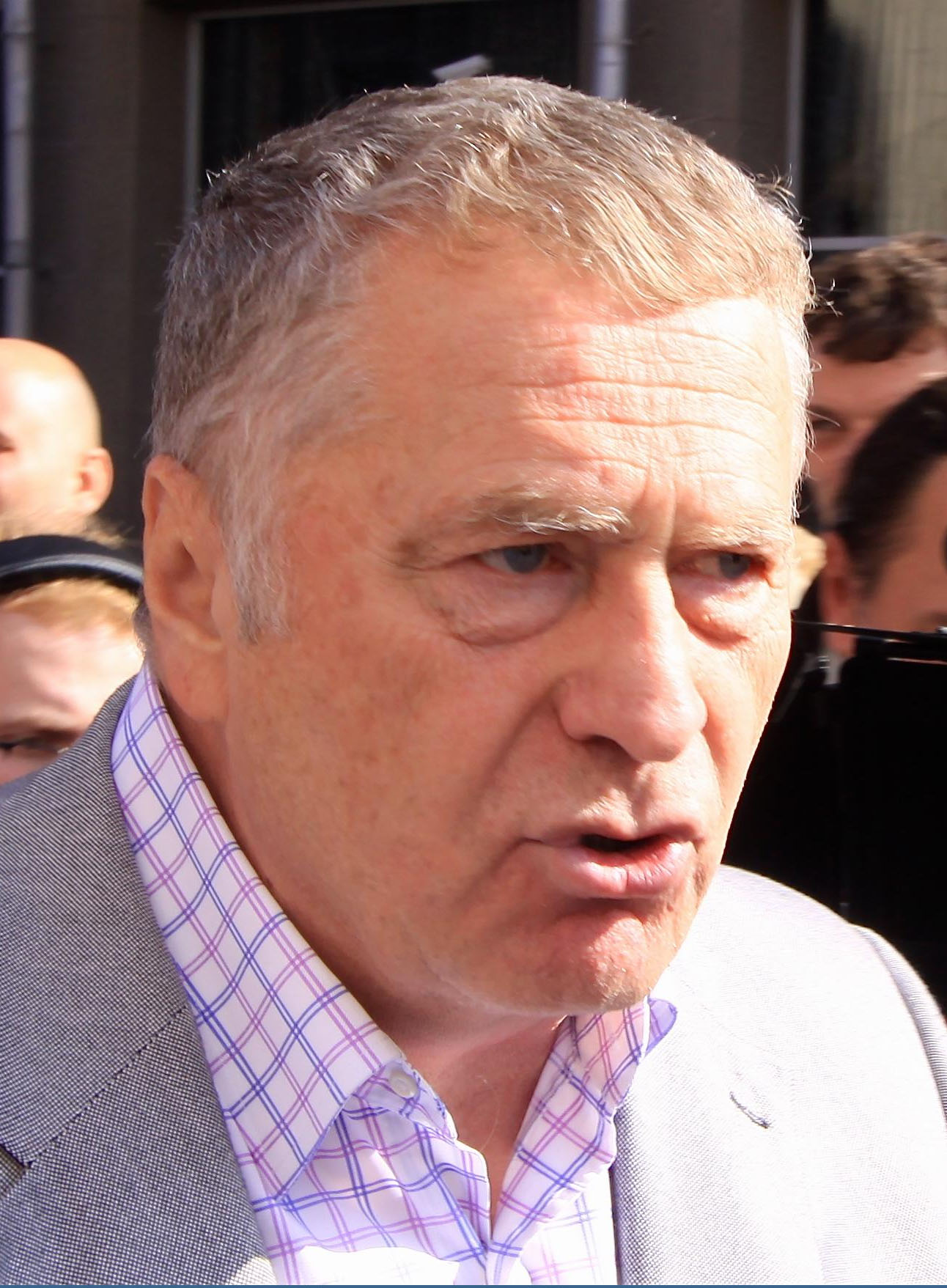

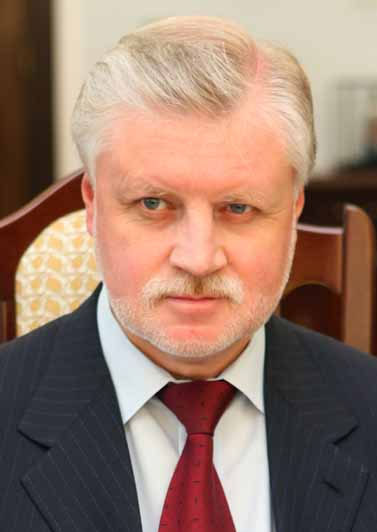
	Majority party	Minority party
Leader	Boris Gryzlov	Gennady Zyuganov
Party	United Russia	CPRF
Last election	223 seats, 37.57%	52 seats, 12.61%
Seats won	315	57
Seat change	▲92	▲5
Popular vote	44,714,241	8,046,886
Percentage	64.30%	11.57%
Swing	▲26.73pp	▼1.04pp
	Third party	Fourth party
Leader	Vladimir Zhirinovsky	Sergey Mironov
Party	LDPR	A Just Russia
Last election	36 seats, 11.45%	New
Seats won	40	38
Seat change	▲4	▲38
Popular vote	5,660,823	5,383,639
Percentage	8.14%	7.74%
Swing	▼3.31pp	New
Chairman before election
Boris Gryzlov
United Russia
Elected Chairman
Boris Gryzlov
United Russia

Legislative elections were held in Russia on 2 December 2007. At stake were the 450 seats in the 5th State Duma, the lower house of the Federal Assembly (the legislature). Eleven parties were included in the ballot, including Russia's largest party, United Russia, which was supported by President of Russia Vladimir Putin. Official results showed that United Russia won 64.3% of the votes, the Communist Party of the Russian Federation 11.6%, the Liberal Democratic Party of Russia 8.1%, and A Just Russia won 7.7%, and none of the other parties won enough votes to gain any seats.

Although 400 foreign election monitors were present at the polling stations, the elections received mixed criticism internationally, largely from Western countries, and by some independent media and some opposition parties domestically. The observers stated that the elections were not rigged but that media coverage was heavily favoured towards United Russia. The Organization for Security and Co-operation in Europe and Parliamentary Assembly of the Council of Europe stated that the elections were "not fair", while foreign governments and the European Union called on Russia to look for possible violations. The election commission responded saying that the allegations would be examined. The Kremlin insisted that the vote was fair and said it demonstrated Russia's political stability.

== Electoral system ==
The 2007 election were assigned exclusively from party-list proportional representation under a law adopted in 2005 on the initiative of President Vladimir Putin. He claimed it would strengthen the party system by reducing the number of parties in the Duma. In the previous elections half of the seats were filled using proportional representation and another half using the first-past-the-post system. It was also the first parliamentary election since 1993 that lacks the "against all" option on the ballot, and the first in which there was no provision for the minimum number of voters that must be achieved for the elections to be considered valid.

That year, the 225 single-member districts were abolished. In the election of 2003, 100 of these seats were won by independents or minor party candidates. All seats were awarded by proportional representation. The threshold for eligibility to win seats was raised from 5.0 to 7.0 percent. In 2003 four parties each exceeded 7.0 percent of the list vote and collectively won 70.7 percent of the total Duma vote.

Only officially registered parties were eligible to compete, and registered parties could not form a bloc in order to improve their chances of clearing the 7.0 percent threshold, with the provision that parties in the Duma had to represent at least 60% of the participating citizens, and that there must be at least two parties in the Duma. There were eleven parties eligible to take part in the Duma election. Duma seats were allocated to individuals on the lists of successful parties in accordance with their ranking there, and divided among each regional group of candidates for the party in proportion to the votes received by that party in each region (Article 83: Methodology of Proportional Distribution of Deputy Seats). Any members who resign from their party automatically forfeit their seats.

Several weeks ahead of the election, party leaders take part in moderated debates. Debates are televised on several state channels. Each candidate were given a chance to present his party's agenda, and to challenge opponents with questions. (United Russia refused to participate in the debates to receive more time for allowed promotion clips than other parties.)

In the Republic of Chechnya, a constitutional referendum was held on the same date.

== Contesting parties ==
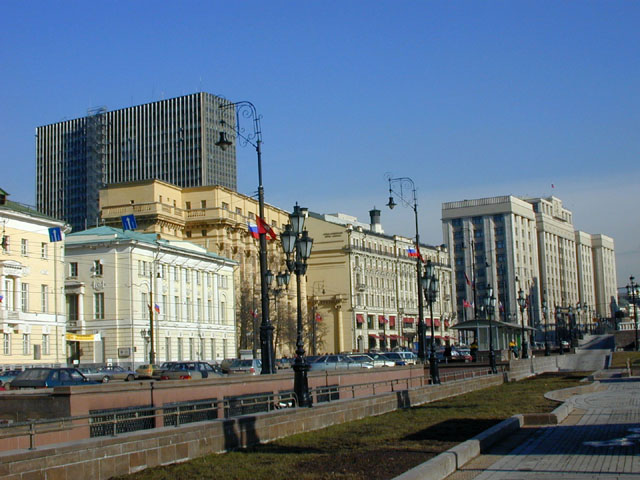
The State Duma (far right), housed near Manege Square

Fifteen parties were eligible to participate in the elections. On 13 September 2007, Patriots of Russia and Party of Russia's Rebirth created a coalition, leaving only 14 parties to participate. All 14 parties have presented their lists of candidates to the Central Election commission. However, the Electoral Commission decided the Russian Ecological Party "The Greens" would not be able to stand, due to an alleged large number of faked signatures (17%, more than the allowed 5%) in their supporters' lists. Nationalist People's Union decided to endorse the Communist Party.

Included in final ballots were:

No.	Party	Abbr.	Lead candidates	Political position	Ideology
1	Agrarian Party of Russia	APR	Vladimir Plotnikov • Nina Brusnikova • Vasily Shandybin	Centre to centre-left	Agrarianism / Centrism
2	Civilian Power	GS	Mikhail Barshchevsky • Alexander Ryavkin • Viktor Pokhmelkin	Centre to centre-right	Liberalism
3	Democratic Party of Russia	DPR	Andrey Bogdanov • Vyacheslav Smirnov • Oleg Gimazov	Centre-right	Liberalism / Pro-Europeanism
4	Communist Party of the Russian Federation	CPRF	Gennady Zyuganov • Zhores Alferov • Nikolay Kharitonov	Left-wing	Socialism / Left-wing conservatism
5	Union of Right Forces	SPS	Nikita Belykh • Boris Nemtsov • Marietta Chudakova	Centre-right	Conservative liberalism / Economic liberalism
6	Party of Social Justice	PSS	Alexey Podberezkin • Maksim Leskov • Valery Vorotnikov	Center-left	Democratic socialism
7	Liberal Democratic Party of Russia	LDPR	Vladimir Zhirinovsky • Andrey Lugovoy • Igor Lebedev	Right-wing	Right-wing populism / Unitarism / Anti-communism
8	A Just Russia: Motherland / Pensioners / Life	SR	Sergey Mironov • Svetlana Goryacheva	Centre-left	Social democracy / Left-wing populism
9	Patriots of Russia	PoR	Gennady Semigin • Gennadiy Seleznyov • Sergey Makhovikov	Left-wing	Democratic socialism / Left-wing nationalism
10	United Russia	UR	Vladimir Putin	Centre-right	Statism / Social conservatism
11	Russian United Democratic Party "Yabloko"	Yabloko	Grigory Yavlinsky • Sergey Kovalyov • Sergey Ivanenko	Centre to centre-left	Social liberalism / Social democracy

A number of parties contested the election. The biggest and most popular party in Russia is United Russia, which supports the policies of Vladimir Putin. On 1 October 2007, Putin announced he would run first place on the United Russia list and that he might consider becoming Prime Minister after the elections. Other pro-Kremlin parties crossing the seven percent threshold include the new A Just Russia party, led by the Speaker of the Federation Council of Russia Sergey Mironov, and the Liberal Democratic Party of Russia (whose candidates included Andrey Lugovoy, wanted in the UK for the murder of Alexander Litvinenko and elected), which has also been favourable towards President Putin's policies.

The largest opposition party is the Communist Party of the Russian Federation, which saw its share of the vote cut in half between 1999 and 2003. It came in second with over 11% of the vote, however. The liberal democratic opposition was represented by the free-market Union of Right Forces, the more socially minded Yabloko, and Civilian Power representing right liberal ideology, none of which won any seats.

== Conduct ==
The Organization for Security and Co-operation in Europe (OSCE) planned to send a large team of election monitors to Russia for the election, but scuttled the plans after accusing Moscow of imposing curbs and delaying monitors' visas (Russian officials denied the claim). Consequently, only 400 foreign monitors from international organisations (330 of them from OSCE) were on hand to observe at some of Russia's 95,000 polling stations.

Observers of the Shanghai Cooperation Organisation (China, Kazakhstan, Kyrgyzstan, Tajikistan and Uzbekistan) inspected 30 precinct election commissions in the electoral district of the city of Moscow. The statement issued by the mission states the election of deputies of the State Duma "in the election district observed by the Mission was legitimate, free and open, and basically conformed to the requirements of the national legislation of the Russian Federation and its international obligations."

== Campaign ==
The campaign season was permitted by law to begin on 3 November and end on 30 November. All the parties were provided with some free television and print access, and on-air candidate debates at times appeared informative.

=== United Russia ===
On 1 October 2007 President Putin announced at the convention of the United Russia party that he would "accept" its invitation to head its list of candidates, although he declined to join the party. In his acceptance speech, Putin stated that a suggestion by a previous speaker that he become the prime minister after his second term as president ends "is entirely realistic, but it is too soon to talk about this at the moment because at least two conditions would first need to be met. United Russia declined to participate in any broadcast political debates, but on 1 October approved the program that pledged to continue Putin's policy course." The election programme was entitled "Putin's Plan: a worthy future for a great country". The United Russia stressed Russian nationalism and an anti-Western image.

== Opinion polls ==
Polling firm	Fieldwork date	United Russia	CPRF	LDPR	Rodina	RPP	RPZh	APR	SPS	Yabloko	Other	Unsure	Against all (Note: "Against all" line was removed from Russian election ballots in 2006.)	Wouldn't vote
Polling firm	Fieldwork date	United Russia	CPRF	LDPR	A Just Russia			APR	SPS	Yabloko	Other	Unsure	Against all	Wouldn't vote
Election result	7 Dec 2003	37.56	12.61	11.45	9.02	3.09 (Note: In electoral alliance with the Party of Social Justice.)	1.88 (Note: In electoral alliance with the Party of Russia's Rebirth.)	3.63	3.97	4.30	—N/a	—N/a	4.70	—N/a
FOM	13–14 Dec 2003	34	8	10	7	2	1	2	3	3	2 (Note: NPRF 1%, KPE 1%.)	10	6	11
FOM	23–28 Dec 2003	30	8	10	6	2	0	2	3	3	0	13	8	15
FOM	10–11 Jan 2004	29	8	9	5	1	1	2	2	3	0	16	6	16
	14 Mar 2004	2004 Russian presidential election												
	1 Jul 2004	Group of CPRF members led by Gennady Semigin attempts to remove its chairman Zyuganov.												
FOM	10–11 Jul 2004	26	11	5	3	—N/a	—N/a	1	2	2	1	19	9	22
	Dec 2004	State Duma switches to full party-list proportional representation starting with 2007 election.												
VCIOM	11–12 Dec 2004	31	7	7	7	2	—N/a	2	2	3	—N/a	—N/a	—N/a	—N/a
Levada	Dec 2004	24	10	7	7	3	—N/a	—N/a	2	1	3	11	7	22
FOM	15–16 Jan 2005	22	9	6	3	—N/a	—N/a	1	1	2	1	25	8	22
VCIOM	29–30 Jan 2005	31	10	7	7	4	—N/a	2	1	3	—N/a	—N/a	—N/a	—N/a
Levada	18–21 Mar 2005	20	10	5	2	—N/a	0.4	0.7	2	2	5.4 (Note: Our Choice 1%, For A Decent Life (split from Rodina) 1%, Republican Party 0.7%, Committee of Soldiers' Mothers 0.5%, Greens 0.3%, PVR 0.3%, NPRF 0.2%, NBP 0.2%, Patriots of Russia 0.1%, Development of Enterprise 0.1%, other 1%.)	22	6	26
FOM	9–10 Jul 2005	21	8	5	3	1	—N/a	1	1	1	1	24	8	24
FOM	14–15 Jan 2006	27	9	6	3	2	—N/a	1	1	2	1	24	6	19
Levada	10–14 Mar 2006	23	9	8	4	1	1	1	1	2	2	28	5	14
FOM	15–16 Jul 2006	26	10	5	2	2	0	1	1	1	1	27	—N/a	23
	28 Oct 2006	Rodina, Party of Pensioners and Party of Life merge to form A Just Russia.												
FOM	25–26 Nov 2006	28	7	4	4			1	1	1	1	30	—N/a	22
FOM	2–3 Dec 2006	27	6	5	3			1	1	1	1	31	—N/a	22
FOM	13–14 Jan 2007	27	6	5	3			1	1	1	1	29	—N/a	25
FOM	24–25 Feb 2007	30	6	6	4			1	1	1	1	28	—N/a	23
	11 Mar 2007	Legislative elections in 14 regions: United Russia holds majority in 13, A Just Russia wins 1.												
FOM	26–27 May 2007	32	6	4	4			1	1	1	1	26	—N/a	23
VCIOM	25–26 Aug 2007	47.7	6.7	5.3	5.0			0.6	0.8	0.8	1.8	15.7	—N/a	15.6
FOM	25–26 Aug 2007	32	6	5	4			1	1	1	1	25	—N/a	24
VCIOM	15–16 Sep 2007	48	7	4	6			1	1	1	1	16	—N/a	15
VCIOM	22–23 Sep 2007	47	7	5	6			1	1	1	1	16	—N/a	15
FOM	22–23 Sep 2007	39	7	6	4			1	1	1	1	21	—N/a	17
VCIOM	29–30 Sep 2007	48	7	5	4			1	1	1	0	17	—N/a	15
	1 Oct 2007	Vladimir Putin declared No. 1 candidate on United Russia's list.												
VCIOM	6–7 Oct 2007	54	6	5	3			1	1	1	0	15	—N/a	13
VCIOM	13–14 Oct 2007	56	6	4	3			1	1	1	0	14	—N/a	13
FOM	20–21 Oct 2007	43	7	6	5			1	1	1	0	20	—N/a	15
VCIOM	27–28 Oct 2007	53.6	7.3	3.9	3.8			1.6	1.1	1.2	1.4	12.5	—N/a	13.7
FOM	10–11 Nov 2007	42	7	6	4			1	1	1	1	21	—N/a	15
VCIOM	17–18 Nov 2007	55.6	5.8	4.8	4.9			1.3	0.8	1.1	1.5	13.6	—N/a	10.8
FOM	24–25 Nov 2007	50	6	6	4			2	1	1	1	17	—N/a	13

=== Seat predictions ===
Polling firm	Date	UR	CPRF	LDPR	SR
VCIOM	1 Jun 2007	253	87	41	69
VCIOM	25–26 Aug 2007	259	82	41	68
VCIOM	25–26 Aug 2007	257	81	48	64
VCIOM	22–23 Sep 2007	237	89	48	76
VCIOM	27–28 Oct 2007	279	82	40	49
VCIOM	17–18 Nov 2007	313	62	40	35
Election result	2 Dec 2007	315	57	40	38

=== Exit polls ===
Polling firm	UR	CPRF	LDPR	SR	APR	Yabloko	GS	SPS	PR	PSS	DPR
VCIOM	61	11.5	8.8	8.4	2.3	2.8	1	1.6	1.6	0.7	0.2
FOM	62.3	11.8	8.4	8.3	2.7	2.2	0.9	1.3	0.8	0.3	0.2
Election result	65.0	11.7	8.2	7.8	2.3	1.6	1.1	1.0	0.9	0.2	0.1

== Results ==
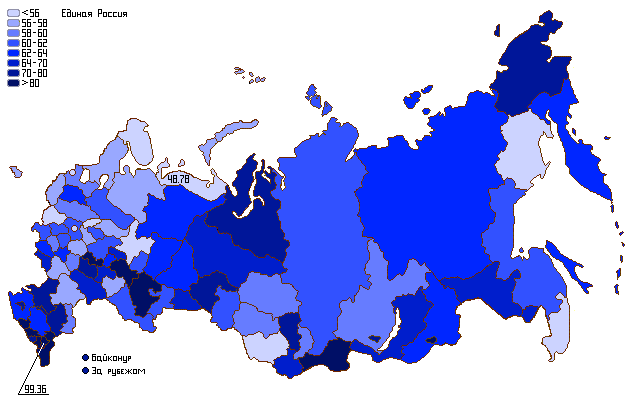
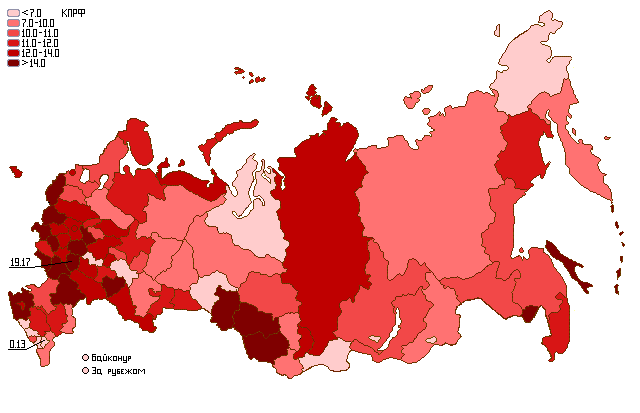
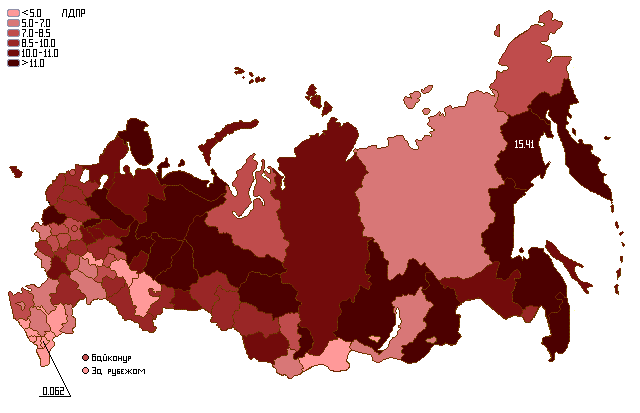
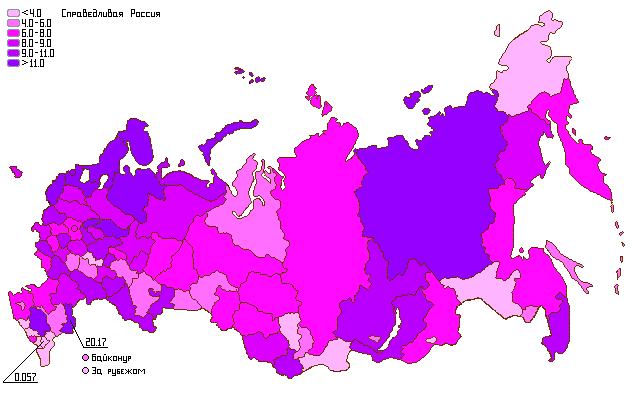
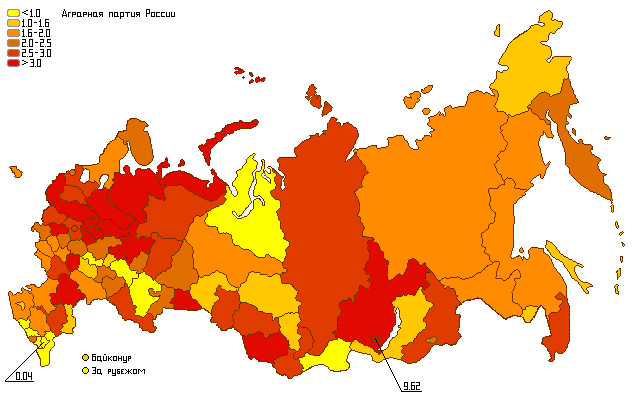
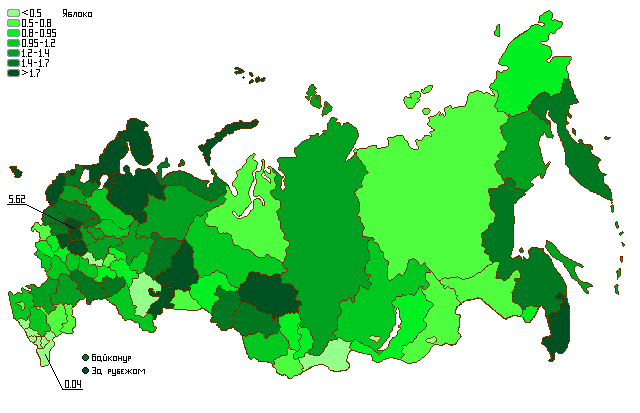
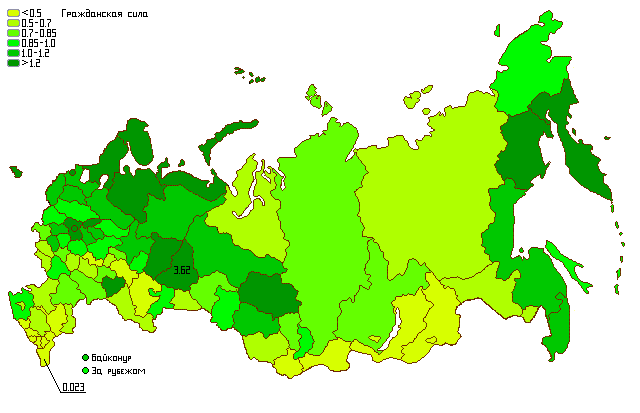
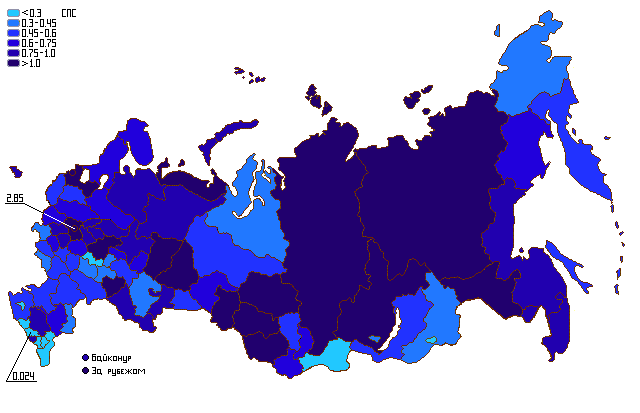
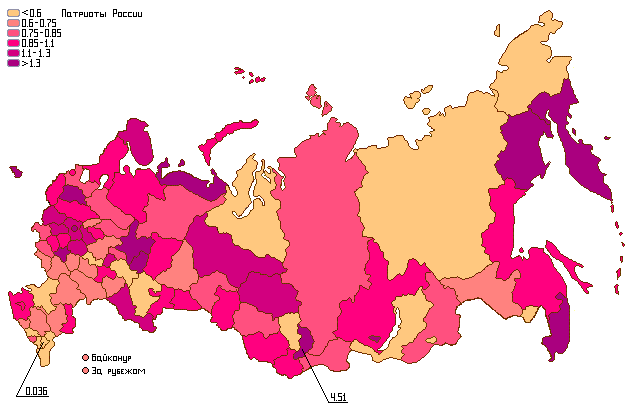
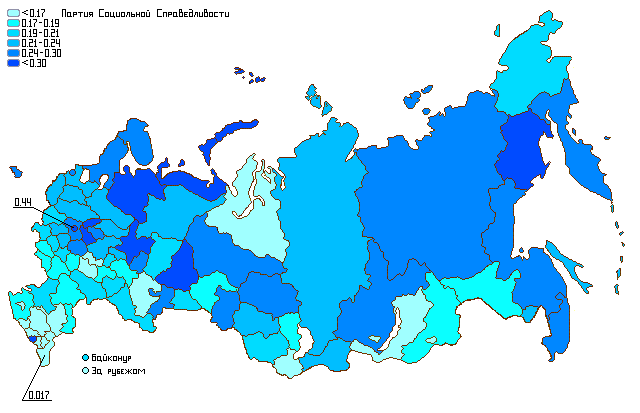
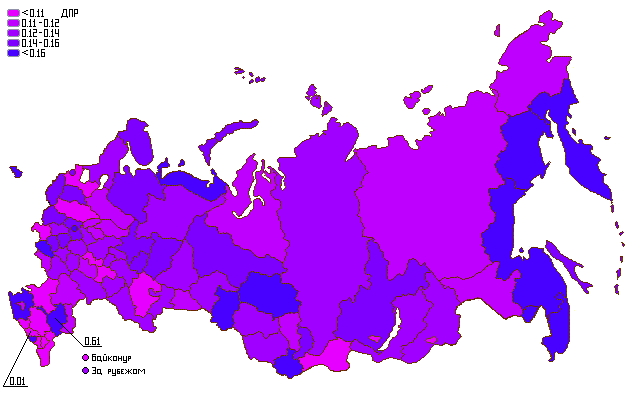
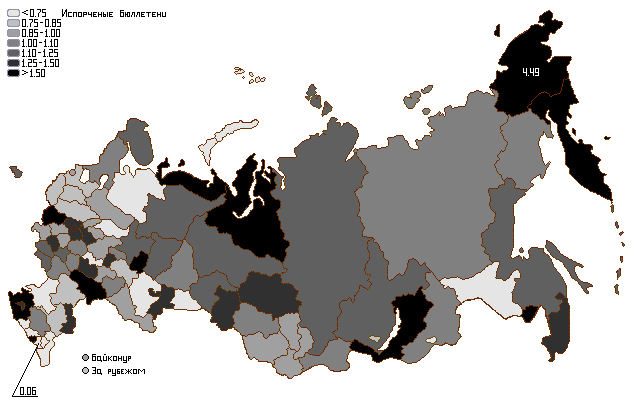
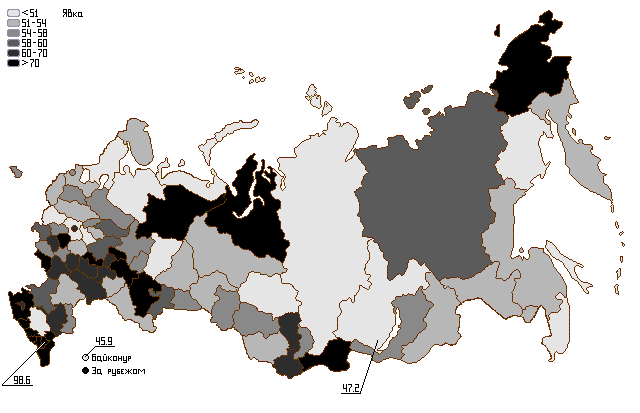

As of 02:00, 3 December Moscow Time about 47.14% votes had been counted. Four parties passed the 7% threshold: United Russia 63.2%, Communist Party of the Russian Federation 11.5%, Liberal Democratic Party of Russia 9.1%, and A Just Russia 7.8%. This was consistent with exit polls conducted by VTsIOM, which predicted 61%, 11.5%, 8.8%, 8.4% respectively. Exit polls conducted by the Public Opinion Foundation showed similar results: 62.3%, 11.8%, 8.4%, 8.3%.

The results mostly repeated those of the previous legislative elections. The ruling centrist party United Russia, leftist Communist Party and nationalist Liberal Democratic Party passed the threshold again; the moderately socialist A Just Russia took the place of Rodina, absorbing many of its members and most of its electorate. United Russia kept its leading position, again receiving a supermajority (more than two-thirds of seats), which gives it an opportunity to make changes to the Constitution of Russia.

Party	Votes	%	Seats	+/–
United Russia	44,714,241	65.01	315	+92
Communist Party	8,046,886	11.70	57	+5
Liberal Democratic	5,660,823	8.23	40	+4
A Just Russia	5,383,639	7.83	38	+1
Agrarian Party	1,600,234	2.33	0	–2
Yabloko	1,108,985	1.61	0	–4
Civilian Power	733,604	1.07	0	0
Union of Right Forces	669,444	0.97	0	–3
Patriots of Russia	615,417	0.89	0	0
Party of Social Justice	154,083	0.22	0	0
Democratic Party	89,780	0.13	0	0
Total	68,777,136	100.00	450	0
Valid votes	68,777,136	98.91		
Invalid/blank votes	759,929	1.09		
Total votes	69,537,065	100.00		
Registered voters/turnout	109,145,517	63.71		
Source: CEC

=== Regional results ===
Although the United Russia became the leading party in each region, in different regions of the Russian Federation, election results vary considerably. While in metropolitan areas of Moscow and Saint Petersburg with 50-55% turnout United Russia got only about 50% of the votes, the national republics, especially in North Caucasus, provided much stronger voter turnout and support for the ruling party.

According to the official results, the highest turnout was in Chechnya at 99.5%, of which 99.36% votes were cast for United Russia; the Chechen pro-Moscow leader Ramzan Kadyrov had publicly promised beforehand to deliver 100 percent of his republic's vote for Putin. In the neighbouring Republic of Ingushetia, where the official results also said around 99 percent of the republic's population had voted and nearly all of them for the pro-Putin party, the elections were preceded by mass protests against the government, and observers suggested that in fact only 8% of people turned out to vote there.

== Criticism ==
=== Domestic criticism ===
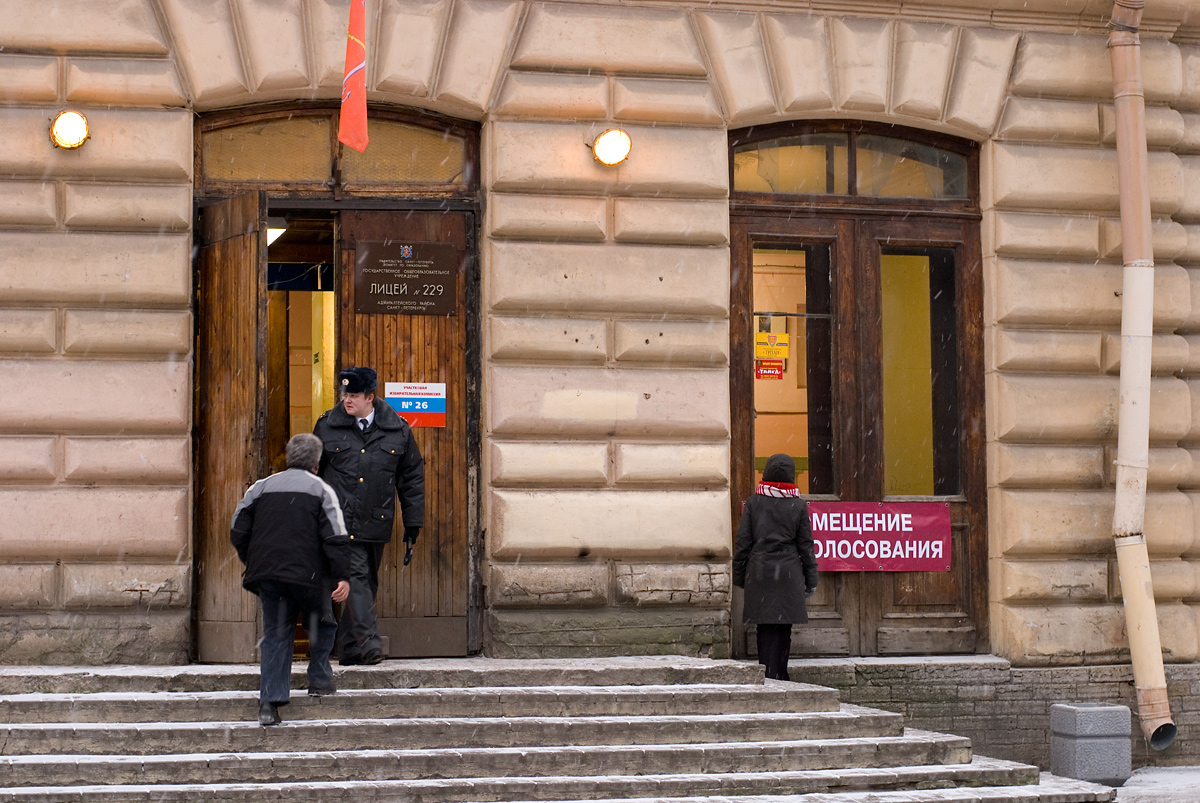
One of the premises for voting in Saint Petersburg

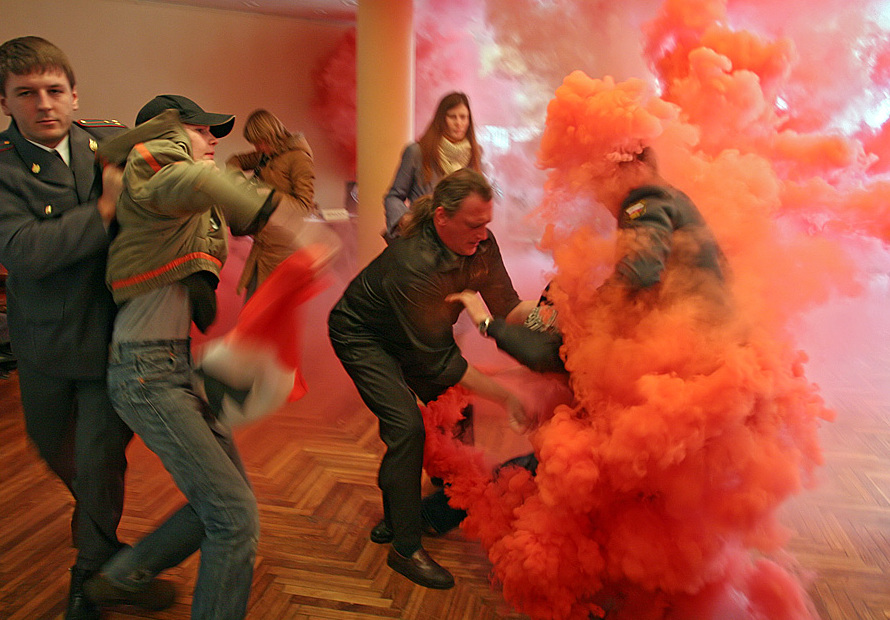
National Bolsheviks attack a polling station in Odintsovo, Moscow Oblast during Russian legislative election, 2007 protesting their ban from the elections

Opposition parties and some independent observers reported widespread abuses, such as strong bias in the Russian media, ballot stuffing, bribery of voters, and coercion of workers and students to vote for United Russia. Nevertheless, critics mostly agree that the United Russia would gain majority even if the election were fair.

Alexander Kynev, a political analyst with the monitoring organisation Golos, said they "have seen a campaign of unprecedented pressure on the voters." Golos said it had received more than 3,000 reports of election abuse on a special hotline. It said various violations during the voting amounted to "an organised campaign". Golos made public an analysis of the 1,329 complaints that were filed during the elections and of the observations of its 2,500 election monitors. According to the report, 23% of all complaints involved officials and police hindering the work of election monitors, 22% involved reports of illegal campaigning, 15% percent involved purported manipulations of the voter lists, 11% percent involved pressure on voters and 9% involved alleged violations of regulations protecting voter privacy.

The Russia's Communist Party said its 300,000 observers identified about 10,000 violations, among them the alleged mass falsification of Duma vote in the Caucasus republic of Dagestan. Communist Party leader Gennady Zyuganov called a news conference to criticize the official results. Journalist Grigory Belonuchkin, delegated as an observer by the CPRF in Moscow Oblast, claims that the chairpersons of several polling stations attempted to forge the results while transmitting them to the above committee, rigging vote count in favor of the United Russia.

Yabloko party leader Grigory Yavlinsky said "The results of this election were not counted, were not analyzed, were not gathered. They were ordered." He also issued a warning to Yabloko supporters: "Be very careful. We are entering a time when, if something happens, there will be nowhere to turn. A one-party system is built in such a way that there is no court, no law, no defense of any kind."

The Communist Party, Yabloko, and the Union of Right Forces are considering filing a joint complaint with the Russian Supreme Court against the official results of the Duma elections. The parties also said they will likely appeal the election results to the European Court of Human Rights, even though a Yabloko-filed case contesting the results of the 2003 elections is still pending there.

Pro-Kremlin Vladimir Zhirinovsky complained of vote-rigging in several regions where his ultranationalist Liberal Democratic Party of Russia did worse than in the rest of the country, but blaming only local authorities. "Just as road accidents cannot be avoided in any country in the world, there are officials who manipulate (elections), who falsify, even though no one has asked them to do it," Zhirinovsky said.

Former world chess champion Garry Kasparov, who heads the opposition movement The Other Russia, has dismissed the elections as a "farce" and "rigged from the start". Kasparov, who spent five days in jail previous week for holding an unauthorised march, said he plans to lay a wreath outside the Central Election Commission to "mourn the death of Russian democracy". Former Prime Minister of Russia Mikhail Kasyanov also said the elections were illegitimate. "There is not doubt that these elections were not free. They were dishonest and unfair. The result is that this Parliament will not be legitimate," he said.

The deputy head of Central Election Commission of Russia, Nikolai Konkin, said "all complaints and allegations will be carefully examined" and pledged to respond in the coming days. Already on 3 December, Kremlin spokesman Dmitri Peskov told CNN the complaints were "groundless". He also said he had no reason to doubt the Chechen result. President Putin himself described the "honest, as transparent as possible and open" election as a "good example of domestic political stability".

In mid-December journalist of The New Times (Russia) Natalia Morar published an article titled "Black Fund of Kremlin" in which she's alleged political parties in Russia being funded from a secret unaccountable fund of the Kremlin. After that Natalia Morar, a citizen of the Republic of Moldova and a permanent resident of Russia, was forbidden to enter the Russian Federation. The International Federation of Journalists called on the European bodies to investigate the case. Russia's Union of Journalists also condemned the deportation.

To protest the official results of the election (according to which 98.4% of registered voters participated in the election, and 99.2% of them voted for the United Russia), voters in the republic of Ingushetia collected written and signed claims from adult people who did not vote, 87,340 as of 10 January 2008. This is 54.5% of the republic's total electorate.

==== Court challenges to the election results ====
On 19 March 2008 the court of town Dolgoprudny, Moscow Oblast started hearings on the falsification of the election results in two districts of town. In particular the plaintiffs, representatives of Communist Party of the Russian Federation, A Just Russia and Yabloko parties allege that the results of the United Russia were artificially increased from 54.4% to 82.4%. According to the plaintiffs the falsification of similar magnitude were registered throughout all eight districts of Dolgoprudny but in most of the other districts the observers managed to prevent the counterfeit reports from getting into the final results. If the allegation will be found to be true the central electoral commission would have to modify the final national results; it also may be the grounds of starting criminal prosecution against the electoral officials of Dolgoprudny with a possible sentence of up to four years of imprisonment.

=== Foreign criticism ===
==== Governments ====
Czech Republic
The Czech Republic said the "election campaign did not conform to democratic standards."

France
France called on Russia to investigate the alleged violations in the poll. President Nicolas Sarkozy telephoned Putin to congratulate him on his victory, which drew protests from rights groups.

Germany
German government said that "Russia was not a democracy and Russia is not a democracy" and called for Russia to embrace multi-party politics. Chancellor of Germany Angela Merkel and Foreign Minister of Germany Frank-Walter Steinmeier both criticised the Russian elections. Ruprecht Polenz, who heads the German parliament's Foreign Affairs Committee, said that the Russian vote was "not what we would call a democratic election" and noted that "we don't know what kind of Russia we'll be dealing with the day after tomorrow." The German government spokesman said: "Measured by our standards, these were not free and fair elections, they were not democratic elections."

Italy
President of the Council of Ministers of Italy Romano Prodi quickly denied the Kremlin's claims that he had called Putin to congratulate him on his party's success.

Portugal
The Government of Portugal said the vote "did not meet international standards and commitments."

United Kingdom
The Foreign and Commonwealth Office said that voting irregularities, "if proven correct, would suggest that the Russian elections were neither free nor fair".

United States
National Security Council and White House spokesman Gordon Johndroe said: "Early reports from Russia include allegations of election day violations. We urge Russian authorities to investigate these claims." President George W. Bush said that he and his administration "were sincere in our expressions of concern about the elections" in the telephone talks with Putin.

==== International institutions ====
According to a joint statement by the Organization for Security and Co-operation in Europe (OSCE) and the Council of Europe, elections on 2 December "were not fair and failed to meet many OSCE and Council of Europe commitments and standards for democratic elections". According to the statement,

In general, the elections were well organised and observers noticed significant technical improvements. However, they took place in an atmosphere which seriously limited political competition and with frequent abuse of administrative resources, media coverage strongly in favour of the ruling party, and an election code whose cumulative effect hindered political pluralism. There was not a level political playing field in Russia in 2007.

As chief of the Parliamentary Assembly of the Council of Europe (PACE) mission Luc Van den Brande said at a news conference in Moscow the elections were not fair, including the "unprecedented" example of a president still in office running in parliamentary elections. Van den Brande said the president and his office had exerted an "overwhelming" influence on the campaign, and also criticized flaws in the secrecy of the vote. "If Russia has managed democracy, then these were managed elections," he said, and warned: "While we are happy that there was the fall of the (Berlin) Wall, we don't want to have a new dividing line in Europe in terms of democracy."

Swedish parliamentarian Goran Lennmarker, who headed the OSCE team, said he was disappointed by the election process and said: "It was not fair election."

Finnish parliamentarian Kimmo Kiljunen, the deputy president of the OSCE Parliamentary Assembly and a member of its election monitoring mission in Russia, questioned the accuracy of the reported Chechen election results in an interview to a Russian radio station, saying that it is "impossible that all voters come and vote for one and the same party." Commenting on his personal experience of observing about 10 polling stations, he said "my general point is that in principle what happened yesterday were normal elections and in technical sense they worked well." He also said, "And there's one specific aspect that is also problematic: the executive branch has made the election so that they almost chose this Parliament [...] And this is a problem. Government forces have been blended with the party base. And it is a very problematic situation that the president will be a candidate for one party, and will not be a member of the council, as well as governors of various regions who were candidates of one party - and will not be members of the Duma. This party political interference, and this is my own opinion, is the big problem. I will say the election was made in a Russian style – I can't say whether democratic or not – I can't analyze it in this aspect". Commenting a statement by the host that "the president had a formal right to head the list of one of the parties" he said "I also think so. You didn't do it against your law. [...] I think the president has the right to be a candidate, the governor has the right to be a candidate - I'm not criticizing it, I just ask - how is this possible?"

Central Election Commission Chairman Vladimir Churov dismissed the criticisms of the Western election monitors as "politically motivated and subjective".

The European Union also voiced its concerns, with European Commissioner for External Relations and European Neighbourhood Policy Benita Ferrero-Waldner stating that they "saw some violations of basic rights, notably free speech and assembly rights." A spokesman for the European Commission said that "we are obviously aware of the allegations of irregularities. These will have to be assessed by the relevant bodies in Russia, and we will monitor this closely." Graham Watson from the European Parliament said the vote proved that President Vladimir Putin is "a populist with the trappings of a dictator.... He is in the same category as Hugo Chávez, only...more dangerous." The final joint EU statement said:

there were many reports and allegations of media restrictions as well as harassment of opposition parties and non-governmental organizations in the run-up to the elections and on election day, and that procedures during the electoral campaign did not meet international standards and commitments voluntarily assumed by Moscow. The EU hopes that investigations will clarify the accuracy of these allegations.

=== Western media criticism and commentary ===
Radio Free Europe/Radio Liberty (RFE/RL) published a detailed report on election day why they considered the elections a show election.

According to British newspaper The Independent, "critics condemned the election as an exercise in phantom democracy. Although voters had a choice of 11 parties, the only ones with a chance of making it into Russia's notoriously feckless Duma are either creations of the Kremlin, or loyal to it" and "Many Russians believe that the loss of freedom has been an acceptable price to pay for the stability."

However, according to Nikolai N. Petro's opinion article in the International Herald Tribune, "Far from indicating a retreat from democracy, the Russian electorate's rejection of the current opposition may be a sign of the country's progress toward a mature democracy."

Norman Stone in The Times guest comment article though admitting that "No doubt there are elements of truth in [the allegations]", wrote "President Putin is popular, and from a Russian perspective, you can easily see why. Indeed, the outcome of his recent election more than slightly resembles General de Gaulle's success in 1958". He concluded on Putin: "if Russians see him as the best hope, they should be understood."

On the other hand, Denmark's daily Politiken, noted that the Russian election "could be best described as a swindle." The paper argued that Western countries should not accept its results "lest they compromise their own democratic values and deprive Russians of hope in a democratic future for their country".

Britain's Financial Times observed that "Russia's relations with the West threatened to hit a new low...as Western leaders and institutions denounced parliamentary elections at the weekend as unfair and undemocratic. But independent observers suggested both sides could seek to contain the damage as Russia heads into a crucial and uncertain period."

In Brussels, NATO Secretary General Jaap de Hoop Scheffer said through his spokesman that he is concerned "about the conduct of the elections, in particular when it comes to freedom of expression and association," but there was no sign of any change of the alliance's policy towards Moscow. Van den Brande also said there was no prospect of Russia being thrown out of the Council of Europe.

According to Zbigniew Brzezinski "the overt and increasingly arbitrary political manipulation of Russia's political process culminated in the elections to Duma in late 2007 that were not much more than a state controlled public plebiscite. The ultimate irony is that, at the time, Putin could in all probability prevailed even in a truly contested electoral process".
