= Podari Zhizn =

Russian non-governmental charitable organization

- Formation: November 26, 2006; 19 years ago
- Type: Non-profit organization
- Headquarters: Moscow
- Region served: Russia; sister charities in the UK (Gift of Life) and in the USA (Podari.Life)
- Services: treatment, support and rehabilitation of children with oncological and other life-threatening conditions
- Founders: Dina Korzun; Chulpan Khamatova
- Director: Ekaterina Shergova
- Website: podari-zhizn.ru www.giftoflife.eu www.podari.life

Podari Zhizn (Russian: Подари жизнь) is a nationwide Russian non-governmental charitable organisation, founded in 2006 by the actresses Dina Korzun and Chulpan Khamatova. It has sister charities in the United Kingdom, operating under the name Gift of Life, and in the United States, known as Podari.Life.

The principal aim of the foundation is the treatment, support and rehabilitation of children and young adults suffering from oncological, haematological and other life-threatening conditions in Russia and the CIS.

== History ==
The Russian branch of the organisation was founded on 26 November 2006 by the acclaimed Russian actresses Chulpan Khamatova and Dina Korzun. The concept was proposed by Galina Chalikova, who subsequently became the organisation's first director, together with the oncohaematologists Galina Novichkova, Alexei Maschan and Mikhail Maschanov. Prior to this, similarly named benefit concerts had been organised by a group of activists, most notably Yuri Shevchuk.

Since then, regular events have been organised in Moscow featuring many prominent Russian cultural figures, among them Andrey Makarevich, Chaif, Oleg Basilashvili, Alisa Freindlich, Diana Arbenina, Marina Neyolova, Liya Akhedzhakova, Leonid Yarmolnik, Sergei Garmash, Artur Smolyaninov, Viktoriya Tolstoganova, Emmanuil Vitorgan, Konstantin Khabensky, Vyacheslav Butusov, Ilya Lagutenko, Mumiy Troll, Neschastny Sluchai and others.

The foundation established connections with a number of leading medical institutions, among them the Dmitry Rogachev National Research Center of Pediatric Haematology, Oncology and Immunology, the Russian Children's Clinical Hospital, the Russian Research Center of Radiology, the Moscow Regional Oncology Center, the N. N. Burdenko Institute of Neurosurgery, the Morozov Children's Municipal Clinical Hospital, the S. P. Botkin Municipal Clinical Hospital, and oncology centres in various Russian regions.

In 2011, the Federal Centre for Paediatric Onco-Haematology was established, for which Podari Zhizn provided state-of-the-art equipment. The centre treats more than one thousand patients annually.

Each June, Podari Zhizn organises The World Children's Winners Games, an event designed to assist children who have overcome cancer in returning to a normal life and in rehabilitating after their prolonged struggle with the disease.

=== Gift of Life ===
A UK-based sister charity of Podari Zhizn, Gift of Life, was established on 2 March 2011 in London. The Foundation shares the mission of Podari Zhizn and relies on its expert team of doctors when considering any applications for support. Gift of Life works together with Podari Zhizn and Podari.Life to maximize support and care for children and young adults with cancer in Russian clinics, who might otherwise have no hope for successful treatment.

The Patrons of Gift of Life include Ralph Fiennes, Katie Melua, Nika Belotserkovskaya, Princess Katya Galitzine, Pavel Morozov and Ray Powles.

Gift of Life raises funds to pay for costly medications which are essential to treat certain types of cancer but are not yet available in Russia. It also facilitates searches for and activation of suitable bone marrow transplants in international donor registers if a donor cannot be found among the patient's siblings or parents, or in the Russian register.

The charity also arranges visits of leading foreign specialists to the Dmitry Rogachev National Medical Research Centre of Paediatric Haematology, Oncology and Immunology in Moscow to perform surgical operations and pass the unique surgical methods on to the Russian doctors. In addition to these visits Gift of Life provided education programmes for more than 50 doctors in Russia who will in turn save hundreds more lives.

Since 2011 Gift of Life gave hundreds of children from Russia and the CIS successful treatment and a chance to recover from cancer and other terminal illnesses.

Gift of Life gets a lot of support from the Russian-speaking community of the UK and European countries. The charity has organised numerous cultural charitable events in London, attracting a number of prominent philanthropists, entrepreneurs and renowned individuals from the worlds of art, culture, film, music and dance, e.g.Teodor Currentzis, Ralph Fiennes, Vanessa Redgrave, Katie Melua, Stephen Fry, Mark-Francis Vandelli, Vivien Duffield., Natalia Vodianova, Antoine Arnault, Leonard Blavatnik, Erik Bulatov, Uliana Lopatkina, Natalia Osipova, Sergei Polunin, the London Philharmonic Orchestra, Vladimir Jurowski, Vladimir Spivakov, Hibla Gerzmava, Gidon Kremer and many more.

The main fundraiser of the charity is the annual Russian Old New Year's Eve Gala which accounted for most of the foundation's income over the decade. Since its inception, Gift of Life with the help of its donors managed to support over 580 applications for life-saving medicine and non-medical treatment, spending over £7,000,000 on its programmes, which meant over 480 children and young adults, as well as their families received the Gift of Life's support. Gift of Life also provided education programmes for more than 50 doctors who will in turn save hundreds more lives. The most recent data on Gift of Life income and spending can be searched at the Charity Commission website.

=== Podari.Life ===
On 1 June 2015, Podari.Life Inc. was founded in the United States by a group of enthusiasts who had previously volunteered with Podari Zhizn. Its mission is to advance public education about childhood cancer and to raise awareness among medical professionals in Russia.

== Mission and goals ==
The foundation engages in multiple activities in the field of oncology in Russia. Its stated goals are:

- to raise money for the treatment and rehabilitation of children with cancer and serious blood diseases
- to help the oncology and hematology hospitals that treat children and young adults
- to raise the public awareness of problems faced by seriously ill children
- to promote the voluntary unpaid blood donor movement
- to provide social and psychological aid to the ill children
- to develop the work of volunteer groups at medical centers dealing with pediatric onco-hematology.

It also successfully lobbies for legislative changes and tax incentives that will promote access to anticancer drugs and improve conditions of oncological patients.

== Achievements ==
Since its creation, the Russian branch of the foundation has helped over 40 000 children and young adults. It is Russia's leading childhood cancer organization and one of the most recognizable independent charity foundations in Russia.

In 2012, the founders received a special prize For Humanism by the Russian Academy of Cinema Arts and Science.

== See also ==
- The World Children's Winners Games
- Media related to Gift of Life at Wikimedia Commons
