= Civilian Power =

Civilian Power Гражданская сила
- Leader: Kirill Bykanin (last)
- Founders: Alexander Ryavkin; Mikhail Barshchevsky
- Founded: 20 September 2002 (1st); 25 February 2012 (2nd)
- Dissolved: 15 November 2008 (1st); 15 January 2025 (2nd)
- Merged into: Right Cause (2008–2012)
- Headquarters: 32th building, Studenyy Passage, Moscow, Russia
- Ideology: Liberalism; Green liberalism
- Political position: Centre to centre-right
- Colours: Green; Yellow

Website
- gr-sila.ru

The Civilian Power or Citizens' Force (Russian: Гражданская сила, romanized: Grazhdanskaya sila, abbr. GS) was a green liberal political party in the Russian Federation. The organization was called the Network Party for Support of the Small and Middle Business in 2002, then renamed Free Russia in 2004, and in February 2007 changed to Civilian Power.

Members of the political council include:

- Mikhail Barshchevsky
- Valdis Pelsh
- Tatyana Ustinova
- Maxim Kononenko
- Eduard Uspensky

== The Party's names ==
- Russian Network Party for Support of the Small and Medium Business (RSP, 2002–2004)
- Free Russia Party (PSR, 2004—2007)
- Civilian Power (GS, 2007—2008)
- All-Russian Public Organization "Civilian Forces" (OOO GS, 2008—2012)
- Civilian Power (GS, 2012—2025)

== History ==
Logo of the Free Russia Party (2004-2007)

The "Free Russia" party was created in 2004, based on small and medium-sized Russian businesses. On October 8, 2006, the party overtook the 7% barrier on the legislative elections in Novgorod District. In November 2006, the 6th party conference was held. On February 27, 2007, Mikhail Barshchevsky, the chairman and plenipotentiary of the High Council of the Russian government, held a press conference. This was in aid of the party principles of Civilian Power. In the middle of April 2007, an organizational conference was held.

The chairman of the High Council is plenipotentiary of the Government of Russia in Constitutional, Supreme and Highest Arbitral Courts Mikhail Barshchevsky (a member since December 2006). The chairman of the Federal Political Council − The founder of the party, businessman Alexander Ryavkin from 2014 - 2015 year was the vice governor of Oryol Oblast.

The party won 1.05% of votes in the 2007 elections, not breaking the 7% barrier, and thus no seats in duma.

Civilian Power supported Dmitry Medvedev as their candidate in the presidential election in 2008.

It merged with Union of Right Forces and the Democratic Party of Russia to form the Right Cause on 16 November 2008.

Civilian Power was again registered as a political party on 7 June 2012.

The party advocates the legalization of prostitution in Russia.

In the elections of 2014, the party won one seat in the regional parliament of Nenets Autonomous Okrug.

At the end of November 2024, the Ministry of Justice of Russia appealed to the Supreme Court, demanding the liquidation of the Civilian Power political party. The Ministry of Justice argued that the party had not nominated candidates for federal elections for a long time and had hardly participated in local elections. On 15 January 2025, the Supreme Court upheld the appeal, dissolving the party.

== Electoral results ==
In 2017, the Party announced that the only candidate whom the party will support is current president Vladimir Putin. for the 2018 Russian presidential election.

=== Presidential elections ===
Election	Candidate	First round		Second round		Result
Election	Candidate	Votes	%	Votes	%	Result
2008	Endorsed Dmitry Medvedev	52,530,712	70.28%	—N/a		Elected ✓
2012	Party was part of Right Cause and did not participate in the elections					
2018	Endorsed Vladimir Putin	56,430,712	76.69%	—N/a		Elected ✓

=== Legislative elections ===
Election	Party leader	Performance					Rank	Government
Election	Party leader	Votes	%	± pp	Seats	+/–	Rank	Government
2007	Mikhail Barshchevsky	733,604	1.05%	New	0 / 450	New	7th	Extra-parliamentary
2011	Valeriy Ivanovsky	Party was part of Right Cause and did not participate in the elections						
2016	Kirill Bykanin	73,971	0.14%	▲0.14	0 / 450	0	▲14th	Extra-parliamentary
