= Mikhail Barshchevsky =

Russian lawyer

- Михаил Барщевский
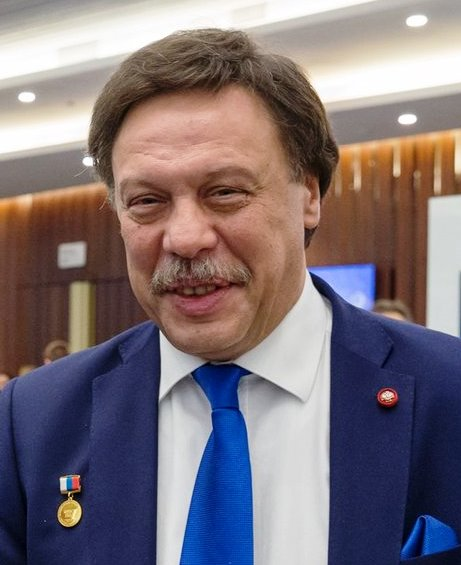
- Barshchevsky in 2019

Plenipotentiary representative of the Government of Russia to the Constitutional Court and the Supreme Court of Russia
- In office 6 August 2014 – 26 December 2025
- Succeeded by: Pavel Stepanov (acting)

Plenipotentiary representative of the Government of Russia to the Constitutional Court, the Supreme Court and the High Court of Arbitration of Russia
- In office 26 July 2001 – 6 August 2014

Plenipotentiary representative of the Government of Russia to the Constitutional Court of Russia
- In office 12 March 2001 – 26 July 2001
- Preceded by: Stanislav Yudushkin

Personal details
- Born: Mikhail Yuryevich Barshchevsky; 27 December 1955 (age 70) Moscow, Soviet Union
- Party: Communist Party of the Soviet Union (1983–1991); Civilian Power (2006–2008); Civic Platform (2012–2015)
- Spouse: Olga Barkalova
- Children: 3
- Education: Moscow State Law University (LL.D.)
- Awards: Order "For Merit to the Fatherland", 4th class Order of Honour; Honoured Lawyer of Russia

Mikhail Yuryevich Barshchevsky (Russian: Михаил Юрьевич Барщевский; born 27 December 1955) is a Russian jurist and former advocate and politician who served as the plenipotentiary representative of the Russian government to the highest courts of Russia from 2001 to 2025. (Note: This position is equivalent to that of the solicitor general in English-speaking nations) He has the federal state civilian service rank of 1st class Active State Councillor of the Russian Federation.

He was the chairman of the High Council for the Civilian Power party in 2007–2008.

== Biography ==
Mikhail Barshchevsky was born in Moscow, Soviet Union to a lawyer and an actress. In 1969, he joined the Komsomol. He was a member of the Communist Party of the Soviet Union from 1983 to 1991.

From 1973 to 1979, he worked as a legal consultant at the Moscow Margarine Plant. In 1978, he graduated from the All-Union Correspondence Law Institute (now Kutafin University). In 1980, he became an advocate at the Moscow City Bar, and in 1982 defended his Candidate of Sciences (Ph.D. equal) thesis at the Institute of State and Law of the Academy of Sciences of the Soviet Union. He underwent internships at Western law firms Milbank, Tweed, Hadley & McCloy (the United States) and Bureau Ricchi (France). In 1990, he founded and headed Russia's first private law firm, "Moscow Lawyers", which was transformed in 1993 into the advocate's bureau "Barshchevsky & Partners". In 1997, he obtained a Doctor of Sciences degree. He served as Anatoly Chubais's lawyer in the "Writers' Case" in 1997. He was a member of the coordinating council of the Moscow branch of the All Russia electoral bloc in 1999. He supported the federal authorities' actions in the Second Chechen War.

In 2000, he was awarded the academic title of Professor at the Moscow State Law Academy, in the Department of Advocacy and Notarial Practice.

In 2001, he voluntarily renounced his status as an advocate in connection with his transition to state service. On 12 March 2001, he was appointed plenipotentiary representative of the Russian government to the Constitutional Court. Four months later, on July 26, he became plenipotentiary representative of the Russian government to the Constitutional Court, the Supreme Court, and the High Court of Arbitration. (Note: The High Court of Arbitration was disestablished on August 6, 2014.)

In 2004, Barshchevsky co-hosted the court show Court Hour on REN TV alongside Pavel Astakhov.

From December 2006, he was a member of the Civilian Power party. In September 2007, at its 8th Congress, he was elected Chairman of the party's High Council and remained in this position until October 2008, when he announced his departure from politics and ceded his post to Boris Titov.

Until May 2012, he hosted the program Dura Lex on the Echo of Moscow radio station.

In October 2012, at the congress of the Civic Platform political party, he was elected to its Federal Civic Committee. He left the party in March 2015.

On 20 May 2018, he suffered a heart attack.

By Russian governmental executive order, he was relieved of his duties as plenipotentiary representative to the Constitutional Court and the Supreme Court on December 26, 2025, due to reaching the maximum age limit for holding a state civil service position.

== Awards ==
- Order "For Merit to the Fatherland", 4th class (2015)
- Order of Honour (2010)
- Honoured Lawyer of Russia (2007)
