= Neschastny Sluchai =

Russian rock band

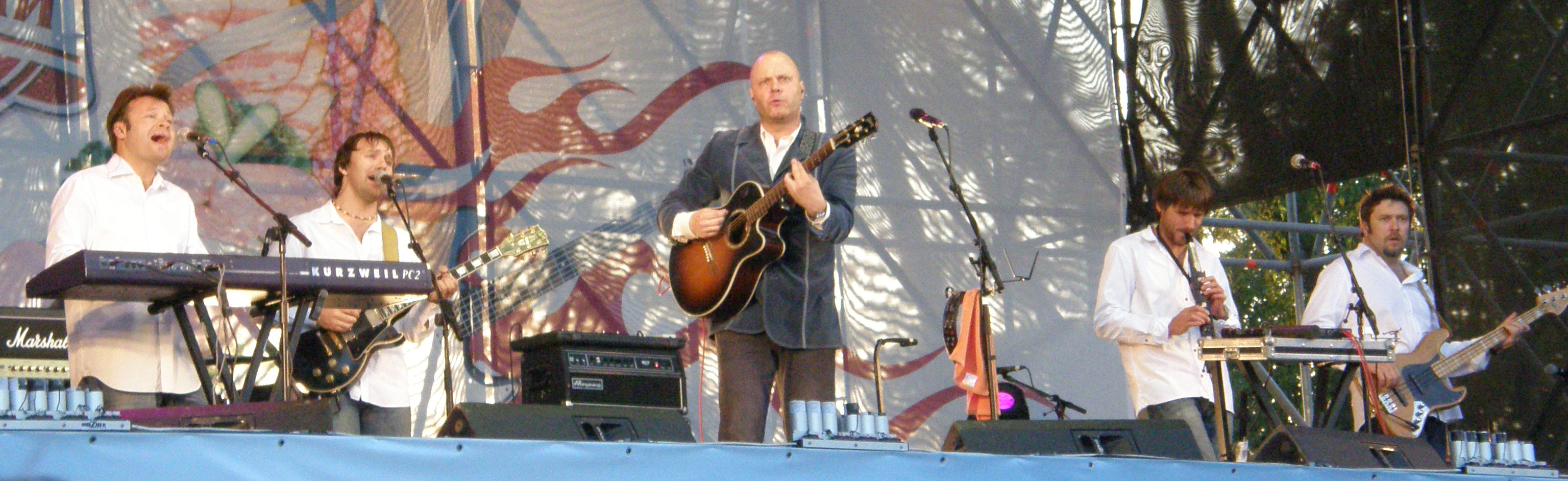
- Neschastny Sluchai in 2010

Background information
- Origin: Moscow, USSR
- Genres: Comedy rock; jazz fusion; art rock; pop rock; avant-pop; contemporary pop; bard rock; parody; indie pop
- Years active: 1983—present
- Members: Alexey Kortnev; Pavel Mordyukov; Sergey Chekryzhov; Dmitry Chuvelyov; Pavel Timofeev; Roman Mamaev
- Past members: Valdis Pelšs; Andrey Guvakov; Vadim Sorokin; Dmitry Morozov; Pavel Gonin; Pavel Cheremisin; Sergey Denisov
- Website: ns.ru

Neschastny Sluchai (Russian: Несчастный случай, literally "Unfortunate Event") is a Russian rock band that was formed by Valdis Pelsh and Alexey Kortnev in 1983, while both men were students at Moscow State University.

Despite being popular in Russia, the band is virtually unknown outside. The band leader, Alexei Kortnev, has repeatedly cited as major influences such bands as Queen, King Crimson, and Genesis. The band's lyrics are at the same time grotesque and sentimental while their music features complicated structures and melodic turns rooted in the prog rock of the '70s. The band's lyrics are usually short stories of ordinary people's life, written with good-natured irony.

== Members ==
- Alexey Kortnev (vocals, guitar, songwriting)
- Sergey Chekryzhov (keyboards, vocals)
- Dmitry Chuvelyov (bass, guitar, vocals)
- Pavel Timofeev (drums, percussion)

=== Past Members ===
- Pavel Mordyukov (saxophone, vocals)
- Roman Mamaev (bass)
- Pavel Cheremisin (drums, percussion)
- Valdis Pelsh (vocals, percussion)
- Andrey Guvakov (bass)
- Pavel Gonin (percussion, vocals)
- Dmitry Morozov (drums)
- Vadim Sorokin (drums)
- Sergey Denisov (saxophone)

== Discography ==
- 1994 — Trody pludov (Троды плудов)
- 1995 — Mein Lieber Tanz
- 1996 — Mezhsezon'e (Межсезонье)
- 1997 — Jeto ljubov' (Это любовь)
- 2000 — Chernosliv i kuraga (Чернослив и курага)
- 2003 — Poslednie den'ki v raju (Последние деньки в раю)
- 2006 — Prostye chisla (Простые числа)
- 2010 — Tonnel' v konce sveta (Тоннель в конце света)
- 2013 — Gonjajas' za bizonom (Гоняясь за бизоном)
- 2014 — Kranty (Кранты)
