= Valdis Pelšs =

Soviet-Russian TV presenter, director, producer and musician (born 1967)

Valdis Pelšs (lv) Valdis Pelsh (ru)
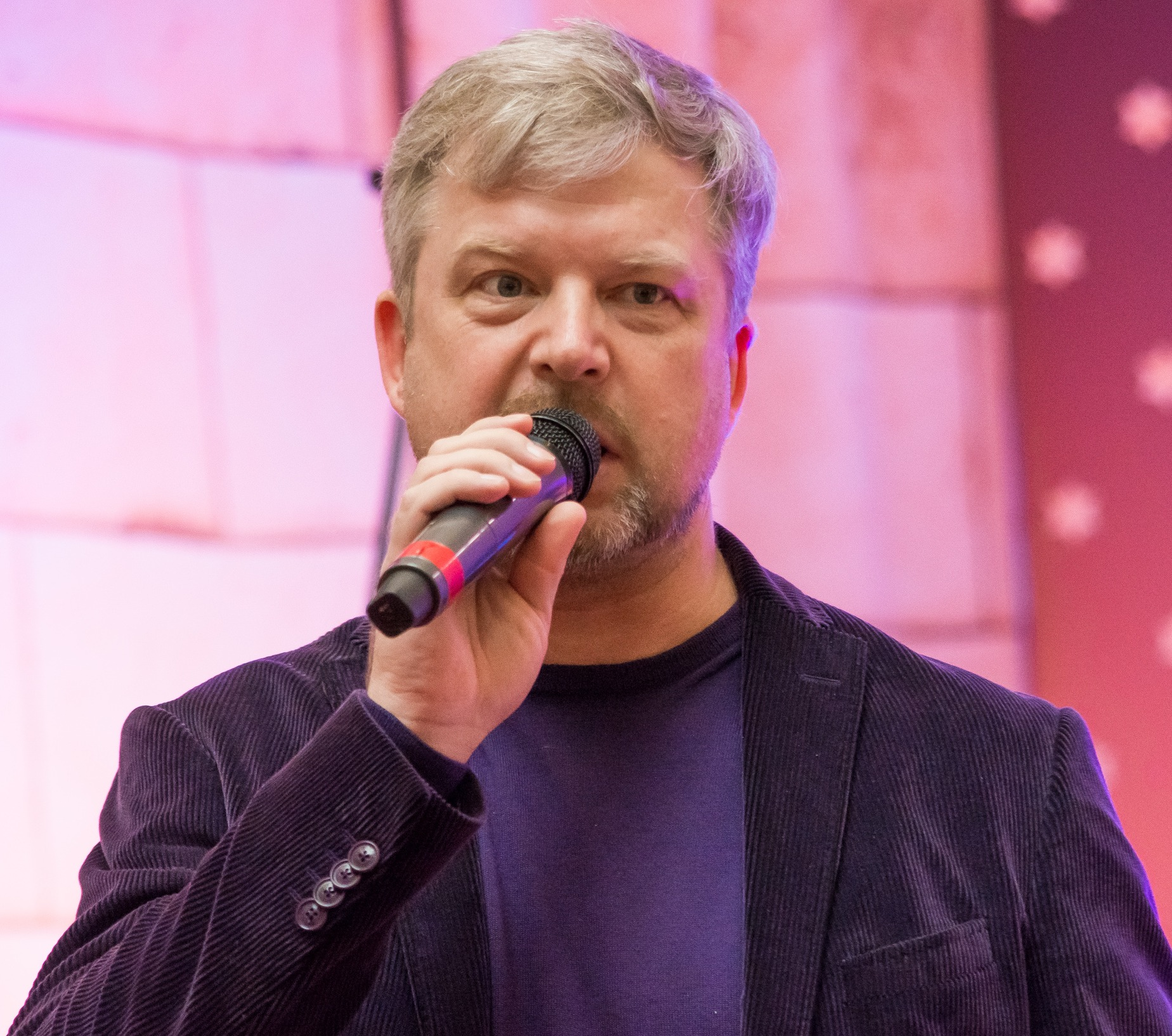
- Pelšs at Central Children's Store on Lubyanka in 2016
- Born: Valdis Pelšs; 5 June 1967 (age 59); Riga, Latvian SSR, Soviet Union
- Education: Moscow State University
- Occupations: television director, presenter
- Years active: 1983–present
- Television: Name That Tune
- Awards: TEFI 1997 ("game show presenter"); Zolotoi Grammofon 1996, 1997 (in Neschastny Sluchai band)
- Website: valdis-pelsh.com

Valdis Eyzhenovich (Yevgenyevich) Pelsh (Note: Russian: Валдис Эйженович (Евгеньевич) Пельш, Latvian: Valdis Pelšs) (Russian; Валдис Евгеньевич Пельш; born 5 June 1967) is a Soviet and Russian television presenter, television director, television producer and musician, winner of two TEFI awards (in 1997 and 2005). Valdis Pelšs currently works as a screen actor and manages child programs subdivision on Channel One. He hosted several popular game shows, such as Ugadai Melodiu, Russian Roulette and Rozygrysh. Pelšs is a former vocalist and percussion instrument player for Neschastny Sluchai, a band founded by him and Alexei Kortnev in 1983.

== Career ==
Valdis Pelšs graduated from the Lomonosov Moscow State University (MSU), Faculty of Philosophy. He first appeared on television as a contestant on the KVN show as part of the MSU team with his friend Alexei Kortnev (1987). Together they also participated in Oba-na. A few years earlier, in 1983, they had formed an alternative rock band called Neschastny Sluchai (the band's name meaning "unfortunate event" in Russian), which Pelšs would leave in 1997.

In 1995 Vladislav Listyev invited him to work on the musical game show Ugadai Melodiu, a Russian version of Name That Tune aired on Channel One. The show quickly gained popularity: it achieved a viewer share of 96%, for which Valdis Pelšs was inducted in The Guinness Book of Records as the most popular Russian television personality. After the death of Sergei Suponev in 2001 Pelšs manages child programs subdivision on Channel One. For his work as a TV host he received TEFI awards in 1997 and 2005.

== Shows hosted ==
- Ugadai Melodiu
- Ugadai i kompania (Ugadaika)
- Russian Roulette
- Vlastelin Vkusa
- Eti Zabavnye Zhyvotnye
- Rozygrysh
- Odni doma
- The Field of Wonders (Pole Chudes) (Each the episode aired as a special series twice, on 27 December 2002 and 30 December 2002)

== Filmography ==
- 1998: Na boykom meste
- 2000: Brother 2 (as himself)
- 2005: The Turkish Gambit
- 2007: Zolushka.ru (as himself)
- 2007: Lubov morkov
- 2008: Snezhniy chelovek
- 2018: Arctic Brotherhood. Documentary about Soviet and British air forces cooperation (This is a documentary about Soviet and British air forces cooperation in Murmansk mid-air during September–November of 1941)
