= Administrative divisions of Novosibirsk Oblast =

Administrative districts of Russian federal subject

Novosibirsk Oblast Russia
- Administrative center: Novosibirsk

Administrative structure (as of 2013)
- Districts: 30
- Cities/towns: 14
- Urban-type settlements: 17
- Selsovets: 429

Municipal structure (as of 2002:)
- Rural settlements: 1,566 (inhabited); 43 (uninhabited)

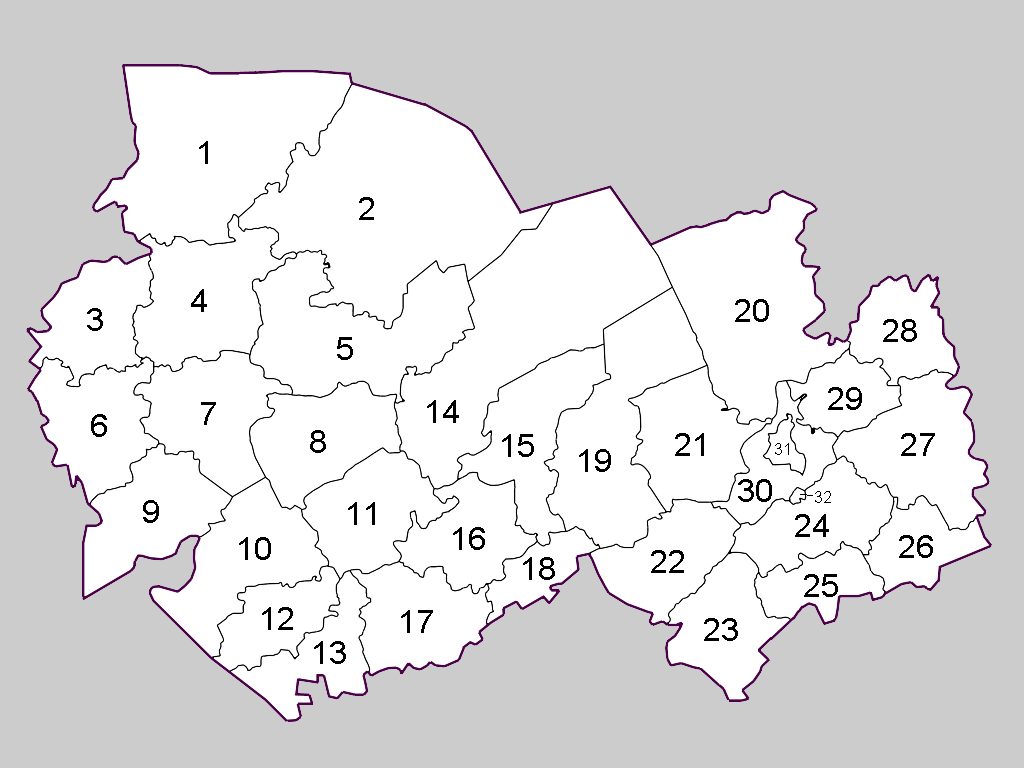
Numbered map

Republic of Kalmykia is a federal subject of Russia.

== Administrative and municipal divisions ==
Map

Division		Structure		OKATO	OKTMO	Urban-type settlement/ district-level town*	Rural (selsovet)
Division		Administrative	Municipal	OKATO	OKTMO	Urban-type settlement/ district-level town*	Rural (selsovet)
Novosibirsk (Новосибирск)		city	urban okrug	50 401	50 701		
↳	Dzerzhinsky (Дзержинский)	(under Novosibirsk)	—N/a	50 401	—N/a		
↳	Kalininsky (Калининский)	(under Novosibirsk)	—N/a	50 401	—N/a		
↳	Kirovsky (Кировский)	(under Novosibirsk)	—N/a	50 401	—N/a		
↳	Leninsky (Ленинский)	(under Novosibirsk)	—N/a	50 401	—N/a		
↳	Oktyabrsky (Октябрьский)	(under Novosibirsk)	—N/a	50 401	—N/a		
↳	Pervomaysky (Первомайский)	(under Novosibirsk)	—N/a	50 401	—N/a		
↳	Sovetsky (Советский)	(under Novosibirsk)	—N/a	50 401	—N/a		
↳	Tsentralny (Центральный)	(under Novosibirsk)	—N/a	50 401	—N/a		
↳	Zayeltsovsky (Заельцовский)	(under Novosibirsk)	—N/a	50 401	—N/a		
↳	Zheleznodorozhny (Железнодорожный)	(under Novosibirsk)	—N/a	50 401	—N/a		
Barabinsk (Барабинск)		city	(under Barabinsky)	50 405	50 604		
Berdsk (Бердск)		city	urban okrug	50 408	50 708		
Iskitim (Искитим)		city	urban okrug	50 412	50 712		
Kuybyshev (Куйбышев)		city	(under Kuybyshevsky)	50 415	50 630		
Ob (Обь)		city	urban okrug	50 417	50 717		
Tatarsk (Татарск)		city	(under Tatarsky)	50 418	50 650		
Bagansky (Баганский)		district		50 203	50 603		9
Barabinsky (Барабинский)		district		50 204	50 604		11
Bolotninsky (Болотнинский)		district		50 206	50 606	Bolotnoye (Болотное) town*	14
Vengerovsky (Венгеровский)		district		50 208	50 608		20
Dovolensky (Доволенский)		district		50 210	50 610		13
Zdvinsky (Здвинский)		district		50 213	50 613		14
Iskitimsky (Искитимский)		district		50 215	50 615	Linyovo (Линёво)	19
Karasuksky (Карасукский)		district		50 217	50 617	Karasuk (Карасук) town*	11
Kargatsky (Каргатский)		district		50 219	50 619	Kargat (Каргат) town*	10
Kolyvansky (Колыванский)		district		50 221	50 621	Kolyvan (Колывань)	11
Kochenyovsky (Коченёвский)		district		50 223	50 623	Chik (Чик); Kochenyovo (Коченёво)	14
Kochkovsky (Кочковский)		district		50 225	50 625		10
Krasnozyorsky (Краснозёрский)		district		50 227	50 627	Krasnozyorskoye (Краснозёрское)	18
Kuybyshevsky (Куйбышевский)		district		50 230	50 630		17
Kupinsky (Купинский)		district		50 232	50 632	Kupino (Купино) town*	15
Kyshtovsky (Кыштовский)		district		50 234	50 634		17
Maslyaninsky (Маслянинский)		district		50 236	50 636	Maslyanino (Маслянино)	11
Moshkovsky (Мошковский)		district		50 238	50 638	Moshkovo (Мошково); Stantsionno-Oyashinsky (Станционно-Ояшинский)	9
Novosibirsky (Новосибирский)		district		50 240	50 640	Koltsovo (Кольцово); Krasnoobsk (Краснообск)	17
Koltsovo (Кольцово)		(under Novosibirsky)	urban okrug	50 240	50 740		
Ordynsky (Ордынский)		district		50 242	50 642	Ordynskoye (Ордынское)	20
Severny (Северный)		district		50 244	50 644		12
Suzunsky (Сузунский)		district		50 248	50 648	Suzun (Сузун)	14
Tatarsky (Татарский)		district		50 250	50 650		21
Toguchinsky (Тогучинский)		district		50 252	50 652	Toguchin (Тогучин) town*; Gorny (Горный)	20
Ubinsky (Убинский)		district		50 254	50 654		16
Ust-Tarksky (Усть-Таркский)		district		50 255	50 655		13
Chanovsky (Чановский)		district		50 256	50 656	Chany (Чаны)	13
Cherepanovsky (Черепановский)		district		50 257	50 657	Cherepanovo (Черепаново) town*; Dorogino (Дорогино); Posevnaya (Посевная)	11
Chistoozyorny (Чистоозёрный)		district		50 258	50 658	Chistoozyornoye (Чистоозёрное)	16
Chulymsky (Чулымский)		district		50 259	50 659	Chulym (Чулым) town*	13
