= Cherepanovo =

Cherepanovo (Russian: Черепаново) is the name of several inhabited localities in Russia.

Urban localities

- Cherepanovo, Novosibirsk Oblast, a town in Cherepanovsky District, Novosibirsk Oblast

Rural localities

- Cherepanovo, Republic of Bashkortostan, a village in Maloyazovsky Selsoviet of Salavatsky District of the Republic of Bashkortostan
- Cherepanovo, Chuvash Republic, a village in Krasnochetayskoye Rural Settlement of Krasnochetaysky District of the Chuvash Republic
- Cherepanovo, Svetly, Kaliningrad Oblast, a settlement under the administrative jurisdiction of the town of oblast significance of Svetly, Kaliningrad Oblast
- Cherepanovo, Pravdinsky District, Kaliningrad Oblast, a settlement in Mozyrsky Rural Okrug of Pravdinsky District of Kaliningrad Oblast
- Cherepanovo, Kostroma Oblast, a village in Luptyugskoye Settlement of Oktyabrsky District of Kostroma Oblast
- Cherepanovo, Nizhny Novgorod Oblast, a village in Volzhsky Selsoviet of Sokolsky District of Nizhny Novgorod Oblast
- Cherepanovo, Orenburg Oblast, a selo in Novosergiyevsky Settlement Council of Novosergiyevsky District of Orenburg Oblast
- Cherepanovo, Cherdynsky District, Perm Krai, a village in Cherdynsky District, Perm Krai
- Cherepanovo, Karagaysky District, Perm Krai, a village in Karagaysky District, Perm Krai
- Cherepanovo, Sivinsky District, Perm Krai, a village in Sivinsky District, Perm Krai
- Cherepanovo, Vereshchaginsky District, Perm Krai, a village in Vereshchaginsky District, Perm Krai
- Cherepanovo, Sverdlovsk Oblast, a village in Artinsky District of Sverdlovsk Oblast
- Cherepanovo, Tyumen Oblast, a selo in Cherepanovsky Rural Okrug of Nizhnetavdinsky District of Tyumen Oblast
- Cherepanovo, Vologda Oblast, a village in Mazsky Selsoviet of Kaduysky District of Vologda Oblast
- Cherepanovo, Yaroslavl Oblast, a village in Kozsky Rural Okrug of Pervomaysky District of Yaroslavl Oblast
