= Moshkovo =

Moshkovo (Russian: Мошково) is the name of several inhabited localities (work settlements and villages) in Russia.

Urban localities

- Moshkovo, Novosibirsk Oblast, a work settlement in Moshkovsky District of Novosibirsk Oblast

Rural localities

- Moshkovo, Ivanovo Oblast, a village in Verkhnelandekhovsky District of Ivanovo Oblast
- Moshkovo, Leningrad Oblast, a village in Shugozerskoye Settlement Municipal Formation of Tikhvinsky District of Leningrad Oblast
- Moshkovo, Nizhny Novgorod Oblast, a village in Varezhsky Selsoviet of Pavlovsky District of Nizhny Novgorod Oblast
- Moshkovo, Perm Krai, a village in Sivinsky District of Perm Krai
- Moshkovo, Pskov Oblast, a village in Novosokolnichesky District of Pskov Oblast
- Moshkovo, Spirovsky District, Tver Oblast, a village in Spirovsky District, Tver Oblast
- Moshkovo, Vyshnevolotsky District, Tver Oblast, a village in Vyshnevolotsky District, Tver Oblast
- Moshkovo, Danilovsky District, Yaroslavl Oblast, a village in Slobodskoy Rural Okrug of Danilovsky District of Yaroslavl Oblast
- Moshkovo, Rybinsky District, Yaroslavl Oblast, a village in Shashkovsky Rural Okrug of Rybinsky District of Yaroslavl Oblast
