= Valeriy Andreev =

Russian fugitive serial killer and rapist

- Born: Valeriy Nikolayevich Andreev; 10 April 1957 (age 69); Shalkarsky, Orenburg Oblast, Russian SFSR, Soviet Union
- Other names: "The Orsk Maniac" "The Orsk Ripper" "The Orsk Chikatilo" "The Trucker Maniac"

Details
- Victims: 7 confirmed, 100+ suspected
- Span of crimes: 2006–2012
- Country: Russia
- States: Orenburg, possibly others
- Date apprehended: N/A

Valeriy Nikolayevich Andreev (Russian: Вале́рий Никола́евич Андре́ев; born 10 April 1957), known as the Orsk Maniac (Russian: Орский маньяк, romanized: Orskiy manyak), is a Russian serial killer and rapist responsible for the abductions, rapes and killings of various girls and women in Orenburg Oblast from 2006 to 2012. Investigators have conclusively tied him to at least 7 murders, after which he was put on a wanted list, but managed to escape. As of 2023, he remains one of the twelve most dangerous criminals wanted by the Ministry of Internal Affairs of Russia. In total, police suspect his involvement in the disappearances of more than 100 girls and women.

== Biography ==
Little is known about Andreev's upbringing. He was born on 10 April 1957 in the village of Shalkarsky, Orenburg Oblast. After leaving school, Andreev mastered the profession of a driver and worked as a trucker for many years. He led a law-abiding lifestyle, did not abuse alcohol or drugs, was married and had two sons. Despite the fact that most of his friends, relatives and acquaintances spoke very fondly of him, at the same time, a number of colleagues claimed that since the mid-2000s, Andreev began exhibiting social problems and was in a state of psychological discomfort. Because of this, he engaged minimally with his colleagues and preferred to work alone during long-haul jobs.

== Exposure ==
Valeriy Andreev came under suspicion of serial murder in late June 2012, after the disappearance of 18-year-old Olga Zhuravlyova. Witnesses said to police that, before her disappearance, Zhuravlyova was last seen entering a white SsangYong SUV. The movement of the car was recorded by surveillance cameras, after which it was located in the city of Orsk. During the investigation and verification procedures, it was found that only two such registered cars in the city—one of the owners being Valeriy Andreev. With the help of mobile operators, authorities learned that Andreev and Zhuravlyova were in the same place shortly before the girl's disappearance, in connection with which he was detained and interrogated in early July of that year. Due to the lack of grounds for arrest, Andreev was released. His car, garage, and company truck were all searched, during which biological traces and several blood stains were located. During a survey, a number of fellow truckers told law enforcement officials that for several years they had suspected Andreev of using the services of prostitutes, as contraceptives, jewellery, women's underwear, hairpins, and a number of other accessories for hair and clothes were found in his vehicle. Thanks to these testimonies, Andreev was soon again summoned for questioning but did not appear. On 6 July 2012, he last got in touch with his wife, after which he disappeared and was put on a wanted list.

== Subsequent events and current status ==
During the investigation, it turned out that the routes of Andreev's long-distance hauls ran along the Orenburg–Chelyabinsk and Samara–Orenburg highways. A lot of girls and women missing from the area (who were either residents of Orsk, or the villages of Novosergiyevka; Kamennozyornoe; Tasbulak and Mozharovka) disappeared in the forest belts of the highways. By the nature of his profession, Valeriy Andreev also repeatedly visited cities such as Samara, Chelyabinsk, Orenburg and Nizhny Novgorod. Shortly after his escape, search measures for his capture were launched in those cities, but to no avail. The remains of his last confirmed victim, Olga Zhuravlyova, were found on 10 September 2013 in the area surrounding the village of Dzhanatalap, in the forest belt near the Orsk–Chelyabinsk highway.

In subsequent years, the police received dozens of calls and messages about possible sightings in different parts of the country, and even in neighbouring Kazakhstan. As a result of this, search measures were launched in Russia's republics of Karelia, Mordovia, Udmurtia, in the Siberian Federal District and Kaliningrad Oblast, but, yet again, to no avail.

On 28 October 2019, he was positively identified in the vacation village of Torkovichi, Luzhsky District, Leningrad Oblast, by local resident Tatyana Ivanova.

Ivanova reported this to the law enforcement bodies in Leningrad Oblast, Saint Petersburg and Orenburg; however, no significant actions were taken by either the Ministry of Internal Affairs or the Investigative Committee. The fact that Andreev is hiding out in Leningrad Oblast or Saint Petersburg was also confirmed by numerous other residents, who also reported seeing him.

In late 2019, after 7 years of unsuccessful searches, the international organisation Interpol took up the search for Andreev. On the International Day for the Elimination of Violence against Women, Interpol prepared a list of eight international fugitives for alleged crimes against women, including murder: Valeriy Andreev topped that list of wanted criminals.

In March 2021, a witness claimed to have seen a man resembling Andreev in Odintsovo, near Moscow. No further reported sightings have yet been made.

== See also ==
- List of Russian serial killers
