= Yasnogorsky =

Yasnogorsky (masculine), Yasnogorskaya (feminine), or Yasnogorskoye (neuter) may refer to:

- Yasnogorsky District, a district of Tula Oblast, Russia
- Yasnogorsky (rural locality) (Yasnogorskaya, Yasnogorskoye), several rural localities in Russia
