= Novosergiyevsky =

Novosergiyevsky (masculine), Novosergiyevskaya (feminine), or Novosergiyevskoye (neuter) may refer to:

- Novosergiyevsky District, a district of Orenburg Oblast, Russia
- Novosergiyevsky (rural locality), a rural locality (a settlement) in Oryol Oblast, Russia
- Novosergiyevskaya, a rural locality (a stanitsa) in Krasnodar Krai, Russia
