= Heydekrug =

Heydekrug may refer to places in former East Prussia:

- Šilutė, now Lithuania, the site of Stalag Luft VI - a World War II German allied aircrew POW camp
- Landkreis Heydekrug: Former district of East Prussia until 1945
- Places now in Kaliningrad Oblast, Russia, the sites of the Battle of Königsberg at the Vistula Lagoon to the west of Königsberg:
  - Groß-Heydekrug (now Vzmorye)
  - Klein-Heydekrug (probably Cherepanovo)
