= Kuybyshevsky District, Novosibirsk Oblast =

Kuybyshevsky District Куйбышевский район (Russian)
- District
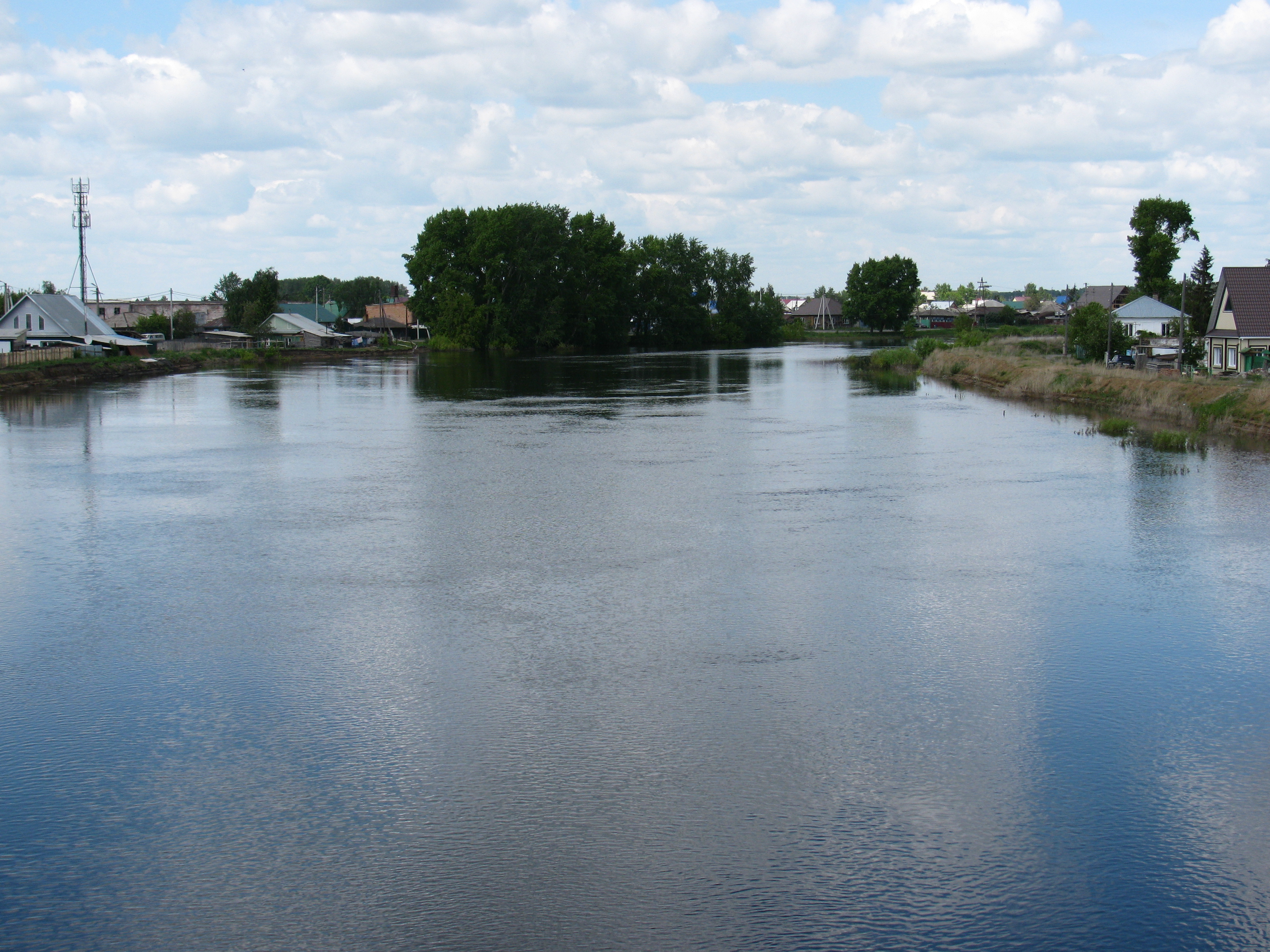
- Flood on Om River, 2015, village Moshnino, Kuybyshevsky District

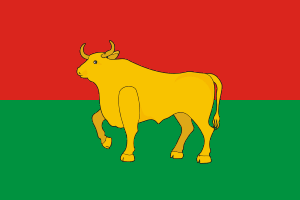
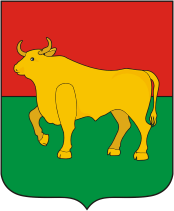
- Flag Coat of arms
- Location of Kuybyshevsky District in Novosibirsk Oblast
- Coordinates: 55°27′N 78°18′E
- Country: Russia
- Federal subject: Novosibirsk Oblast
- Established: 1936
- Administrative center: Kuybyshev

Area
  - Total: 8,823.3 km^{2} (3,406.7 sq mi)

Population (2010 Census)
  - Total: 15,466
  - Density: 1.7529/km^{2} (4.5399/sq mi)
  - Urban: 0%
  - Rural: 100%

Administrative structure
  - Inhabited localities: 77 rural localities

Municipal structure
  - Municipally incorporated as: Kuybyshevsky Municipal District
  - Municipal divisions: 1 urban settlements, 17 rural settlements
- Time zone: UTC+7 (MSK+4)
- OKTMO ID: 50630000
- Website: http://www.kuibyshev.nso.ru/

Kuybyshevsky District (Russian: Ку́йбышевский райо́н) is an administrative and municipal district (raion), one of the thirty in Novosibirsk Oblast, Russia. It is located in the center of the oblast. The area of the district is 8,823.3 square kilometers (3,406.7 sq mi). Its administrative center is the town of Kuybyshev (which is not administratively a part of the district). Population: 15,466 (2010 Census); 19,386 (2002 census); 21,758 (1989 Soviet census).

== Administrative and municipal status ==
Within the framework of administrative divisions, Kuybyshevsky District is one of the thirty in the oblast. The town of Kuybyshev serves as its administrative center, despite being incorporated separately as an administrative unit with the status equal to that of the districts.

As a municipal division, the district is incorporated as Kuybyshevsky Municipal District, with the Town of Kuybyshev being incorporated within it as Kuybyshev Urban Settlement.
