= Lake Karachi =

Lake in Novosibirsk Oblast, Russia

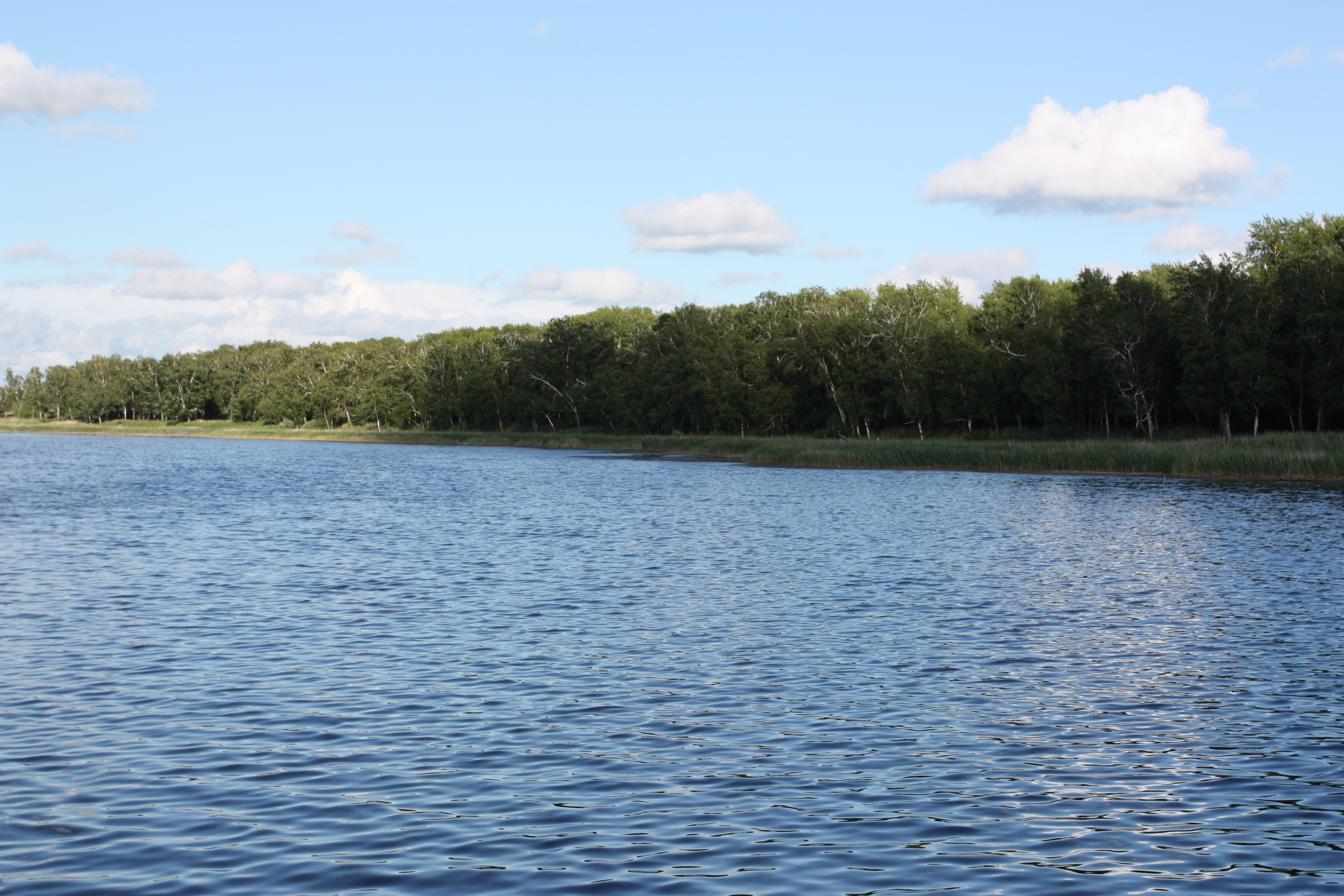

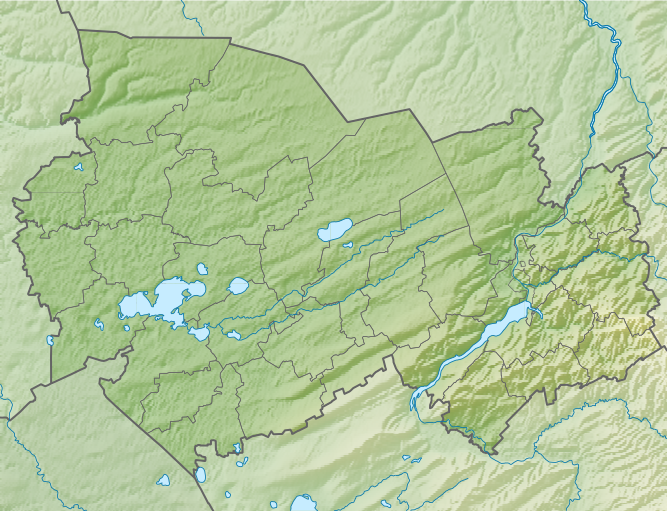
- Location in Novosibirsk Oblast, Russia
- Location: Novosibirsk Oblast, Russia
- Coordinates: 55°21′N 76°57′E
- Surface area: 2.9 km^{2} (1.1 sq mi)

Lake Karachi (Russian: Озеро Карачи) is an endorheic saltwater lake in Chanovsky District of Novosibirsk Oblast, Russia. Karachi has a surface area of 2,9 km^{2} (1.1 sq mi).

The lake and its surroundings are located in a protected area of the Baraba Steppe.

== Gallery ==
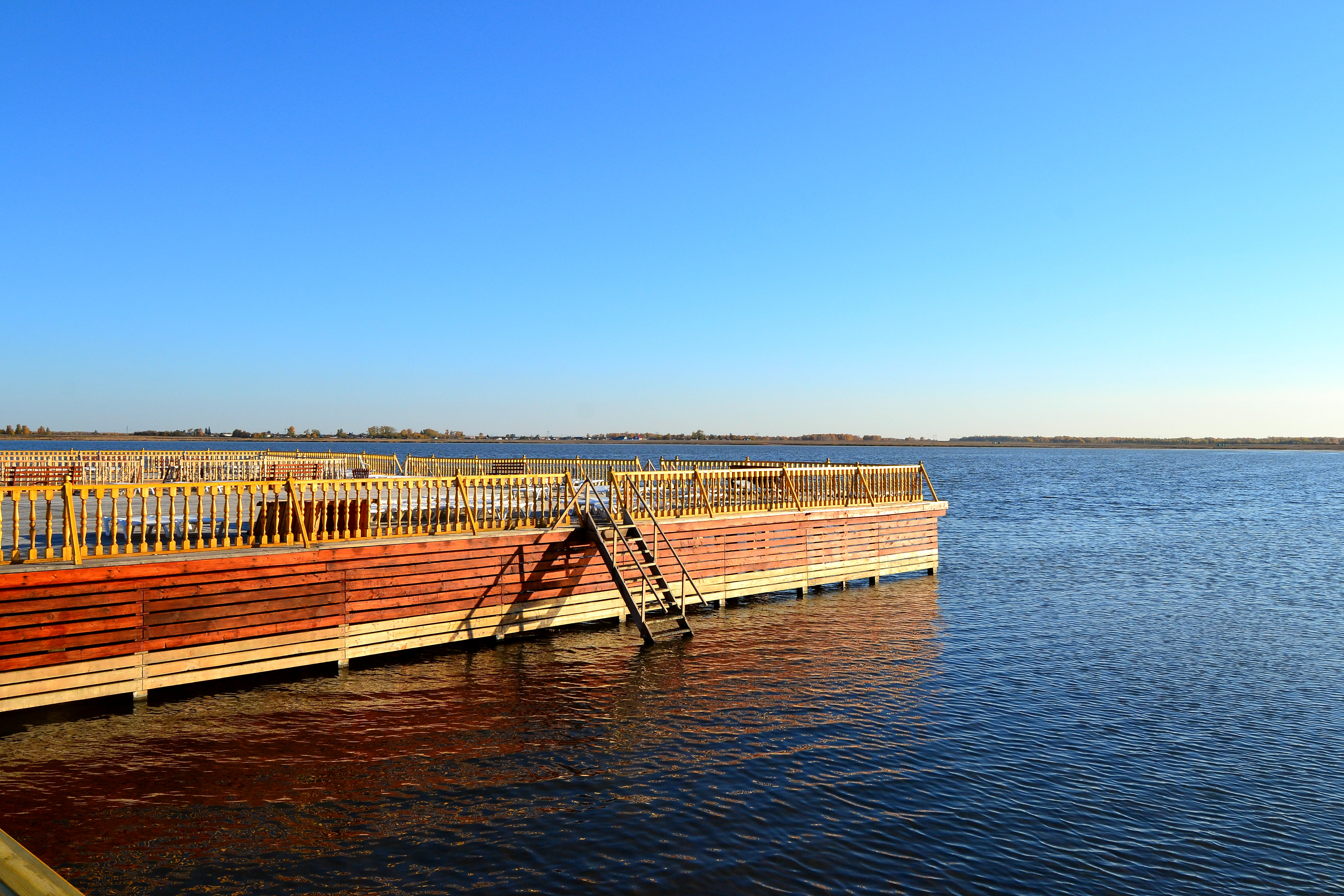

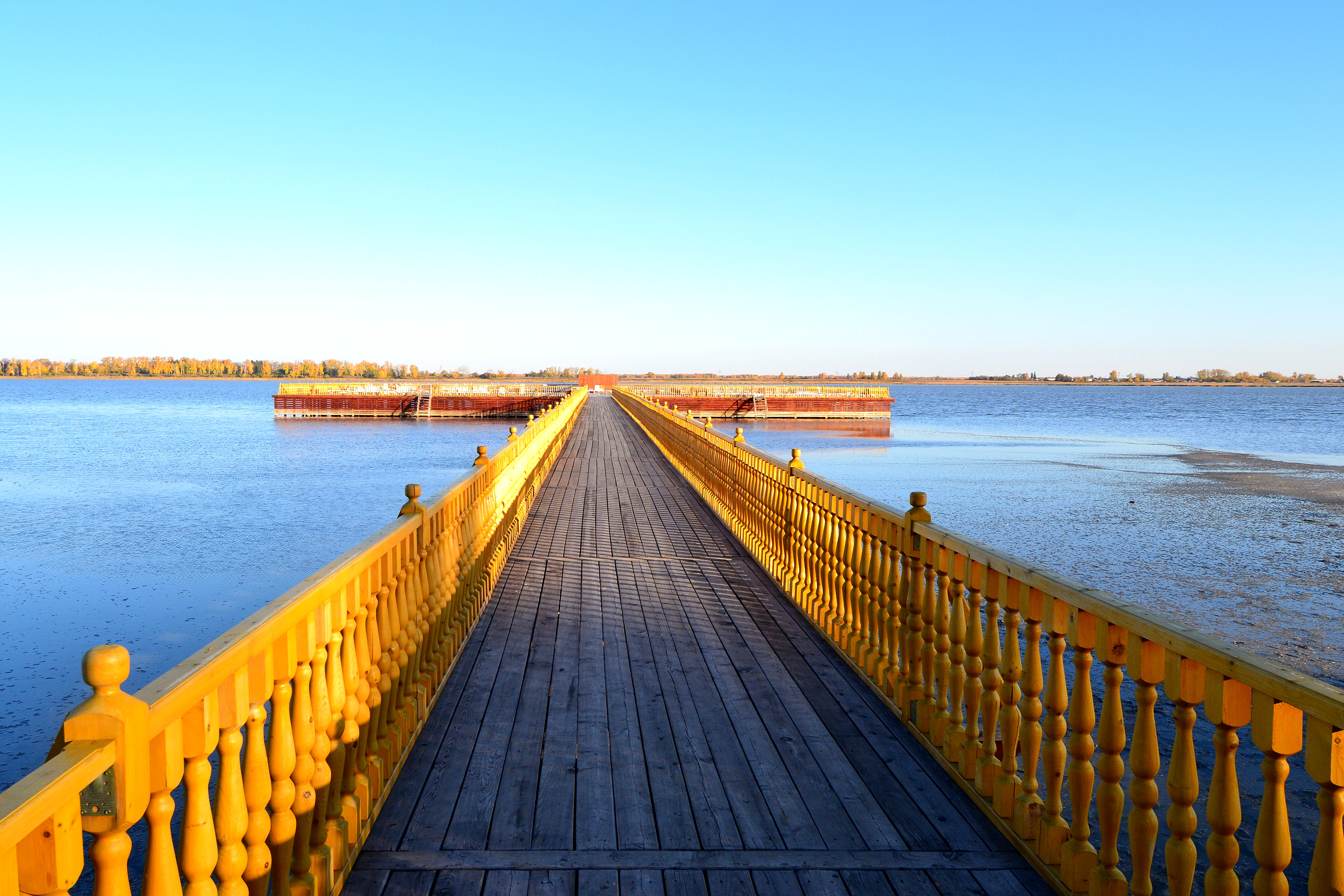

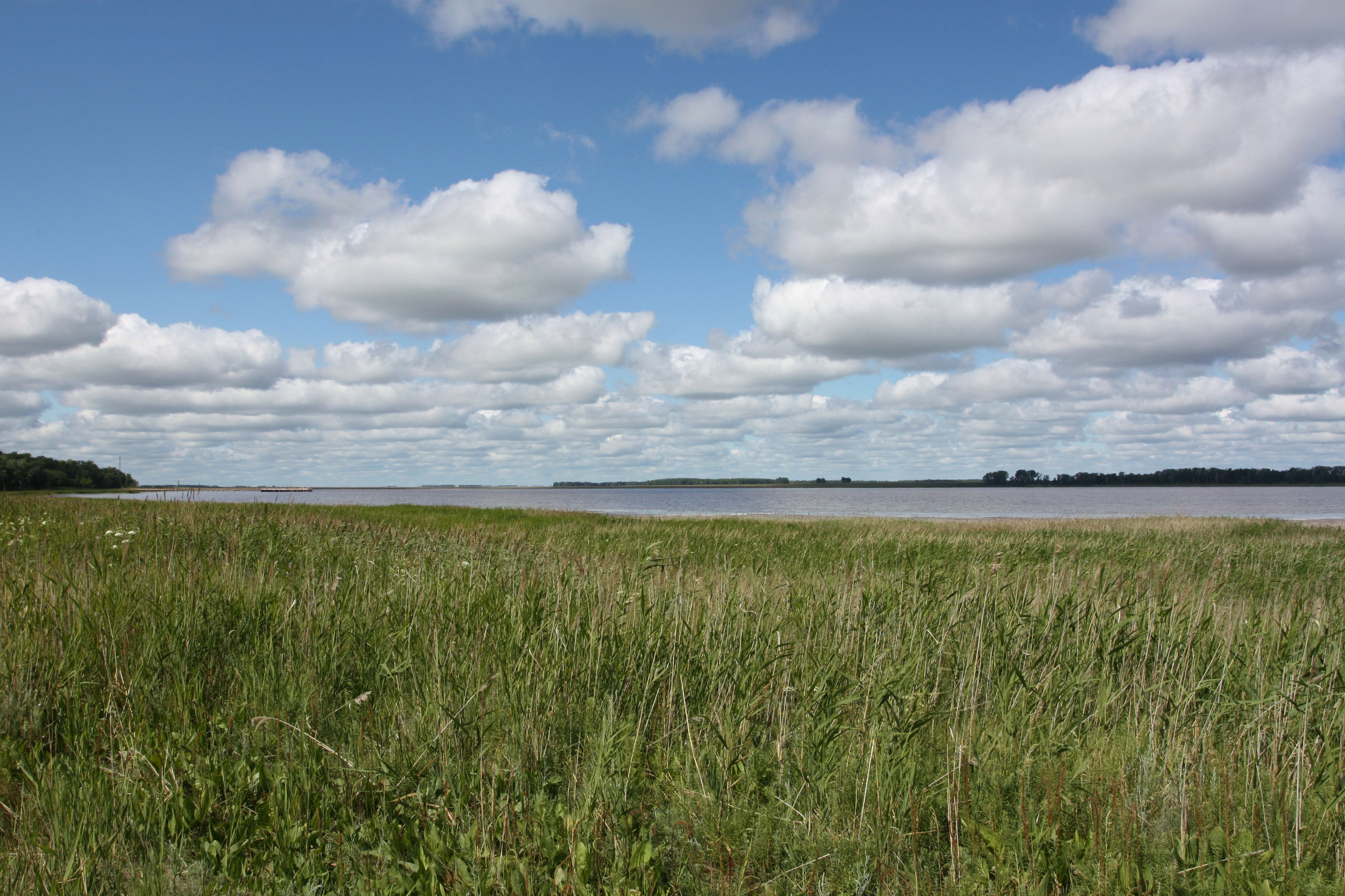

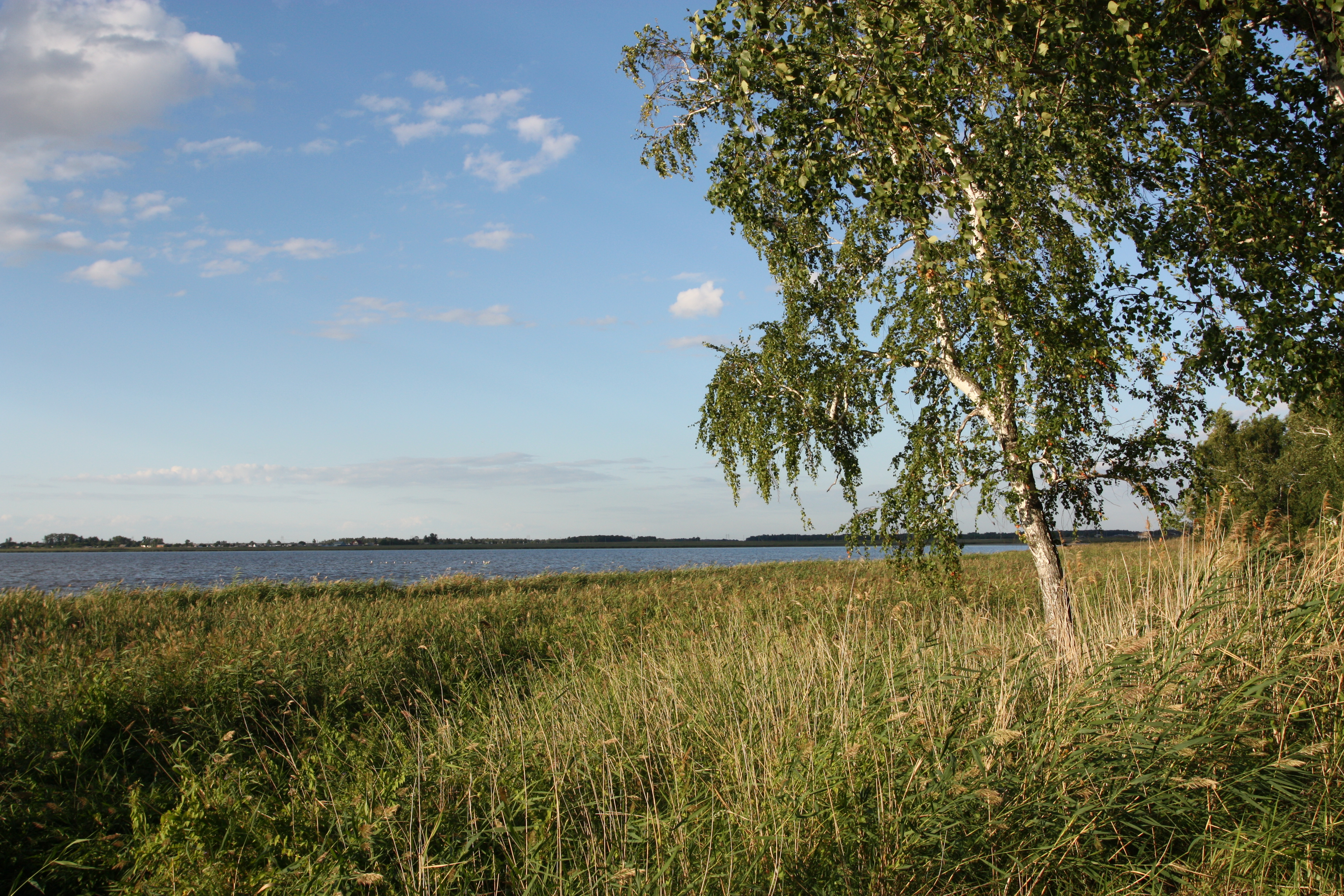
