= Kuybyshev, Novosibirsk Oblast =

Town in Novosibirsk Oblast, Russia

Kuybyshev Куйбышев
- Town
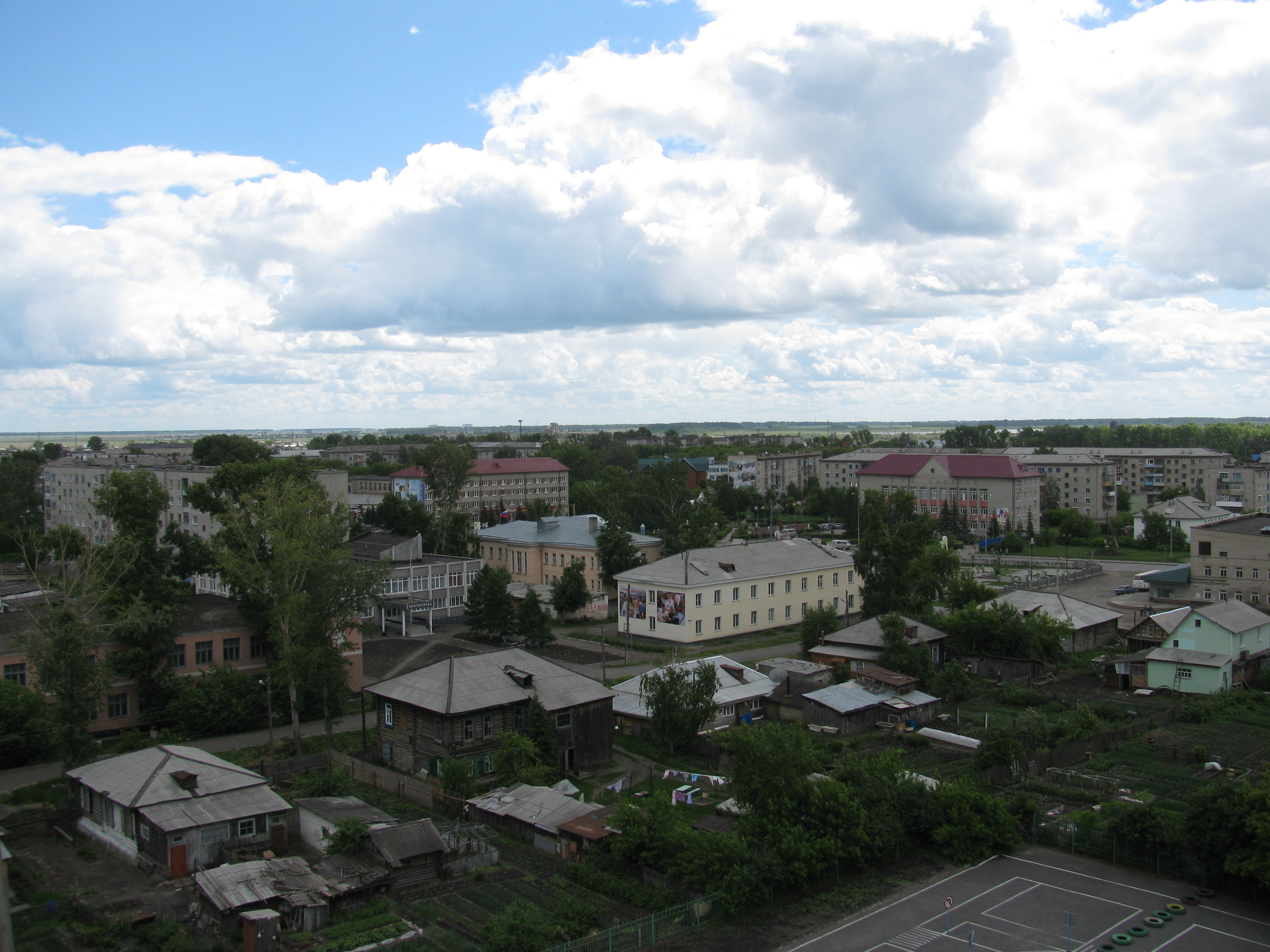
- View of Kuybyshev

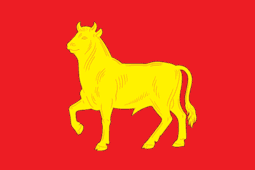
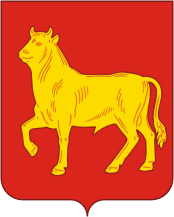
- Flag Coat of arms
- Interactive map of Kuybyshev
- Location of Kuybyshev Kuybyshev (Novosibirsk Oblast)
- Coordinates: 55°27′N 78°18′E
- Country: Russia
- Federal subject: Novosibirsk Oblast
- Founded: 1722
- Town status since: January 30, 1782
- Elevation: 110 m (360 ft)

Population (2010 Census)
  - Total: 45,299
  - Estimate (2025): 41,123 (−9.2%)

Administrative status
  - Subordinated to: Town of Kuybyshev
  - Capital of: Town of Kuybyshev, Kuybyshevsky District

Municipal status
  - Municipal district: Kuybyshevsky Municipal District
  - Urban settlement: Kuybyshev Urban Settlement
  - Capital of: Kuybyshevsky Municipal District, Kuybyshev Urban Settlement
- Time zone: UTC+7 (MSK+4)
- Postal code: 632380–632387
- OKTMO ID: 50630101001
- Website: kainsk-today.ru

Kuybyshev (Russian: Ку́йбышев) is a town in Novosibirsk Oblast, Russia, located on the Om River (Irtysh's tributary), 315 kilometers (196 mi) west of Novosibirsk, the administrative center of the oblast. Population: 45,299 (2010 census); 48,848 (2002 census); 51,171 (1989 Soviet census); 40,000 (1970).

== History ==
It was founded as a military fort named Kainsky Pas (Каинский Пас) in 1722. On January 30, 1782, it was granted town status and renamed Kainsk. In 1804, it became a part of Tomsk Governorate. In 1935, it was renamed Kuybyshev after Valerian Kuybyshev, who was exiled to Kainsk in 1907 and lived here for two years.

== Administrative and municipal status ==
Within the framework of administrative divisions, Kuybyshev serves as the administrative center of Kuybyshevsky District, even though it is not a part of it. As an administrative division, it is incorporated separately as the Town of Kuybyshev—an administrative unit with the status equal to that of the districts. As a municipal division, the Town of Kuybyshev is incorporated within Kuybyshevsky Municipal District as Kuybyshev Urban Settlement.
