= Grigori F. Krivosheev =

Soviet/Russian general and military historian (1929–2019)

Grigoriy Fedotovich Krivosheyev (Russian: Григорий Федотович Кривошеев, 15 September 1929 – 29 April 2019) was a Russian military historian and a Colonel General of the Russian military. He is mostly known in the West, via an alternative transliteration of his name, Krivosheev, as the editor of a book on Soviet military casualties in the 20th century, which was translated and published in English.

== Biography ==
Grigoriy Krivosheyev was born in the village of Kinterep, Legostayevsky (now Maslyaninsky District) of the Novosibirsk Oblast (province) in western Siberia.

He was a graduate of the Frunze Military Academy. A Ph.D. (Candidate of Sciences) in military science, from 1995 Krivosheyev is a professor in the Russian Academy of Military Sciences.

== Published works ==
General Krivosheyev became widely known after the 1993 publication of the book titled Гриф секретности снят: Потери Вооруженных Сил СССР в войнах, боевых действиях и военных конфликтах (Transliteration: Grif sekretnosti snyat: poteri vooruzhyonnyh sil SSSR v voynah, boevyh deystviyah i voennyh konfliktah), originally in Russian, and about Soviet military casualties in various conflicts of the twentieth century, particularly in World War II. With Krivosheyev being the general editor of the book, this analysis prepared by historians based on declassified Soviet archival data represents the first comprehensive attempt to scientifically address the losses of the armed forces of the former Soviet Union during World War II. Previously, the number of human casualties was mostly a matter of political speculations, and widely fluctuated with changes in political expediencies. In 1997 Krivosheyev's book was translated and published in English under the title of Soviet Casualties and Combat Losses in the Twentieth Century.

A follow-up book also under editorship of Krivosheyev addressed Russian and Soviet combat losses in the wars of the 20th century, titled Russia and the USSR in the Wars of the Twentieth Century: Losses of the Armed Forces. A Statistical Study, was published in Moscow in 2001.

== Commentary on Krivosheev ==
Krivosheev's analysis has generally been accepted by historians, however his study has been disputed by some independent researchers in Russia. His critics maintain that he underestimated the number of missing in action and POW deaths and deaths of service personnel in rear area hospitals. Makhmut Gareev former Deputy Chief of the General Staff of the Armed Forces of the USSR maintains that the published information on Soviet casualties is the work of the individual authors and not based on official data. According to Gareev the Russian government has not disclosed the actual losses in the war. In 2000 S. N. Mikhalev published a study of Soviet casualties. From 1989 to 1996 he was an associate of the Institute of Military History of the Ministry of Defence. Mikhalev disputed Krivosheev's figure of 8.7 million military war dead, he put the losses of the at more than 10.9 million persons based on his analysis of those conscripted. He maintained that the official figures cannot be reconciled to the total men drafted and that POW deaths were understated. Mikhalev put total irreplaceable losses at 13.7 million, he believed at the official figures understated POW and missing losses, the deaths of service personnel convicted of offenses were not included with overall losses and the number that died of wounds was understated. German historian Roman Töppel, in his 2017 book on the battle of Kursk (written after consulting all available armies and units archives), noted that Krivosheev's figures for the Battle of Kursk are underestimated, probably by 40%.

Krivosheev did maintain POW and MIA losses of the combat forces were actually 1.783 million, according to Krivosheev the higher figures of dead includes reservists not on active strength, civilians and military personnel who were captured in the war.

== Death ==
Krivosheev died on 29 April 2019 and was buried in the Federal Military Memorial Cemetery on 2 May 2019.
