= Gorny, Toguchinsky District, Novosibirsk Oblast =

Gorny Горный
- Urban-type settlement
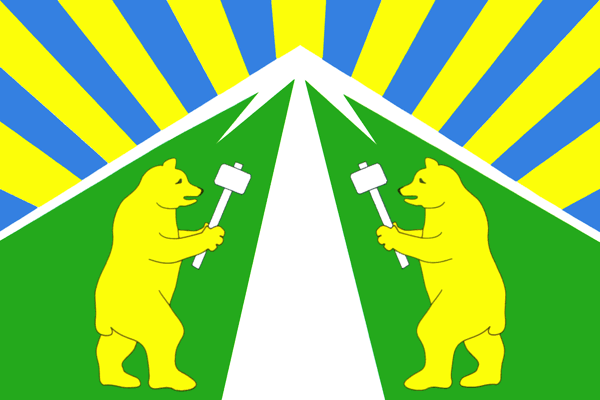
- Flag
- Interactive map of Gorny
- Location of Gorny Gorny (Novosibirsk Oblast)
- Coordinates: 55.1183°N 83.8796°E
- Country: Russia
- Federal subject: Novosibirsk Oblast
- Administrative district: Toguchinsky District
- Founded: 1953
- Elevation: 208 m (682 ft)

Population (2010 Census)
  - Total: 9,403
  - Estimate (2025): 8,633 (−8.2%)
- Time zone: UTC+7 (MSK+4)
- Postal code: 633411
- OKTMO ID: 50652153051

Gorny (Russian: Горный) is an urban locality (an urban-type settlement) in Toguchinsky District of Novosibirsk Oblast, Russia. Population: 9,403 (2010 census); 9,935 (2002 census); 7,624 (1989 Soviet census).
