= Chanovsky District =

Chanovsky District Чановский район (Russian)
- District
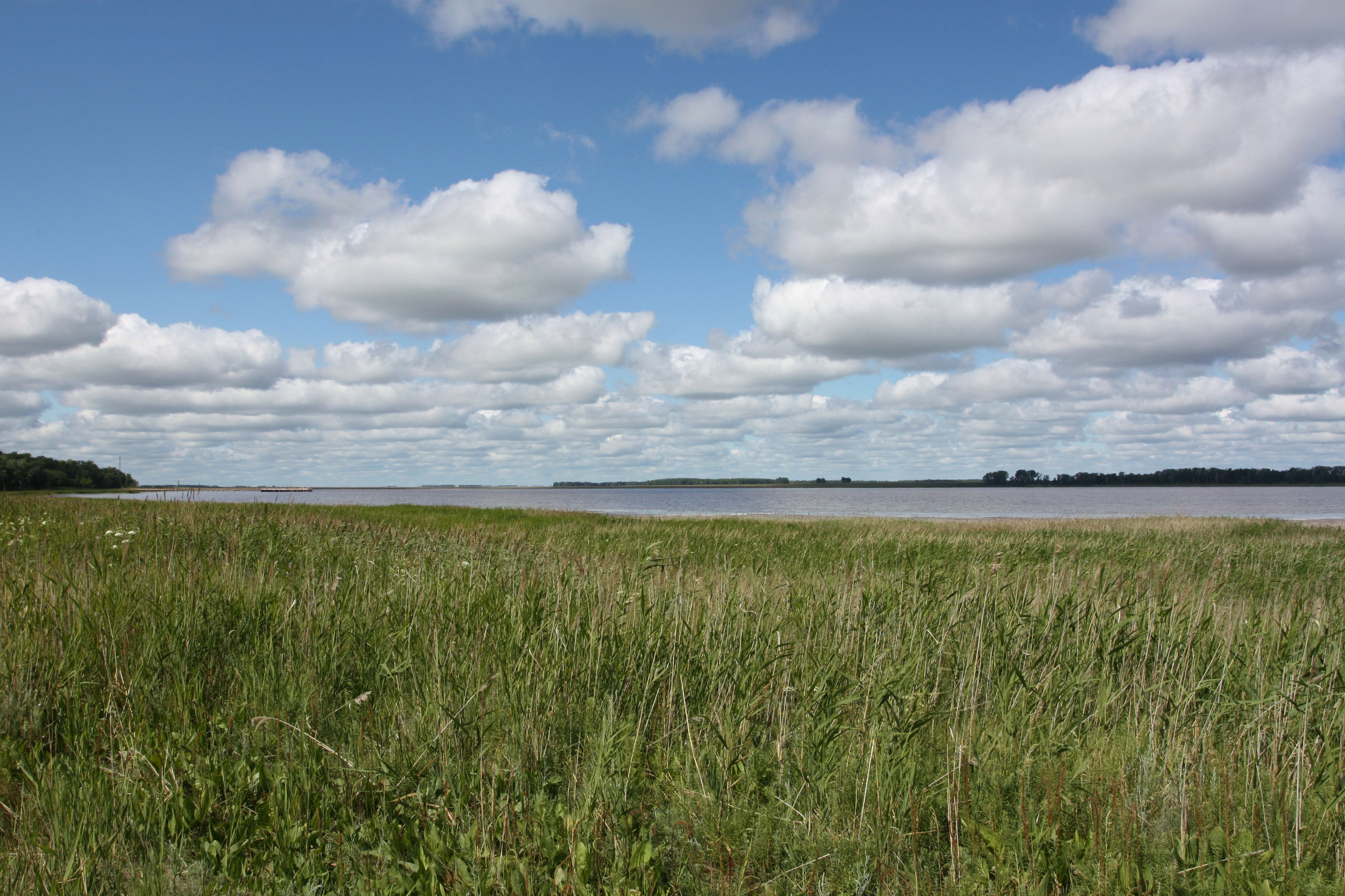
- Lake Karachi, Chanovsky District

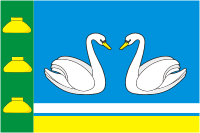
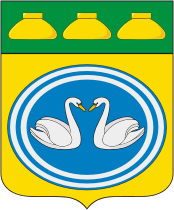
- Flag Coat of arms
- Location of Chanovsky District in Novosibirsk Oblast
- Coordinates: 55°19′N 76°45′E
- Country: Russia
- Federal subject: Novosibirsk Oblast
- Established: 1925
- Administrative center: Chany

Area
  - Total: 5,515 km^{2} (2,129 sq mi)

Population (2010 Census)
  - Total: 25,523
  - Density: 4.628/km^{2} (11.99/sq mi)
  - Urban: 33.2%
  - Rural: 66.8%

Administrative structure
  - Inhabited localities: 1 urban-type settlements, 65 rural localities

Municipal structure
  - Municipally incorporated as: Chanovsky Municipal District
  - Municipal divisions: 1 urban settlements, 13 rural settlements
- Time zone: UTC+7 (MSK+4)
- OKTMO ID: 50656000
- Website: http://www.chany.nso.ru/

Chanovsky District (Russian: Ча́новский райо́н) is an administrative and municipal district (raion), one of the thirty in Novosibirsk Oblast, Russia. It is located in the west of the oblast. The area of the district is 5,515 square kilometers (2,129 sq mi). Its administrative center is the urban locality (a work settlement) of Chany. Population: 25,523 (2010 Census); 29,391 (2002 census); 34,199 (1989 Soviet census). The population of Chany accounts for 33.2% of the district's total population.

== Notable residents ==
- Zhanna Bolotova (born 1941), Soviet film actress, People's Artist of Russia
