= Yasnogorsky (rural locality) =

Yasnogorsky (Russian: Ясногорский; masculine), Yasnogorskaya (Ясногорская; feminine), or Yasnogorskoye (Ясногорское; neuter) is the name of several rural localities in Russia:

- Yasnogorsky, Kemerovo Oblast, a settlement in Yasnogorskaya Rural Territory of Kemerovsky District of Kemerovo Oblast
- Yasnogorsky, Orenburg Oblast, a settlement in Yasnogorsky Selsoviet of Novosergiyevsky District of Orenburg Oblast
