= Stantsionno-Oyashinsky =

Stantsionno-Oyashinsky Станционно-Ояшинский
- Urban-type settlement
- Interactive map of Stantsionno-Oyashinsky
- Location of Stantsionno-Oyashinsky Stantsionno-Oyashinsky (Novosibirsk Oblast)
- Coordinates: 55.4649°N 83.8227°E
- Country: Russia
- Federal subject: Novosibirsk Oblast
- Administrative district: Moshkovsky District
- Elevation: 176 m (577 ft)

Population (2010 Census)
  - Total: 4,575
  - Estimate (2021): 4,178 (−8.7%)
- Time zone: UTC+7 (MSK+4)
- Postal code: 633150
- OKTMO ID: 50638154051

Stantsionno-Oyashinsky (Russian: Станционно-Ояшинский) is an urban locality (an urban-type settlement) in Moshkovsky District of Novosibirsk Oblast, Russia. Population: 4,575 (2010 census); 4,750 (2002 census); 4,875 (1989 Soviet census).
