= Tatarsky District =

Tatarsky District Татарский район (Russian)
- District
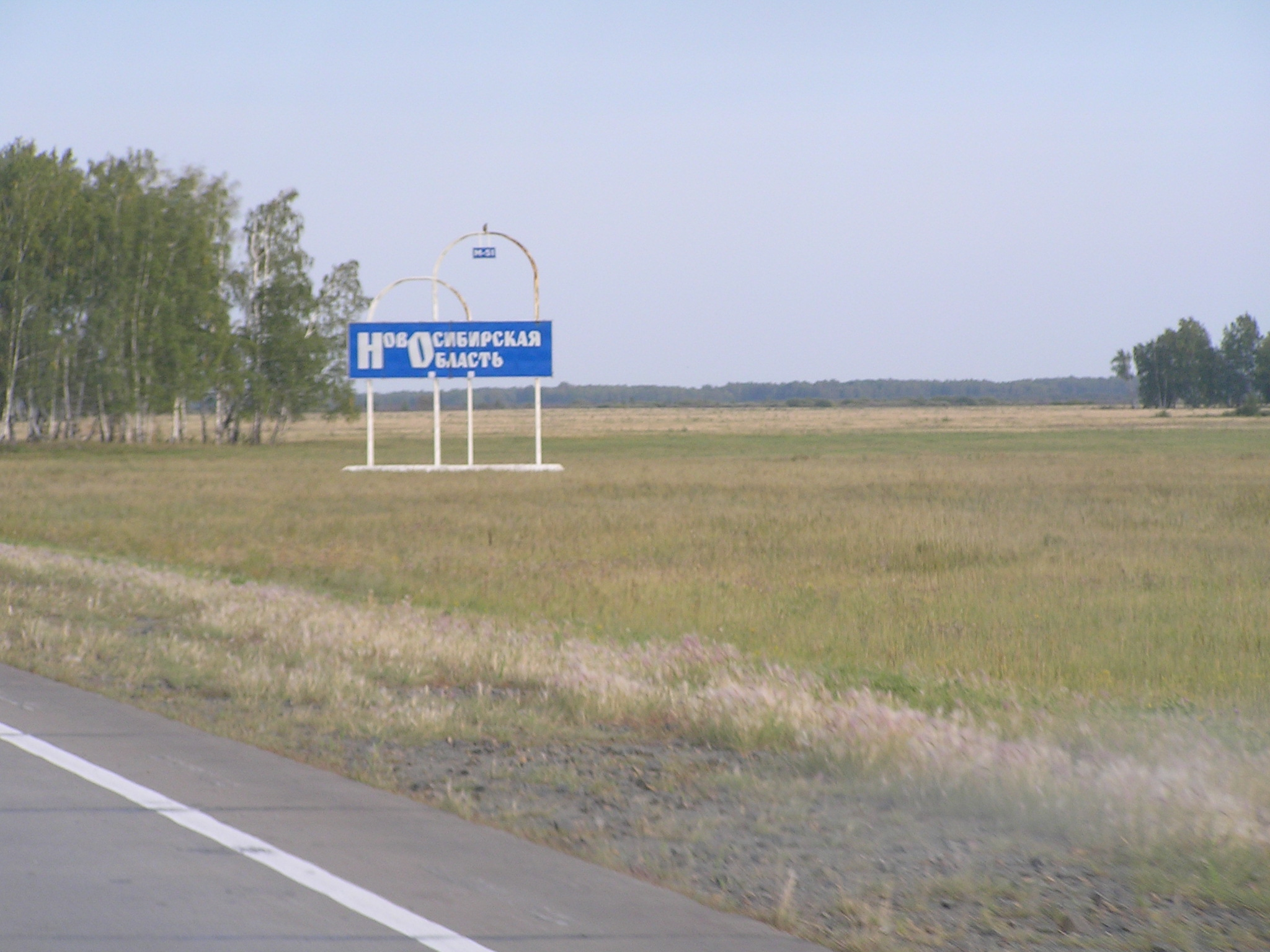
- Landscape in Tatarsky District

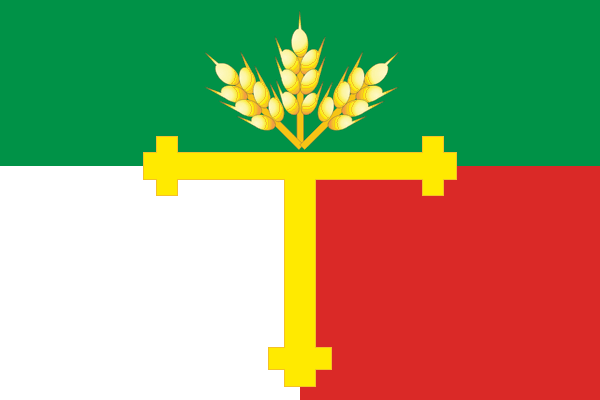
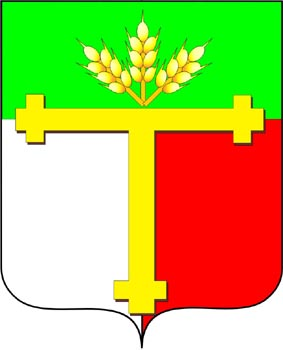
- Flag Coat of arms
- Location of Tatarsky District in Novosibirsk Oblast
- Coordinates: 55°13′N 75°58′E
- Country: Russia
- Federal subject: Novosibirsk Oblast
- Established: 1925
- Administrative center: Tatarsk

Area
  - Total: 4,870 km^{2} (1,880 sq mi)

Population (2010 Census)
  - Total: 15,875
  - Density: 3.26/km^{2} (8.44/sq mi)
  - Urban: 0%
  - Rural: 100%

Administrative structure
  - Inhabited localities: 62 rural localities

Municipal structure
  - Municipally incorporated as: Tatarsky Municipal District
  - Municipal divisions: 1 urban settlements, 21 rural settlements
- Time zone: UTC+7 (MSK+4)
- OKTMO ID: 50650000
- Website: https://regiontatarsk.nso.ru/

Tatarsky District (Russian: Тата́рский райо́н) is an administrative and municipal district (raion), one of the thirty in Novosibirsk Oblast, Russia. It is located in the west of the oblast. The area of the district is 4,870 square kilometers (1,880 sq mi). Its administrative center is the town of Tatarsk (which is not administratively a part of the district). Population: 15,875 (2010 Census); 19,297 (2002 census); 20,718 (1989 Soviet census).

== Administrative and municipal status ==
Within the framework of administrative divisions, Tatar District is one of the thirty in the oblast. The town of Tatarsk serves as its administrative center, despite being incorporated separately as an administrative unit with the status equal to that of the districts.

As a municipal division, the district is incorporated as Tatar Municipal District, with the Town of Tatarsk being incorporated within it as Tatarsk Urban Settlement.
