= Dorogino =

Dorogino Дорогино
- Urban-type settlement
- Interactive map of Dorogino
- Location of Dorogino Dorogino (Novosibirsk Oblast)
- Coordinates: 54.3619°N 83.3179°E
- Country: Russia
- Federal subject: Novosibirsk Oblast
- Administrative district: Cherepanovsky District
- Elevation: 267 m (876 ft)

Population (2010 Census)
  - Total: 3,829
  - Estimate (2025): 4,081 (+6.6%)
- Time zone: UTC+7 (MSK+4)
- Postal code: 633512
- OKTMO ID: 50657154051

Dorogino (Russian: Дорогино) is an urban locality (an urban-type settlement) in Cherepanovsky District of Novosibirsk Oblast, Russia. Population: 3,829 (2010 census); 3,811 (2002 census); 4,132 (1989 Soviet census).
