= Tatarsk, Novosibirsk Oblast =

Town in Russia

Tatarsk Татарск
- Town
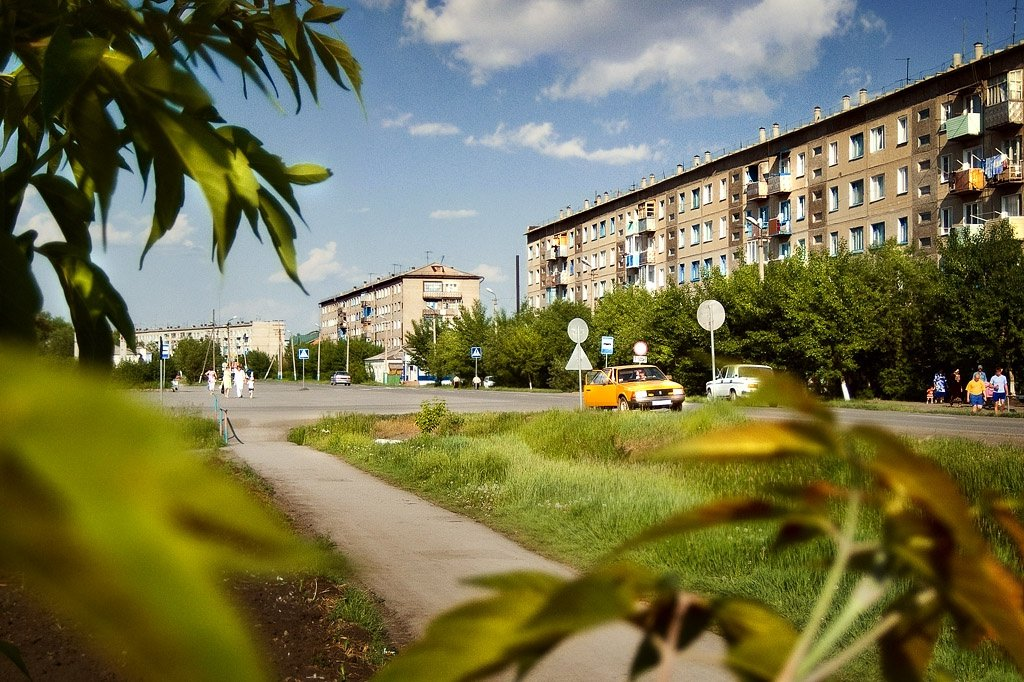
- Lenina Street in Tatarsk

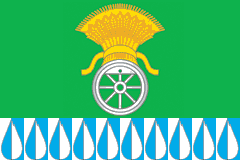
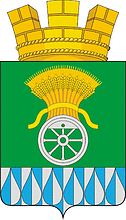
- Flag Coat of arms
- Interactive map of Tatarsk
- Location of Tatarsk Tatarsk (Novosibirsk Oblast)
- Coordinates: 55°15′N 75°59′E
- Country: Russia
- Federal subject: Novosibirsk Oblast
- Founded: 1911
- Town status since: 1925
- Elevation: 105 m (344 ft)

Population (2010 Census)
  - Total: 24,217
  - Estimate (2021): 23,711 (−2.1%)

Administrative status
  - Subordinated to: Town of Tatarsk
  - Capital of: Town of Tatarsk, Tatarsky District

Municipal status
  - Municipal district: Tatarsky Municipal District
  - Urban settlement: Tatarsk Urban Settlement
  - Capital of: Tatarsky Municipal District, Tatarsk Urban Settlement
- Time zone: UTC+7 (MSK+4)
- Postal codes: 632120–632122, 632124–632126
- OKTMO ID: 50650101001

Tatarsk (Russian: Тата́рск) is a town in Novosibirsk Oblast, Russia, located 457 kilometers (284 mi) west of Novosibirsk, the administrative center of the oblast. Population: 24,217 (2010 census); 26,051 (2002 census); 30,355 (1989 Soviet census); 31,000 (1974).

== History ==
Tatarsk is named after Baraba Tatars, the indigenous inhabitants of the Baraba steppe. It was founded in 1911 by merging the settlements of Staraya Tatarka (Старая Татарка) and Stantsionny (Станционный). It was granted town status in 1925.

== Administrative and municipal status ==
Within the framework of administrative divisions, Tatarsk serves as the administrative center of Tatarsky District, even though it is not a part of it. As an administrative division, it is incorporated separately as the Town of Tatarsk—an administrative unit with the status equal to that of the districts. As a municipal division, Tatarsk is incorporated within Tatarsky Municipal District as Tatarsk Urban Settlement.

== Climate ==
Climate data for Tatarsk (1991-2020, extremes 1899-present)
Month	Jan	Feb	Mar	Apr	May	Jun	Jul	Aug	Sep	Oct	Nov	Dec	Year
Record high °C (°F)	3.3 (37.9)	6.2 (43.2)	12.6 (54.7)	30.3 (86.5)	36.5 (97.7)	38.8 (101.8)	41.0 (105.8)	36.7 (98.1)	33.6 (92.5)	25.3 (77.5)	13.1 (55.6)	5.0 (41.0)	41.0 (105.8)
Mean daily maximum °C (°F)	−13.1 (8.4)	−10.2 (13.6)	−1.8 (28.8)	10.4 (50.7)	19.9 (67.8)	24.5 (76.1)	26.0 (78.8)	23.4 (74.1)	16.8 (62.2)	8.4 (47.1)	−3.6 (25.5)	−10.4 (13.3)	7.5 (45.5)
Daily mean °C (°F)	−17.7 (0.1)	−15.1 (4.8)	−7.1 (19.2)	4.2 (39.6)	12.3 (54.1)	17.6 (63.7)	19.3 (66.7)	16.6 (61.9)	10.2 (50.4)	3.3 (37.9)	−7.3 (18.9)	−14.6 (5.7)	1.8 (35.2)
Mean daily minimum °C (°F)	−21.7 (−7.1)	−19.4 (−2.9)	−11.7 (10.9)	−0.5 (31.1)	5.9 (42.6)	11.4 (52.5)	13.6 (56.5)	10.9 (51.6)	5.2 (41.4)	−0.5 (31.1)	−10.5 (13.1)	−18.5 (−1.3)	−3.0 (26.6)
Record low °C (°F)	−46.4 (−51.5)	−45.2 (−49.4)	−42.5 (−44.5)	−27.9 (−18.2)	−13.4 (7.9)	−2.9 (26.8)	1.2 (34.2)	−5.1 (22.8)	−8.3 (17.1)	−28.7 (−19.7)	−41.3 (−42.3)	−48.4 (−55.1)	−48.4 (−55.1)
Average precipitation mm (inches)	19.7 (0.78)	15.8 (0.62)	14.7 (0.58)	23.4 (0.92)	28.4 (1.12)	48.7 (1.92)	66.6 (2.62)	56.3 (2.22)	33.0 (1.30)	26.8 (1.06)	32.5 (1.28)	26.6 (1.05)	392.5 (15.47)
Source: pogoda.ru.net
