= Bugotak Hills =

Hills in Novosibirsk Oblast, Russia

- Буготакские сопки
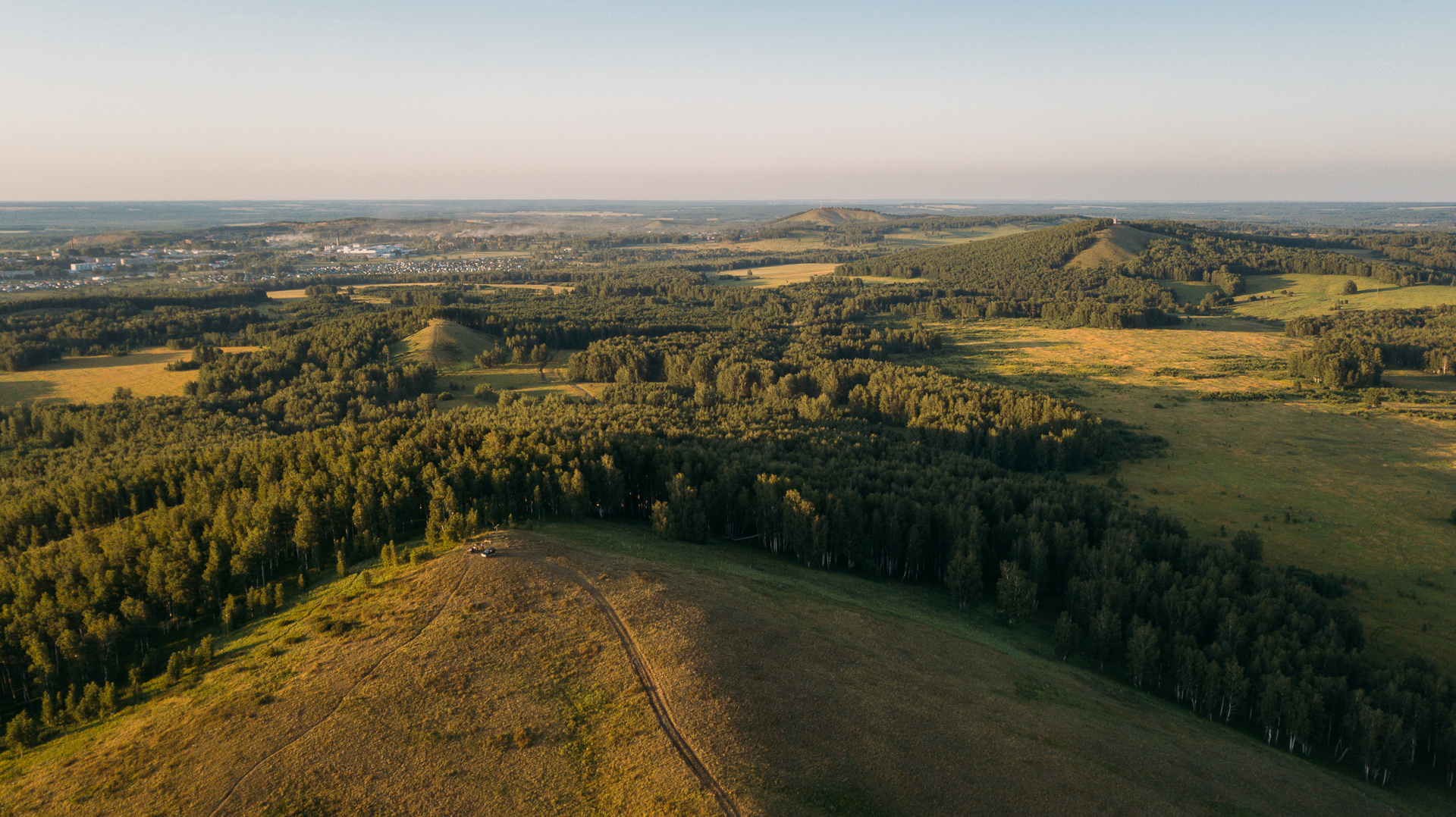
- View of the Lysaya Hill

Geography
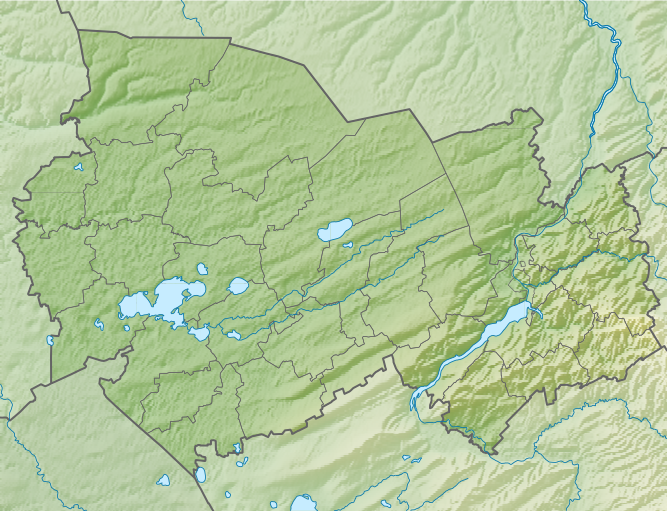
- Location within Novosibirsk Oblast Location within Russia
- Country: Russia
- Region: Novosibirsk Oblast
- District: Toguchinsky District
- Range coordinates: 54°54′N 83°39′E

Bugotak Hills (Russian: Буготакские сопки) are a series of hills in Toguchinsky District of Novosibirsk Oblast, Russia. The hills are a natural monument of regional significance with an area of 701.0 hectares.

== Location ==
The Bugotak Hills are located within the Kolyvan–Tomsk folded zone in the east of Novosibirsk Oblast, the ridge of hills is an S-shaped line 100 km long, which extends from northeast to southwest.

== Hills (from northeast to southwest) ==
- Bolshaya (362 m), there is a ski track on the northern slope.
- Mokhnataya (375 m), there is a radio station building on the top of the hill.
- Konstantinovskaya, it is located between Mokhnataya and Lysaya hills.
- Lysaya (352 m), an Orthodox cross is situated on the top of the hill.
- Kholodnaya, previously, the hill had a height of 381 m and was the highest hill in this region. There is a quarry for the extraction of building materials on the top of the hill.
- A small unnamed hill is located south-west of Lysaya and Kholodnaya hills.
- Rogachyov Hill (323 m)
- Potapov Hill (232 m)
- Zonov Hill, it is located near Ulantova Mountain.
