= Barsukovskaya Cave =

Cave and archaeological site in Russia

- Барсуковская пещера (Russian)
- Type: karst cave
- Location: Russia, Novosibirsk Oblast

Barsukovskaya Cave is a karst cave in Maslyaninsky District of Novosibirsk Oblast. Its length is more than 100 meters. The depth of the cave is 19 meters.

== Fauna ==
Barsukovskaya cave is the habitat of the largest wintering colony of bats in the southeast part of Western Siberia.
