= Posevnaya =

Posevnaya Посевная
- Urban-type settlement
- Interactive map of Posevnaya
- Location of Posevnaya Posevnaya (Novosibirsk Oblast)
- Coordinates: 54.3005°N 83.3306°E
- Country: Russia
- Federal subject: Novosibirsk Oblast
- Administrative district: Cherepanovsky District
- Elevation: 261 m (856 ft)

Population (2010 Census)
  - Total: 4,254
  - Estimate (2025): 4,571 (+7.5%)
- Time zone: UTC+7 (MSK+4)
- Postal code: 633511
- OKTMO ID: 50657163051

Posevnaya (Russian: Посевная) is an urban locality (an urban-type settlement) in Cherepanovsky District of Novosibirsk Oblast, Russia. Population: 4,254 (2010 census); 4,323 (2002 census); 4,923 (1989 Soviet census).
