= Chik (urban-type settlement) =

Urban locality in Novosibirsk Oblast, Russia

Coordinates: 54°59′36″N 82°26′20″E

Chik (Russian: Чик) is an urban-type settlement in Kochenyovsky District, Novosibirsk Oblast, Russia. Population: 5,009 (2010 census); 5,056 (2002 census); 5,004 (1989 Soviet census).
