= Maslyaninsky District =

Maslyaninsky District Маслянинский район (Russian)
- District
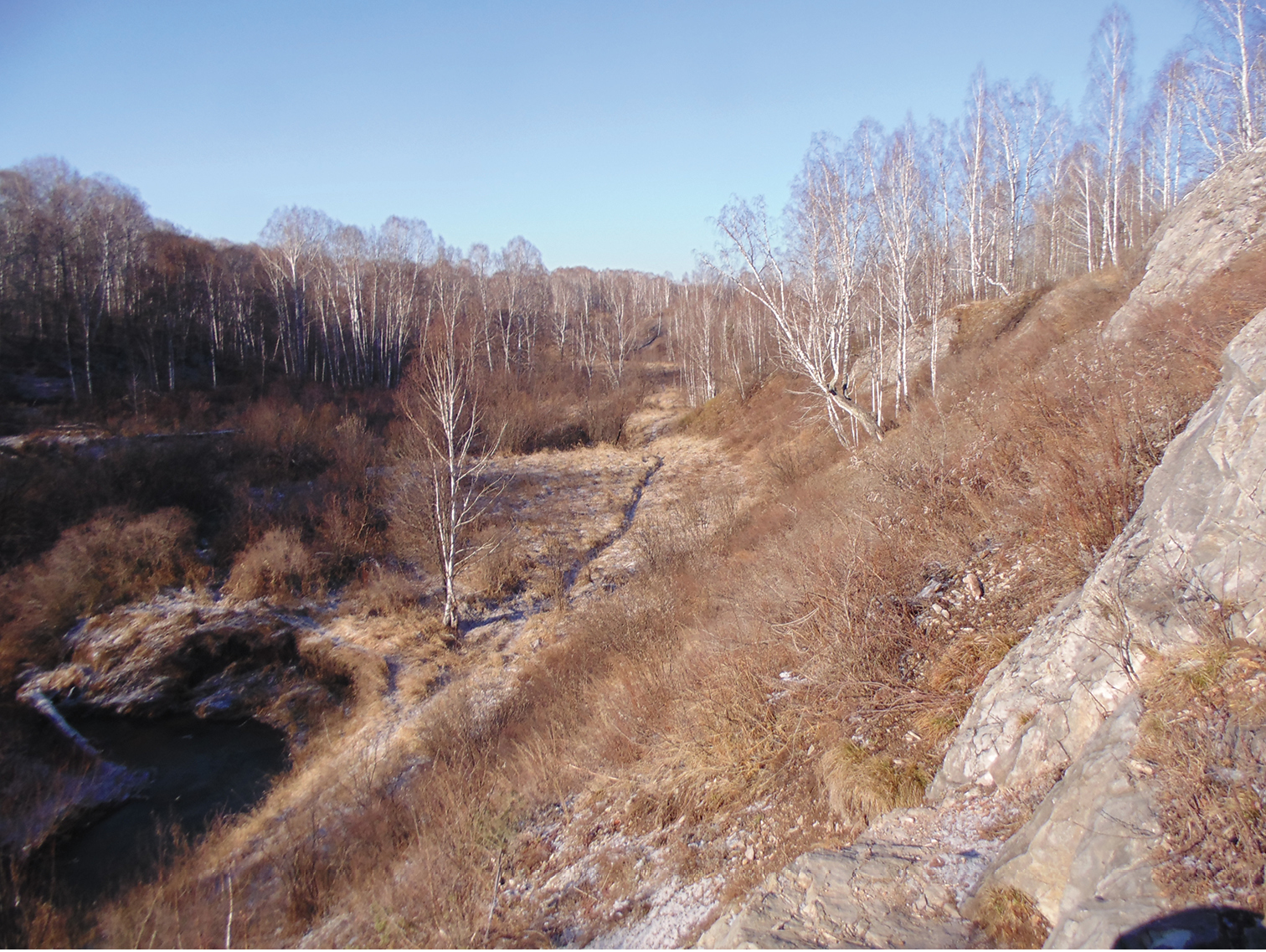
- near Barsukovskaya Cave

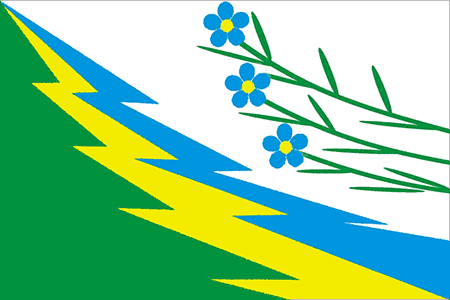
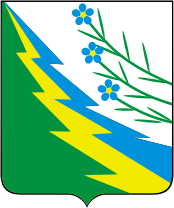
- Flag Coat of arms
- Location of Maslyaninsky District in Novosibirsk Oblast
- Coordinates: 54°20′04″N 84°12′59″E
- Country: Russia
- Federal subject: Novosibirsk Oblast
- Established: 1924
- Administrative center: Maslyanino

Area
  - Total: 3,453 km^{2} (1,333 sq mi)

Population (2010 Census)
  - Total: 24,438
  - Density: 7.077/km^{2} (18.33/sq mi)
  - Urban: 53.6%
  - Rural: 46.4%

Administrative structure
  - Inhabited localities: 1 urban-type settlements, 29 rural localities

Municipal structure
  - Municipally incorporated as: Maslyaninsky Municipal District
  - Municipal divisions: 1 urban settlements, 11 rural settlements
- Time zone: UTC+7 (MSK+4)
- OKTMO ID: 50636000
- Website: http://maslyanino.nso.ru

Maslyaninsky District (Russian: Масля́нинский райо́н) is an administrative and municipal district (raion), one of the thirty in Novosibirsk Oblast, Russia. It is located in the east of the oblast. The area of the district is 3,453 square kilometers (1,333 sq mi). Its administrative center is the urban locality (a work settlement) of Maslyanino. Population: 24,438 (2010 Census); 27,196 (2002 census); 26,421 (1989 Soviet census). The population of Maslyanino accounts for 53.6% of the district's total population.

== Natural monuments ==
Barsukovskaya Cave is a Karst cave, the habitat of the largest wintering colony of bats in the southeast part of Western Siberia.

== Notable residents ==
- Grigoriy Krivosheyev (1929–2019), Colonel General and military historian, born in the village of Kinterep, Legostayevsky
