= Cherepanovo, Vologda Oblast =

Cherepanovo Черепаново
- Village
- Location within Vologda Oblast Location within Russia
- Coordinates: 59°19′N 36°43′E
- Country: Russia
- Region: Vologda Oblast
- District: Kaduysky District
- Time zone: UTC+3:00

Cherepanovo (Russian: Черепаново) is a rural locality (a village) in Semizerye Rural Settlement, Kaduysky District, Vologda Oblast, Russia. The population was 5 as of 2002.

== Geography ==
Cherepanovo is located 34 km northwest of Kaduy (the district's administrative centre) by road. Maza is the nearest rural locality.
