= Linyovo, Novosibirsk Oblast =

Urban locality in Novosibirsk Oblast, Russia

Linyovo Линёво
- Urban-type settlement
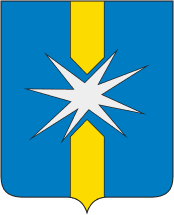
- Flag Coat of arms
- Interactive map of Linyovo
- Location of Linyovo Linyovo (Novosibirsk Oblast)
- Coordinates: 54°27′28″N 83°22′40″E
- Country: Russia
- Federal subject: Novosibirsk Oblast
- Administrative district: Iskitimsky District
- Founded: 1974
- Elevation: 215 m (705 ft)

Population (2010 Census)
  - Total: 20,707
  - Estimate (2025): 17,521 (−15.4%)
- Time zone: UTC+7 (MSK+4)
- Postal code: 633216
- OKTMO ID: 50615152051

Linyovo (Russian: Линёво) is an urban-type settlement in Iskitimsky District, Novosibirsk Oblast, Russia. Population: 20,707 (2010 census); 21,816 (2002 census); 22,310 (1989 Soviet census).
