= Cherepanovo, Republic of Bashkortostan =

Cherepanovo Черепаново
- Village
- Location within Bashkortostan Location within Russia
- Coordinates: 55°13′N 58°06′E
- Country: Russia
- Region: Bashkortostan
- District: Salavatsky District
- Time zone: UTC+5:00

Cherepanovo (Russian: Черепаново) is a rural locality (a village) in Maloyazovsky Selsoviet, Salavatsky District, Bashkortostan, Russia. The population was 54 as of 2010. There are 3 streets.

== Geography ==
Cherepanovo is located 14 km northwest of Maloyaz (the district's administrative centre) by road. Pokrovka is the nearest rural locality.
