= Kochenyovo =

Urban locality in Novosibirsk Oblast, Russia

Kochenyovo Коченёво
- Urban-type settlement
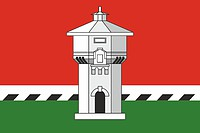
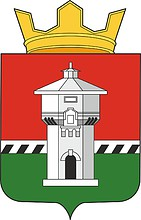
- Flag Coat of arms
- Interactive map of Kochenyovo
- Location of Kochenyovo Kochenyovo (Novosibirsk Oblast)
- Coordinates: 55°01′01″N 82°12′31″E
- Country: Russia
- Federal subject: Novosibirsk Oblast
- Administrative district: Kochenyovsky District
- Founded: 1650
- Elevation: 150 m (490 ft)

Population (2010 Census)
  - Total: 16,374
  - Estimate (2021): 17,053 (+4.1%)
- Time zone: UTC+7 (MSK+4)
- Postal code: 632640
- OKTMO ID: 50623151051

Kochenyovo (Russian: Коченёво) is an urban-type settlement and the administrative center of Kochenyovsky District, Novosibirsk Oblast, Russia. Population: 16,374 (2010 census); 16,510 (2002 census); 15,048 (1989 Soviet census).

== Media ==
- Kochenyovskiye Vesti is a newspaper founded in 1932. It is published once a week.

== Notable people ==
- Origa – Singer-songwriter, musician, composer
