= Cherepanovo, Vereshchaginsky District, Perm Krai =

Cherepanovo Черепаново
- Village
- Location within Perm Krai Location within Russia
- Coordinates: 58°02′N 54°18′E
- Country: Russia
- Region: Perm Krai
- District: Vereshchaginsky District
- Time zone: UTC+5:00

Cherepanovo (Russian: Черепаново) is a rural locality (a village) in Vereshchaginsky District, Perm Krai, Russia. The population was 8 as of 2010.

== Geography ==
Cherepanovo is located 28 km west of Vereshchagino (the district's administrative centre) by road. Shavrino is the nearest rural locality.
