= Kochenyovsky District =

Kochenyovsky District Коченёвский район (Russian)
- District
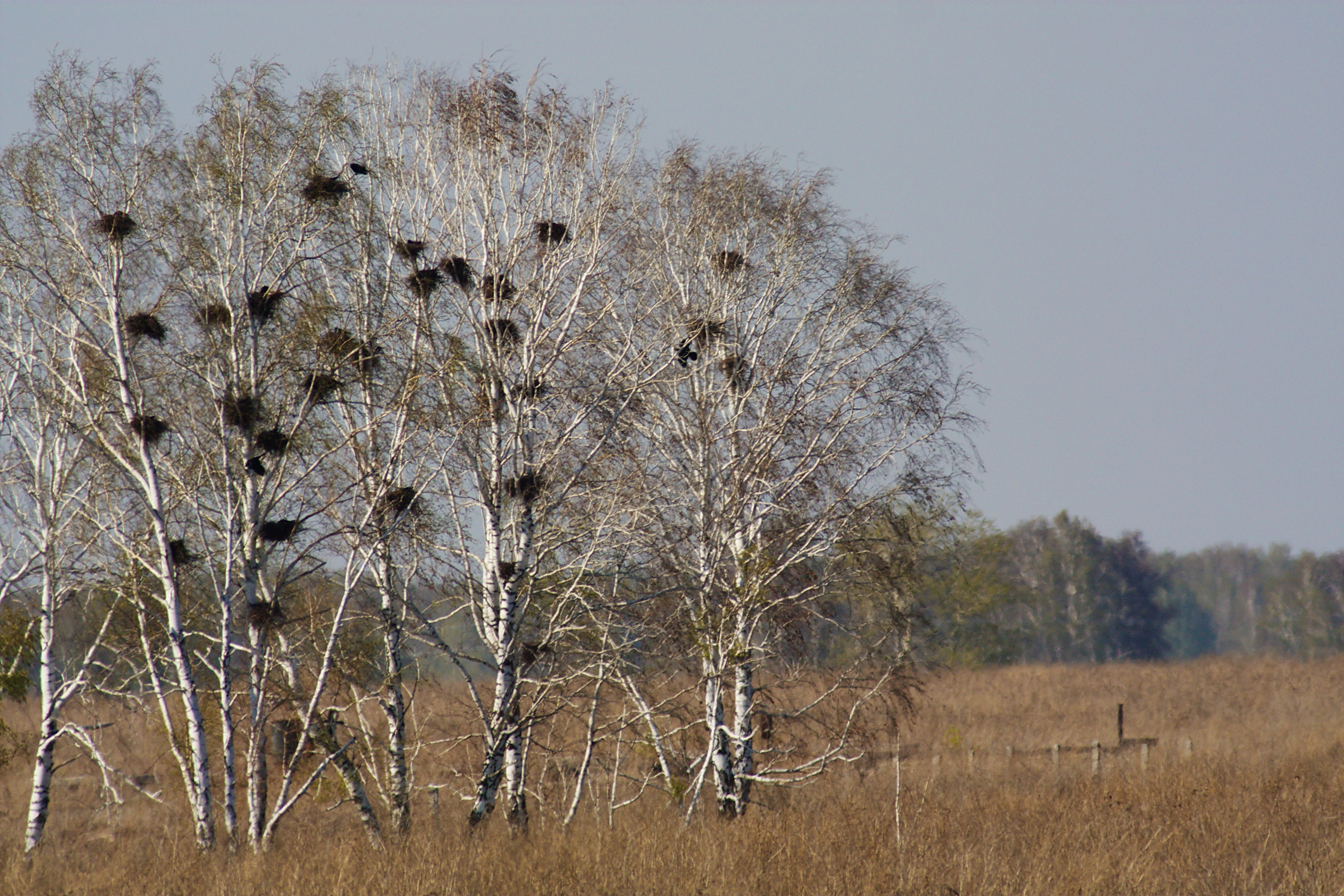
- Clumped nests (rookery) of Rooks (Corvus frugilegus) in Silver Birch (Betula pendula), Kochenyovsky District

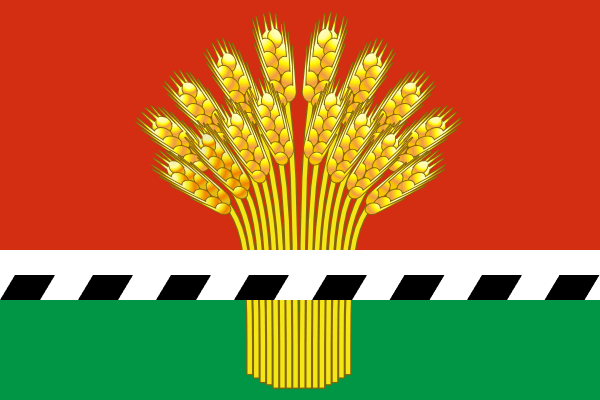
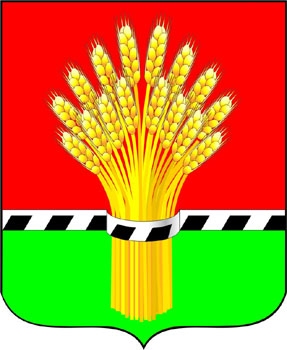
- Flag Coat of arms
- Location of Kochenyovsky District in Novosibirsk Oblast
- Coordinates: 55°01′N 82°13′E
- Country: Russia
- Federal subject: Novosibirsk Oblast
- Established: 1924
- Administrative center: Kochenyovo

Area
  - Total: 5,072 km^{2} (1,958 sq mi)

Population (2010 Census)
  - Total: 43,850
  - Density: 8.646/km^{2} (22.39/sq mi)
  - Urban: 48.8%
  - Rural: 51.2%

Administrative structure
  - Inhabited localities: 2 urban-type settlements, 57 rural localities

Municipal structure
  - Municipally incorporated as: Kochenyovsky Municipal District
  - Municipal divisions: 2 urban settlements, 14 rural settlements
- Time zone: UTC+7 (MSK+4)
- OKTMO ID: 50623000
- Website: http://www.kochenevo.nso.ru/

Kochenyovsky District (Russian: Коченёвский райо́н) is an administrative and municipal district (raion), one of the thirty in Novosibirsk Oblast, Russia. It is located in the eastern central part of the oblast. The area of the district is 5,072 square kilometers (1,958 sq mi). Its administrative center is the urban locality (a work settlement) of Kochenyovo. Population: 43,850 (2010 Census); 46,378 (2002 census); 46,148 (1989 Soviet census). The population of Kochenyovo accounts for 37.3% of the district's total population.
