= Novosergiyevka, Novosergiyevsky District, Orenburg Oblast =

Human settlement in Orenburg Oblast, Russia

Coordinates: 52°5′23″N 53°38′38″E

Novosergiyevka (Russian: Новосергиевка) is a rural locality (a selo) and the administrative center of Novosergiyevsky District of Orenburg Oblast, Russia. Population: 13,737 (2010 census); 13,261 (2002 census); 12,624 (1989 Soviet census).
