= Toguchin =

Town in Novosibirsk Oblast, Russia

Toguchin Тогучин
- Town
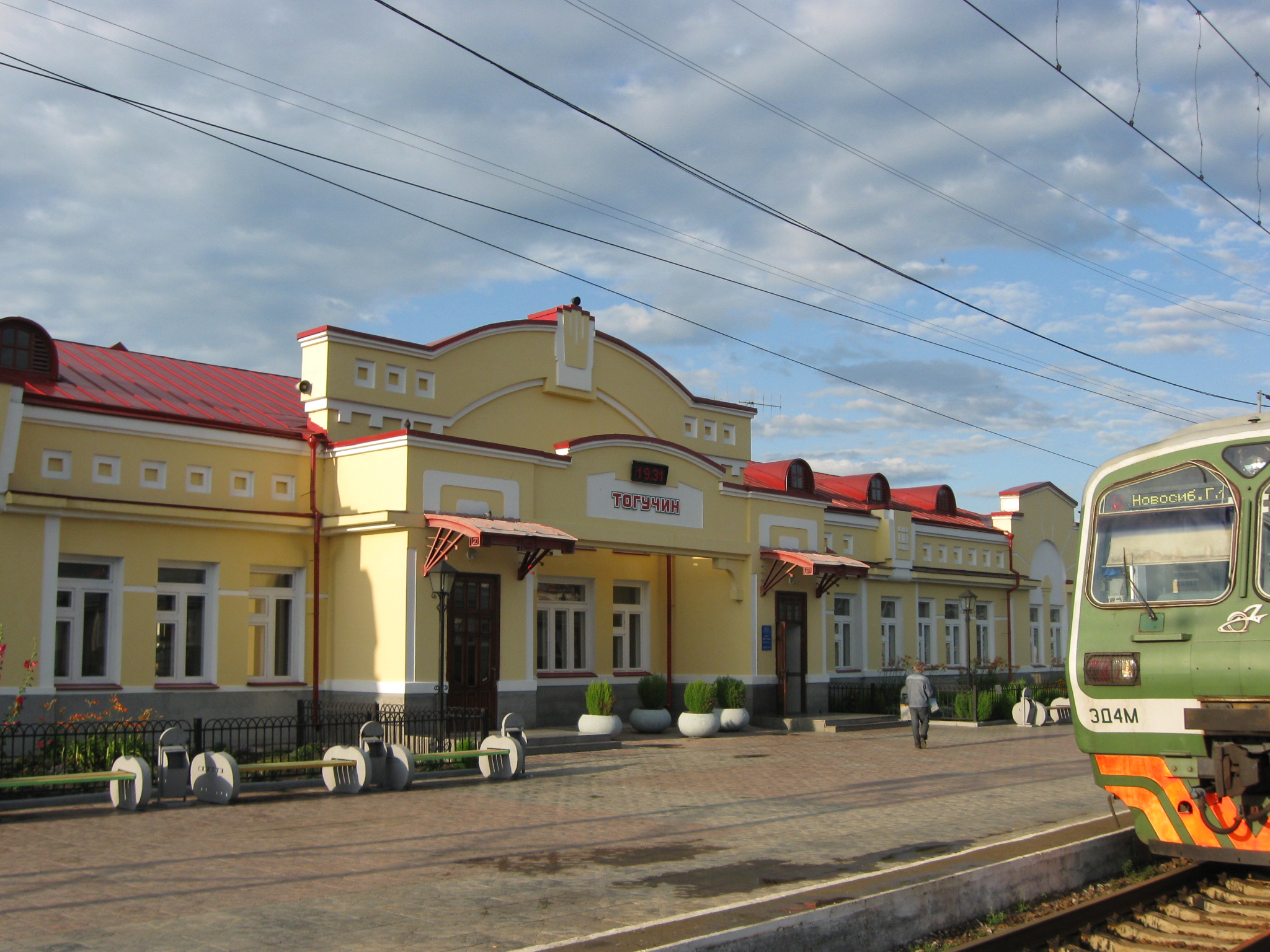
- Railway station in Toguchin

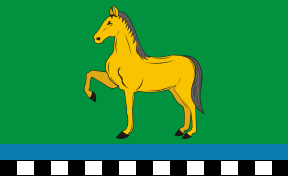
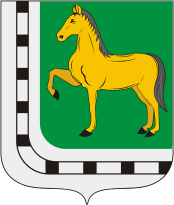
- Flag Coat of arms
- Interactive map of Toguchin
- Location of Toguchin Toguchin (Novosibirsk Oblast)
- Coordinates: 55°14′N 84°25′E
- Country: Russia
- Federal subject: Novosibirsk Oblast
- Administrative district: Toguchinsky District
- TownSelsoviet: Toguchin
- Founded: 17th century
- Town status since: 1945
- Elevation: 150 m (490 ft)

Population (2010 Census)
  - Total: 21,900
  - Estimate (2021): 20,766 (−5.2%)

Administrative status
  - Capital of: Toguchinsky District, Town of Toguchin

Municipal status
  - Municipal district: Toguchinsky Municipal District
  - Urban settlement: Toguchin Urban Settlement
  - Capital of: Toguchinsky Municipal District, Toguchin Urban Settlement
- Time zone: UTC+7 (MSK+4)
- Postal codes: 633450–633454, 633456
- OKTMO ID: 50652101001

Toguchin (Russian: Тогучи́н) is a town and the administrative center of Toguchinsky District in Novosibirsk Oblast, Russia, located on the Inya River (Ob's tributary) 125 kilometers (78 mi) east of Novosibirsk, the administrative center of the oblast. Population: 21,900 (2010 census); 22,179 (2002 census); 23,189 (1989 Soviet census).

== History ==
The town of Toguchin was founded in the vicinity of the Chat Tatar village of the same name. In 1899 there lived 309 Russians and 331 Chat Tatars.

The village of the same name was firstly mentioned in 1720.

== Administrative and municipal status ==
Within the framework of administrative divisions, Toguchin serves as the administrative center of Toguchinsky District. As an administrative division, it is incorporated within Toguchinsky District as the Town of Toguchin. As a municipal division, the Town of Toguchin is incorporated within Toguchinsky Municipal District as Toguchin Urban Settlement.

== Economy ==
Town's industrial facilities include a water-accumulator installations plant, a wood-processing factory, a fruit-and-vegetable processing plant, a bread-making plant, a beverage plant, a dairy factory, and a hemp-processing plant.
