= Chany =

Chany Чаны
- Urban-type settlement
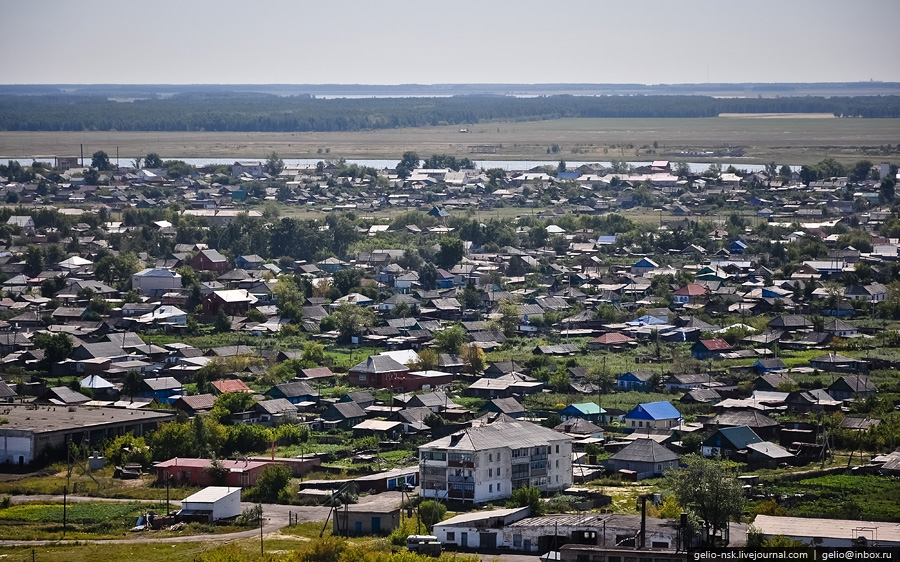
- Interactive map of Chany
- Location of Chany Chany (Novosibirsk Oblast)
- Coordinates: 55°19′N 76°45′E
- Country: Russia
- Federal subject: Novosibirsk Oblast
- Administrative district: Chanovsky District
- Founded: 1875
- Elevation: 110 m (360 ft)

Population (2010 Census)
  - Total: 8,473
  - Estimate (2025): 7,854 (−7.3%)
- Time zone: UTC+7 (MSK+4)
- Postal code: 632200–632299
- OKTMO ID: 50656151051

Chany (Russian: Ча́ны) is an urban locality (a work settlement) and the administrative center of Chanovsky District of Novosibirsk Oblast, Russia. Population: 8,473 (2010 census); 9,039 (2002 census); 9,607 (1989 Soviet census).
