= Toguchinsky District =

Toguchinsky District Тогучинский район (Russian)
- District
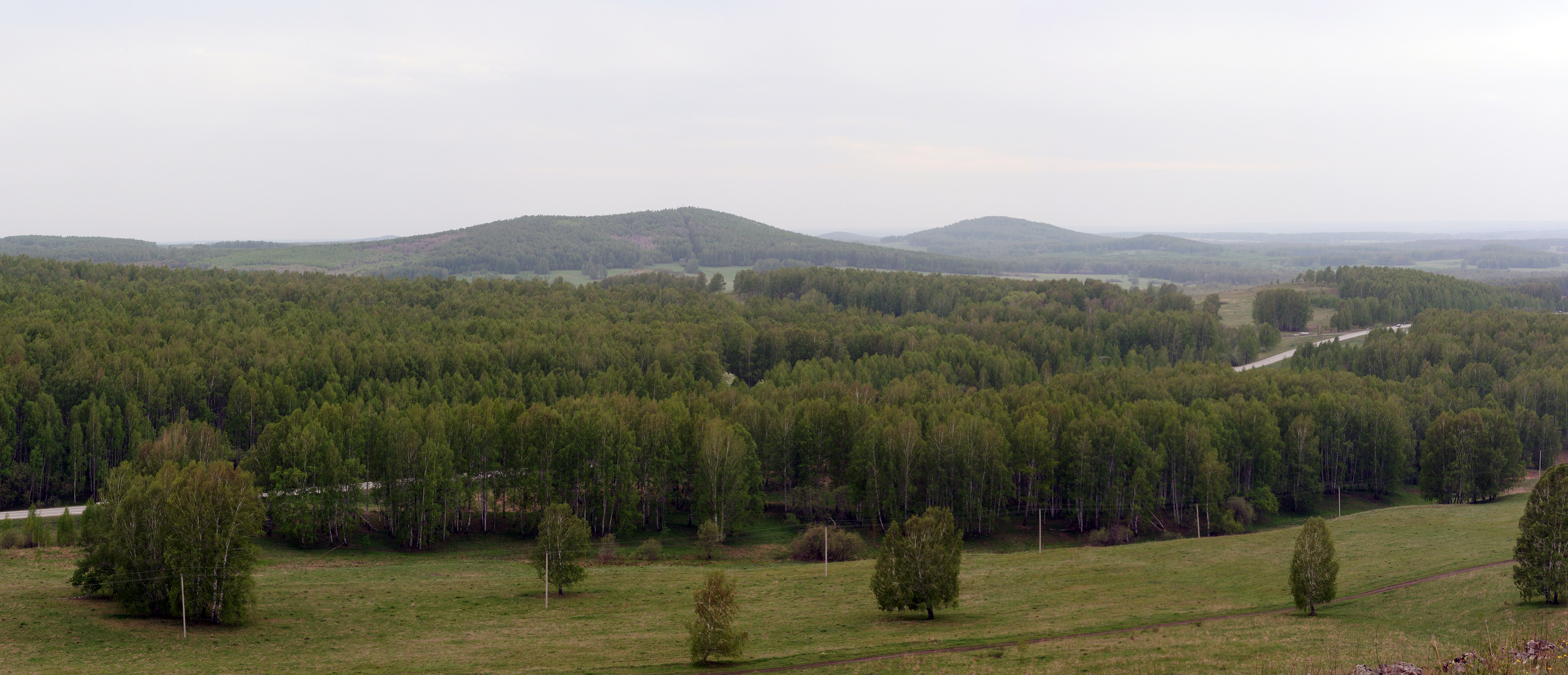
- Bugotak Hills, Toguchinsky District

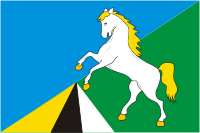
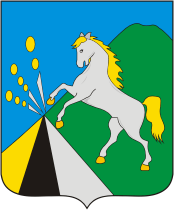
- Flag Coat of arms
- Location of Toguchinsky District in Novosibirsk Oblast
- Coordinates: 55°14′N 84°23′E
- Country: Russia
- Federal subject: Novosibirsk Oblast
- Established: 1929
- Administrative center: Toguchin

Area
  - Total: 3,925 km^{2} (1,515 sq mi)

Population (2010 Census)
  - Total: 60,303
  - Density: 15.36/km^{2} (39.79/sq mi)
  - Urban: 51.9%
  - Rural: 48.1%

Administrative structure
  - Inhabited localities: 1 cities/towns, 1 urban-type settlements, 105 rural localities

Municipal structure
  - Municipally incorporated as: Toguchinsky Municipal District
  - Municipal divisions: 2 urban settlements, 20 rural settlements
- Time zone: UTC+7 (MSK+4)
- OKTMO ID: 50652000
- Website: https://www.toguchin.org/

Toguchinsky District (Russian: Тогучи́нский райо́н) is an administrative and municipal district (raion), one of the thirty in Novosibirsk Oblast, Russia. It is located in the east of the oblast. The area of the district is 3,925 square kilometers (1,515 sq mi). Its administrative center is the town of Toguchin. Population: 60,303 (2010 Census); 65,515 (2002 census); 66,912 (1989 Soviet census). The population of Toguchin accounts for 36.3% of the district's total population.

== Notable residents ==
- Mikheil Potskhveria (born 12 August 1975 in Kurundus), Georgian footballer
