= Maslyanino =

Maslyanino Маслянино
- Urban-type settlement
- Interactive map of Maslyanino
- Location of Maslyanino Maslyanino (Novosibirsk Oblast)
- Coordinates: 54.3464°N 84.2110°E
- Country: Russia
- Federal subject: Novosibirsk Oblast
- Administrative district: Maslyaninsky District
- Founded: 1644
- Elevation: 180 m (590 ft)

Population (2010 Census)
  - Total: 13,102
  - Estimate (2025): 13,114 (+0.1%)
- Time zone: UTC+7 (MSK+4)
- Postal code: 633560–633569
- OKTMO ID: 50636151051

Maslyanino (Russian: Маслянино) is an urban locality (an urban-type settlement) in Maslyaninsky District of Novosibirsk Oblast, Russia. Population: 13,102 (2010 census); 13,565 (2002 census); 12,656 (1989 Soviet census).
