= Cherepanovo, Novosibirsk Oblast =

Town in Novosibirsk Oblast, Russia

Cherepanovo Черепаново
- Town
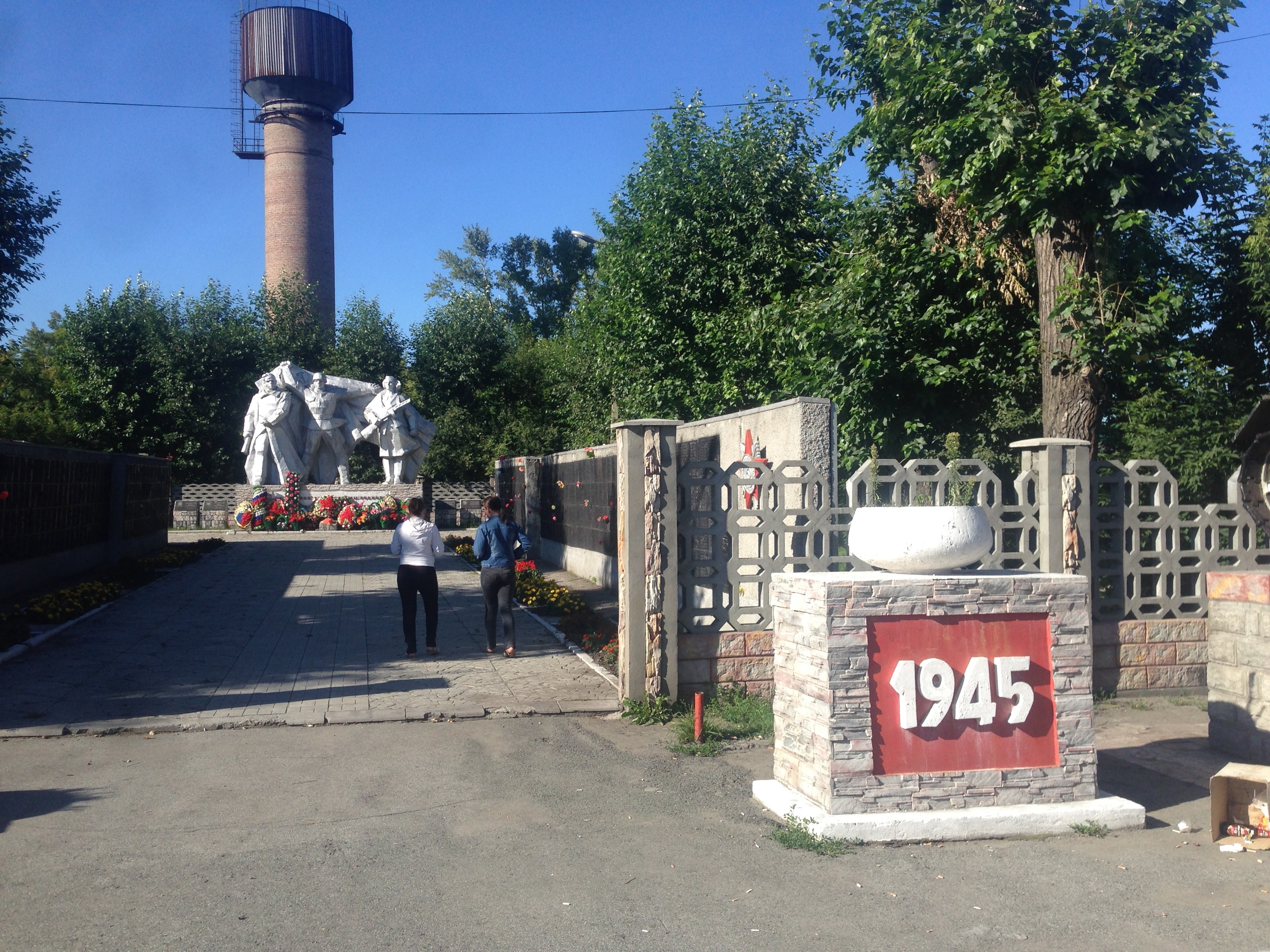
- The gate into a Cherepanovo memorial, Cherepanovo

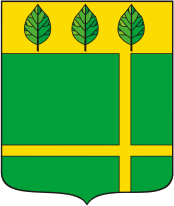
- Coat of arms
- Interactive map of Cherepanovo
- Location of Cherepanovo Cherepanovo (Novosibirsk Oblast)
- Coordinates: 54°14′N 83°22′E
- Country: Russia
- Federal subject: Novosibirsk Oblast
- Administrative district: Cherepanovsky District
- TownSelsoviet: Cherepanovo
- Founded: 1912
- Town status since: 1925
- Elevation: 280 m (920 ft)

Population (2010 Census)
  - Total: 19,803
  - Estimate (2021): 19,900 (+0.5%)

Administrative status
  - Capital of: Cherepanovsky District, Town of Cherepanovo

Municipal status
  - Municipal district: Cherepanovsky Municipal District
  - Urban settlement: Cherepanovo Urban Settlement
  - Capital of: Cherepanovsky Municipal District, Cherepanovo Urban Settlement
- Time zone: UTC+7 (MSK+4)
- Postal codes: 633520–633522, 633529
- OKTMO ID: 50657101001
- Website: web.archive.org/web/20140810135128/http://gorcher.ru/

Cherepanovo (Russian: Черепа́ново) is a town and the administrative center of Cherepanovsky District in Novosibirsk Oblast, Russia, located 109 kilometers (68 mi) southeast of Novosibirsk, the administrative center of the oblast. Population: 19,803 (2010 census); 20,496 (2002 census); 22,116 (1989 Soviet census).

== History ==
It was founded in 1912 due to the construction of a railway between Novonikolayevsk and Barnaul. The Cherepanovo station was opened in 1915. It was granted town status in 1925.

== Administrative and municipal status ==
Within the framework of administrative divisions, Cherepanovo serves as the administrative center of Cherepanovsky District. As an administrative division, it is incorporated within Cherepanovsky District as the Town of Cherepanovo. As a municipal division, the Town of Cherepanovo is incorporated within Cherepanovsky Municipal District as Cherepanovo Urban Settlement.
