= Moshkovsky District =

Moshkovsky District Мошковский район (Russian)
- District
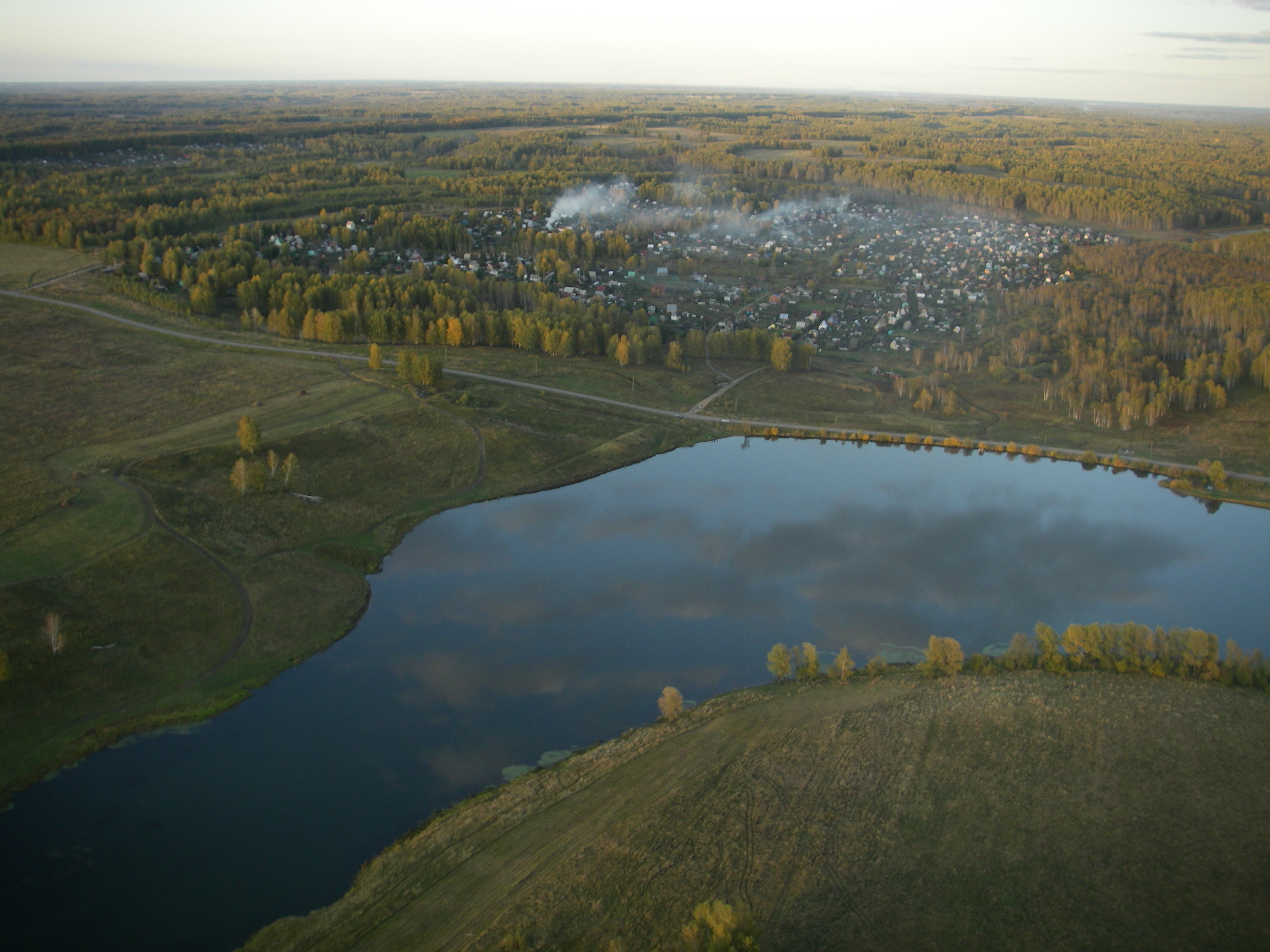
- Landscape in Moshkovsky District

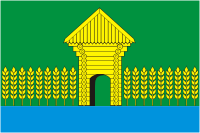
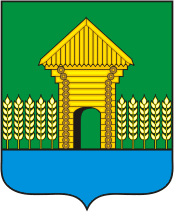
- Flag Coat of arms
- Location of Moshkovsky District in Novosibirsk Oblast
- Coordinates: 55°18′27″N 83°37′15″E
- Country: Russia
- Federal subject: Novosibirsk Oblast
- Established: 1925
- Administrative center: Moshkovo

Area
  - Total: 2,591 km^{2} (1,000 sq mi)

Population (2010 Census)
  - Total: 39,192
  - Density: 15.13/km^{2} (39.18/sq mi)
  - Urban: 37.8%
  - Rural: 62.2%

Administrative structure
  - Inhabited localities: 2 urban-type settlements, 47 rural localities

Municipal structure
  - Municipally incorporated as: Moshkovsky Municipal District
  - Municipal divisions: 2 urban settlements, 9 rural settlements
- Time zone: UTC+7 (MSK+4)
- OKTMO ID: 50638000
- Website: http://www.moshkovo-nso.ru

Moshkovsky District (Russian: Мошко́вский райо́н) is an administrative and municipal district (raion), one of the thirty in Novosibirsk Oblast, Russia. It is located in the northeast of the oblast. The area of the district is 2,591 square kilometers (1,000 sq mi). Its administrative center is the urban locality (a work settlement) of Moshkovo. Population: 39,192 (2010 Census); 41,281 (2002 census); 41,879 (1989 Soviet census). The population of Moshkovo accounts for 26.1% of the district's total population.

== Notable residents ==
- Pavel Prokudin (born 17 August 1966 in Smolensky, Moshkovsky District), Prime Minister of Transnistria 2015–2016
