= Moshkovo, Novosibirsk Oblast =

Moshkovo Мошково
- Urban-type settlement
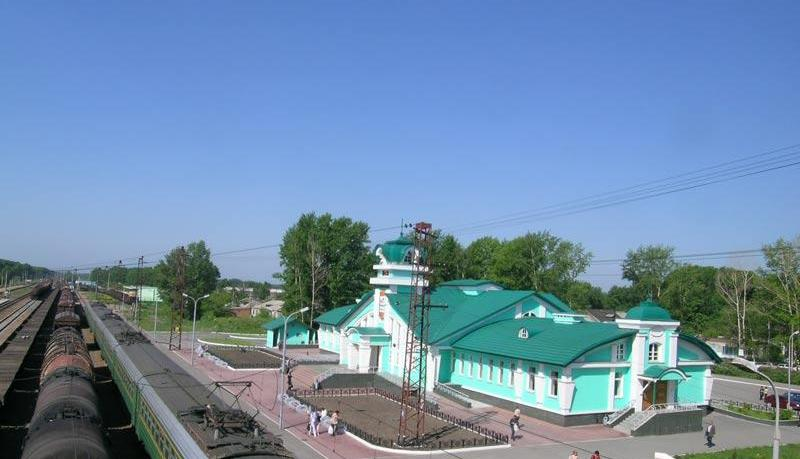

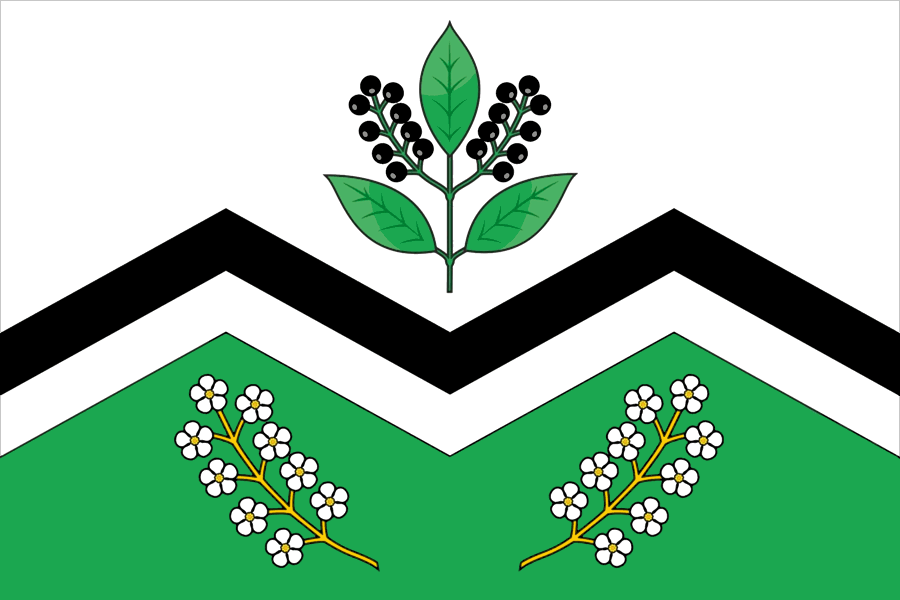
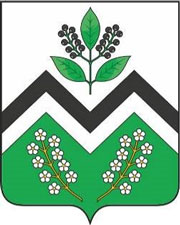
- Flag Coat of arms
- Interactive map of Moshkovo
- Location of Moshkovo Moshkovo (Novosibirsk Oblast)
- Coordinates: 55.3049°N 83.6121°E
- Country: Russia
- Federal subject: Novosibirsk Oblast
- Administrative district: Moshkovsky District
- Founded: 1893
- Elevation: 208 m (682 ft)

Population (2010 Census)
  - Total: 10,224
  - Estimate (2025): 9,377 (−8.3%)
- Time zone: UTC+7 (MSK+4)
- Postal code: 633131
- OKTMO ID: 50638151051

Moshkovo (Russian: Мошково) is an urban locality (an urban-type settlement) and the administrative center of Moshkovsky District of Novosibirsk Oblast, Russia. Population: 10,224 (2010 census); 10,678 (2002 census); 9,571 (1989 Soviet census).
