= Cherepanovsky District =

Cherepanovsky District Черепановский район
- District
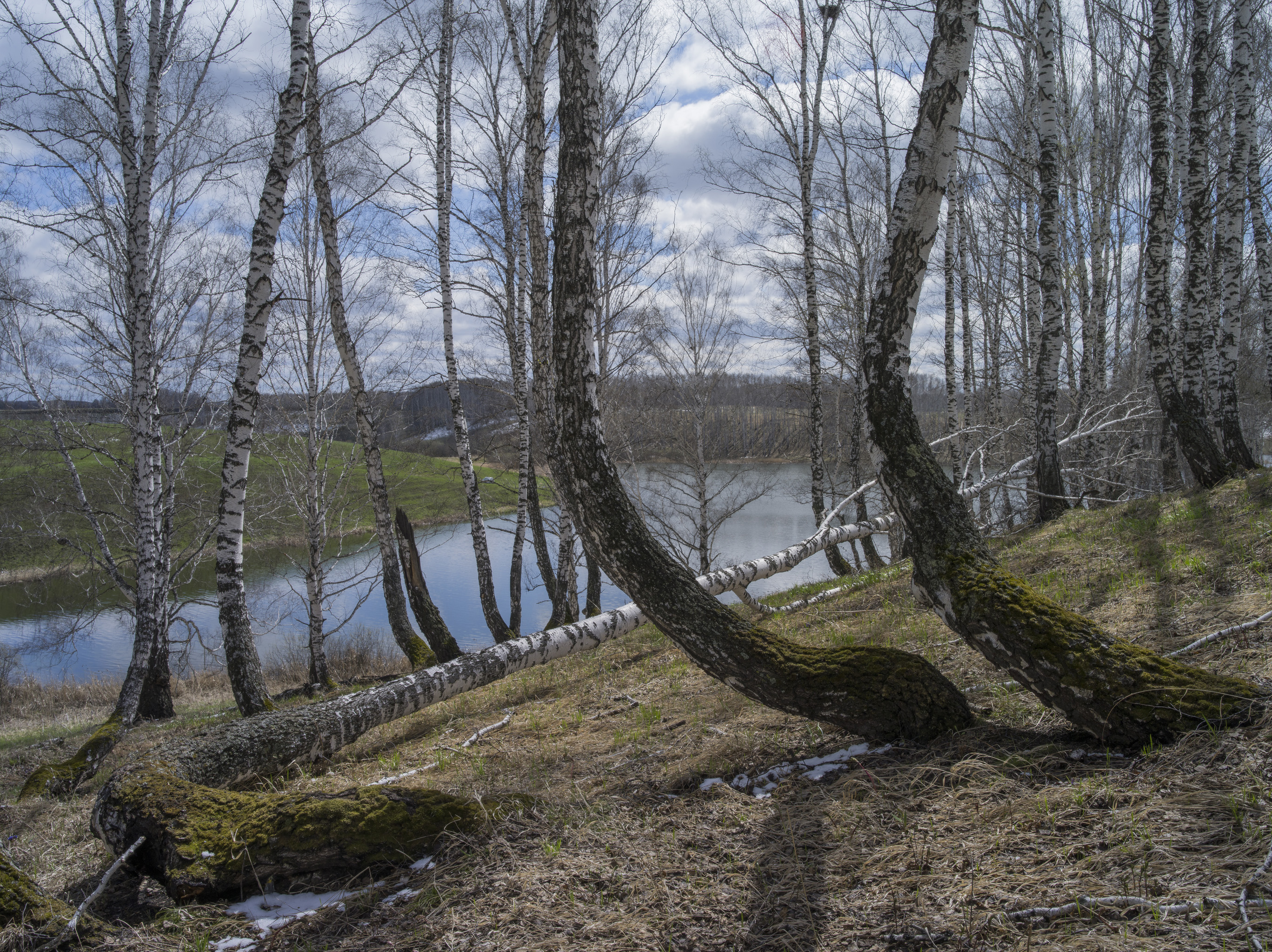

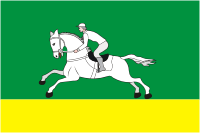
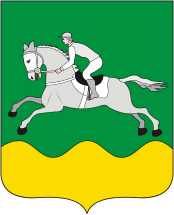
- Flag Coat of arms
- Location of Cherepanovsky District in Novosibirsk Oblast
- Coordinates: 54°13′N 83°22′E
- Country: Russia
- Federal subject: Novosibirsk Oblast
- Established: 1925
- Administrative center: Cherepanovo

Area
  - Total: 2,908 km^{2} (1,123 sq mi)

Population (2010 Census)
  - Total: 47,842
  - Density: 16.45/km^{2} (42.61/sq mi)
  - Urban: 58.3%
  - Rural: 41.7%

Administrative structure
  - Inhabited localities: 1 cities/towns, 2 urban-type settlements, 46 rural localities

Municipal structure
  - Municipally incorporated as: Cherepanovsky Municipal District
  - Municipal divisions: 3 urban settlements, 11 rural settlements
- Time zone: UTC+7 (MSK+4)
- OKTMO ID: 50657000
- Website: http://cherepanovo.nso.ru

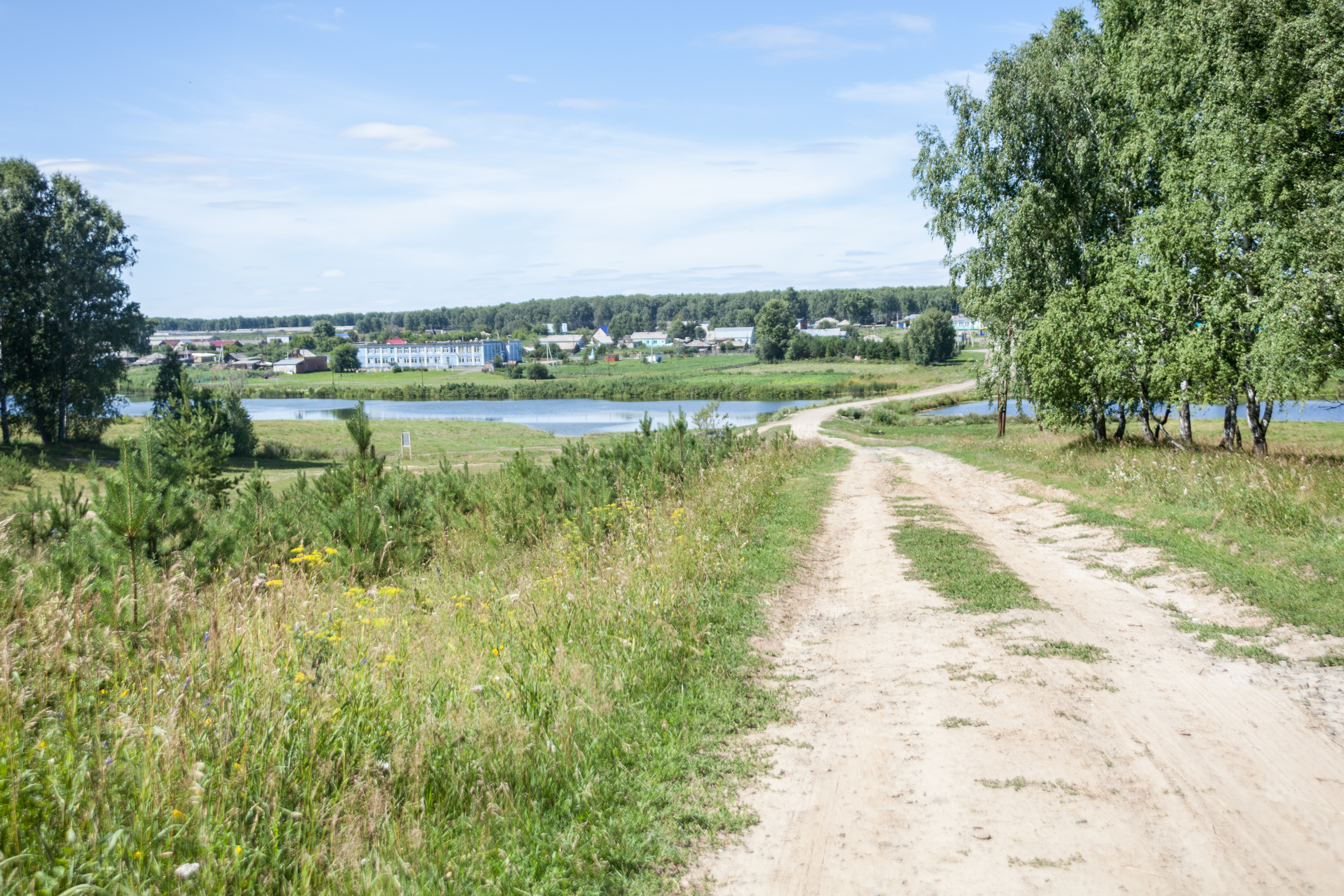
Countryside in Cherapanovsky district

Cherepanovsky District (Russian: Черепа́новский райо́н) is an administrative and municipal district (raion), one of the thirty in Novosibirsk Oblast, Russia. It is located in the southeast of the oblast. The area of the district is 2,908 square kilometers (1,123 sq mi). Its administrative center is the town of Cherepanovo. Population: 47,842 (2010 Census); 50,959 (2002 Census); 53,418 (1989 Soviet census). The population of Cherepanovo accounts for 41.4% of the district's total population.
