= Novosergiyevsky District =

Novosergiyevsky District Новосергиевский район (Russian)
- District
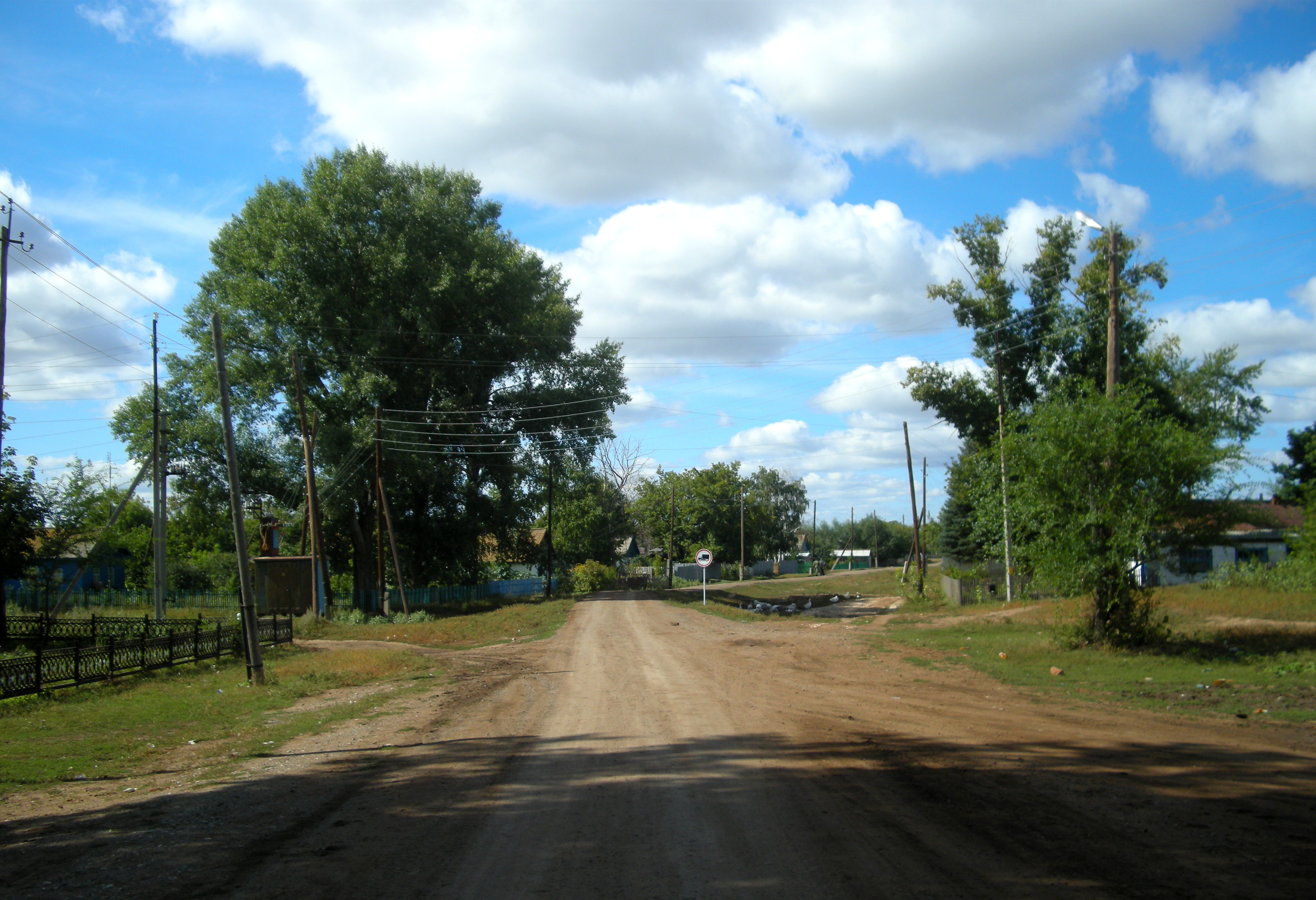
- Sudbodorovka, Novosergiyevsky District

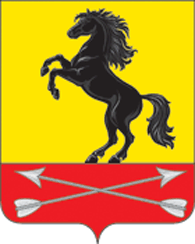
- Coat of arms
- Location of Novosergiyevsky District in Orenburg Oblast
- Coordinates: 52°05′23″N 53°38′38″E
- Country: Russia
- Federal subject: Orenburg Oblast
- Administrative center: Novosergiyevka

Area
  - Total: 4,500 km^{2} (1,700 sq mi)

Population (2010 Census)
  - Total: 36,322
  - Density: 8.1/km^{2} (21/sq mi)
  - Urban: 0%
  - Rural: 100%

Administrative structure
  - Administrative divisions: 18 Selsoviets, 1 Settlement councils
  - Inhabited localities: 69 rural localities

Municipal structure
  - Municipally incorporated as: Novosergiyevsky Municipal District
  - Municipal divisions: 0 urban settlements, 19 rural settlements
- Time zone: UTC+5 (MSK+2)
- OKTMO ID: 53631000
- Website: https://mo-ns.orb.ru/

Novosergiyevsky District (Russian: Новосергиевский райо́н) is an administrative and municipal district (raion), one of the thirty-five in Orenburg Oblast, Russia. It is located in the center of the oblast. The area of the district is 4,500 square kilometers (1,700 sq mi). Its administrative center is the rural locality (a settlement) of Novosergiyevka. Its population, 36,322 as of the (2010 Census), accounts for 37.8% of the district's total population.

== Demographics ==
Population: 36,322 (2010 Census); 37,837 (2002 census); 37,804 (1989 Soviet census).

As of the 2010 Census, the ethnic composition of the population was as follows:

- Russians: 77.0%
- Bashkirs: 6.8%
- Tatars: 5.7%
- other ethnicities: 10.5%
