= List of rural localities in Novosibirsk Oblast =

Map of Russia with Novosibirsk Oblast highlighted

This is a list of rural localities in the Novosibirsk Oblast. Novosibirsk Oblast (Russian: Новосиби́рская о́бласть, Novosibirskaya oblast) is a federal subject of Russia (an oblast) located in southwestern Siberia. Its administrative and economic center is the city of Novosibirsk. The population was 2,665,911 as of the 2010 Census.

== Locations ==
- 8 Marta
- Abakumovo
- Abramovo
- Abrashino
- Alexandro-Nevsky
- Andreyevka
- Baryshevo
- Baykal
- Biaza
- Dovolnoye
- Fedosikha
- Goluboy Zaliv
- Gusiny Brod
- III Internatsional
- Kochki
- Kruglikovo
- Kyshtovka
- Laptevka
- Lokti
- Michurinsky
- Novolugovoye
- Orlovka
- Severnoye
- Ubinskoye
- Ust-Tarka
- Vengerovo
- Verkh-Tula
- Verkh-Irmen
- Verkh-Uryum
- Zdvinsk

== See also ==
- Lists of rural localities in Russia
