= Novolugovoye, Novosibirsk Oblast =

Novolugovoye Новолуговое
- Settlement
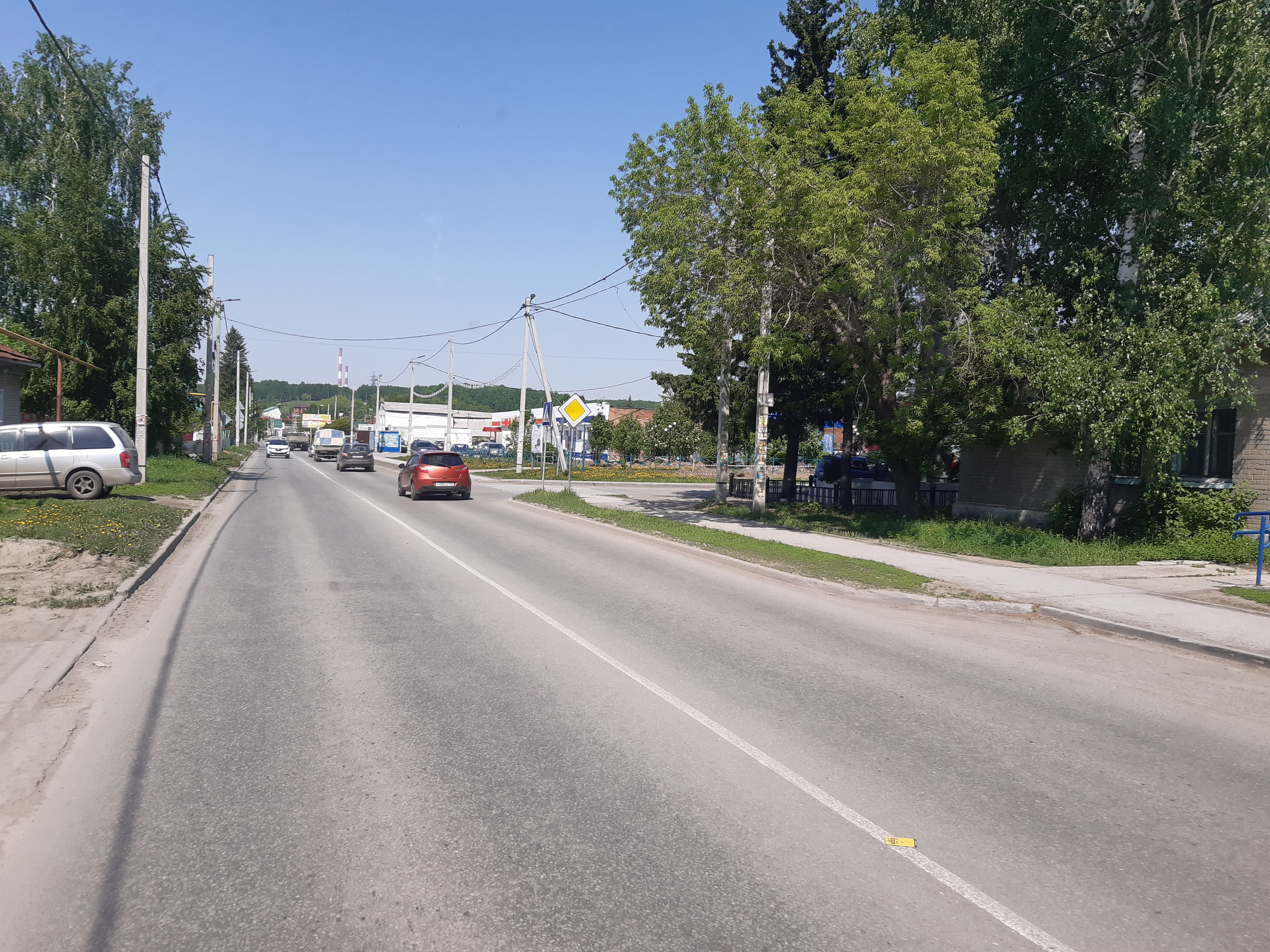
- Andreyev Street

- Location within Novosibirsk Oblast Location within Russia
- Coordinates: 54°58′41″N 83°06′45″E
- Country: Russia
- Region: Novosibirsk Oblast
- District: Novosibirsky District

Novolugovoye (Russian: Новолуговое) is a settlement (a selo) in Novosibirsky District of Novosibirsk Oblast, Russia. The administrative center of Novolugovskoy Selsoviet. It is bordered by Pervomaysky District of Novosibirsk.

== Geography ==
Inya River is a natural border between the settlement and Pervomaysky District of Novosibirsk.

Pereborka River also flows through the settlement, which flows into the Inya.

== Economy ==
- Kalina-Inya is a ceramic manufacturer.

== Transport ==
=== Public transport ===
Marshrutka No. 301 passes through the settlement, this route connects Novolugovoye with Tsentralny, Oktyabrsky and Pervomaysky districts of Novosibirsk, as well as with nearby settlements.

The bus route No. 117 connects Novolugovoye with Pervomaysky District of Novosibirsk, Baryshevo, Izdrevaya and other settlements.

=== Bridges ===
An automobile bridge across the Inya, built in the 1960s, connects the settlement with Pervomaysky District of Novosibirsk. Its length is 173 meters, width is 10.5 meters.
