= Ordynsky =

Ordynsky (masculine), Ordynskaya (feminine), or Ordynskoye (neuter) may refer to:

- Ordynsky District, a district of Novosibirsk Oblast, Russia
- Ordynsky (inhabited locality) (Ordynskaya, Ordynskoye), several inhabited localities in Russia
