= Abrashino =

Abrashino Абрашино
- Village
- Location within Novosibirsk Oblast Location within Russia
- Coordinates: 54°14′N 81°42′E
- Country: Russia
- Region: Novosibirsk Oblast
- District: Ordynsky District
- Time zone: UTC+7:00

Abrashino (Russian: Абрашино) is a rural locality (a village) in Nizhnekamensky Selsoviet of Ordynsky District, Novosibirsk Oblast, Russia. The population was 37 as of 2010. There are 6 streets.

== Geography ==
Abrashino is located 57 km southwest of Ordynskoye (the district's administrative centre) by road. Ust-Khmelyovka is the nearest rural locality.
