= Yeltsovka (Ob) =

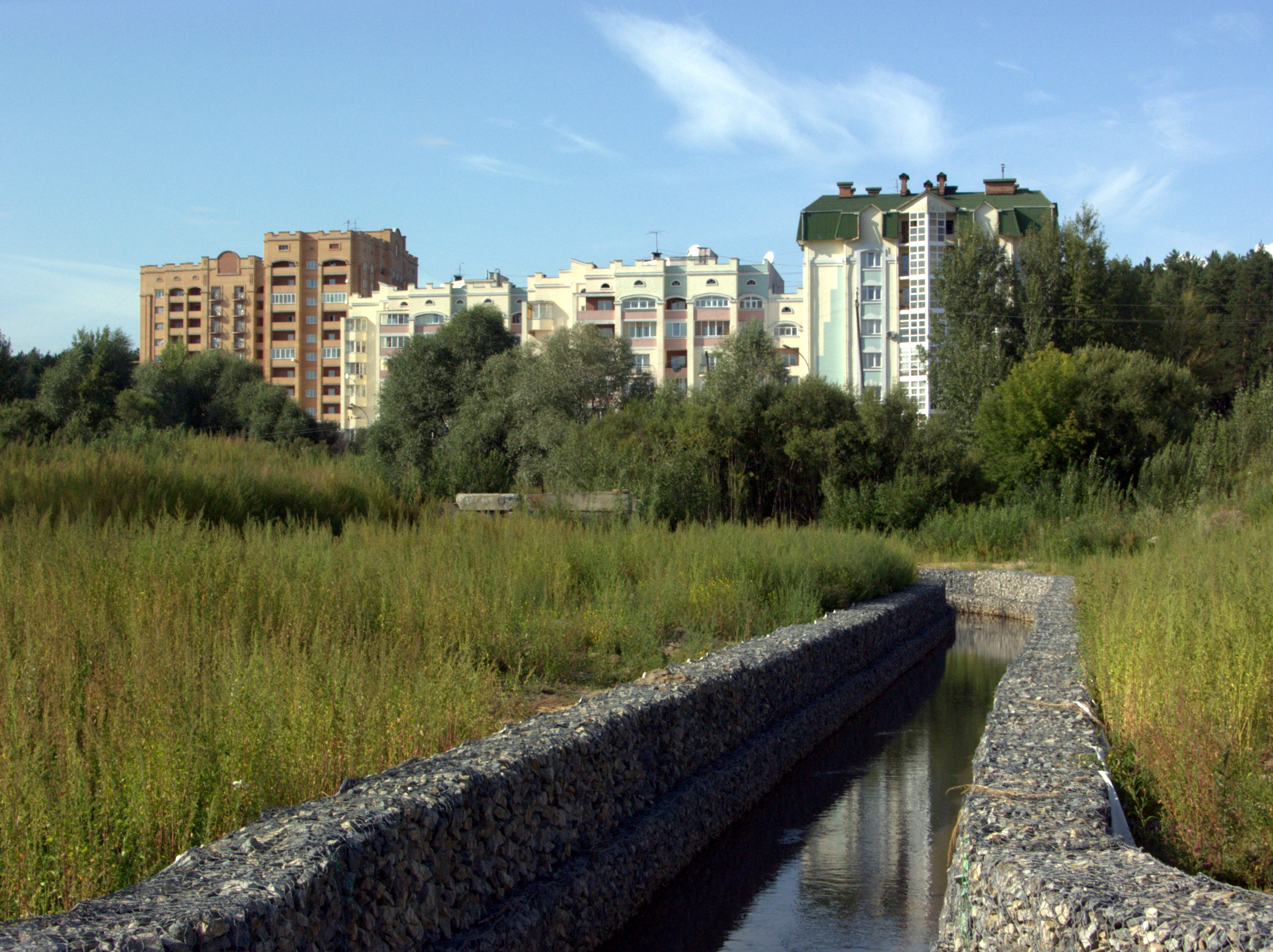
- Nizhnyaya Yeltsovka Microdistrict, Novosibirsk.
- Native name: Ельцовка (Russian)

Location
- Country: Russia
- Region: Novosibirsk Oblast

Physical characteristics
- Mouth: Ob
  - coordinates: 54.8818°N 83.0357°E
- Length: 14 km (8.7 mi)

Basin features
- Progression: Ob→ Kara Sea

The Yeltsovka is a small river in Novosibirsk Oblast, Russia. Its length is 14 km (9 mi). It is a right tributary of the Ob, south of the city of Novosibirsk. The tributaries are the Romikha, Kamyshevka and Dol rivers.

== Gallery ==
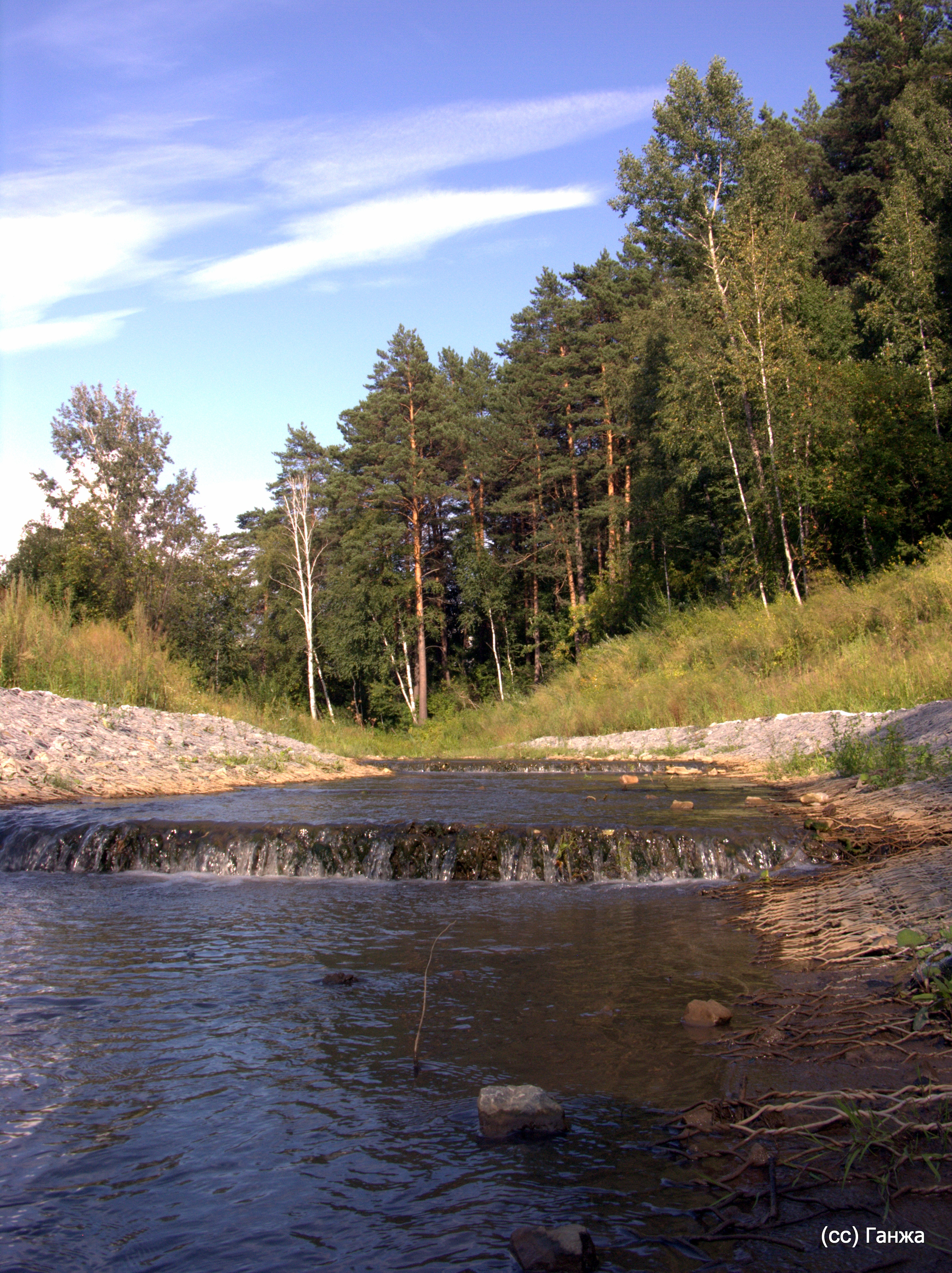

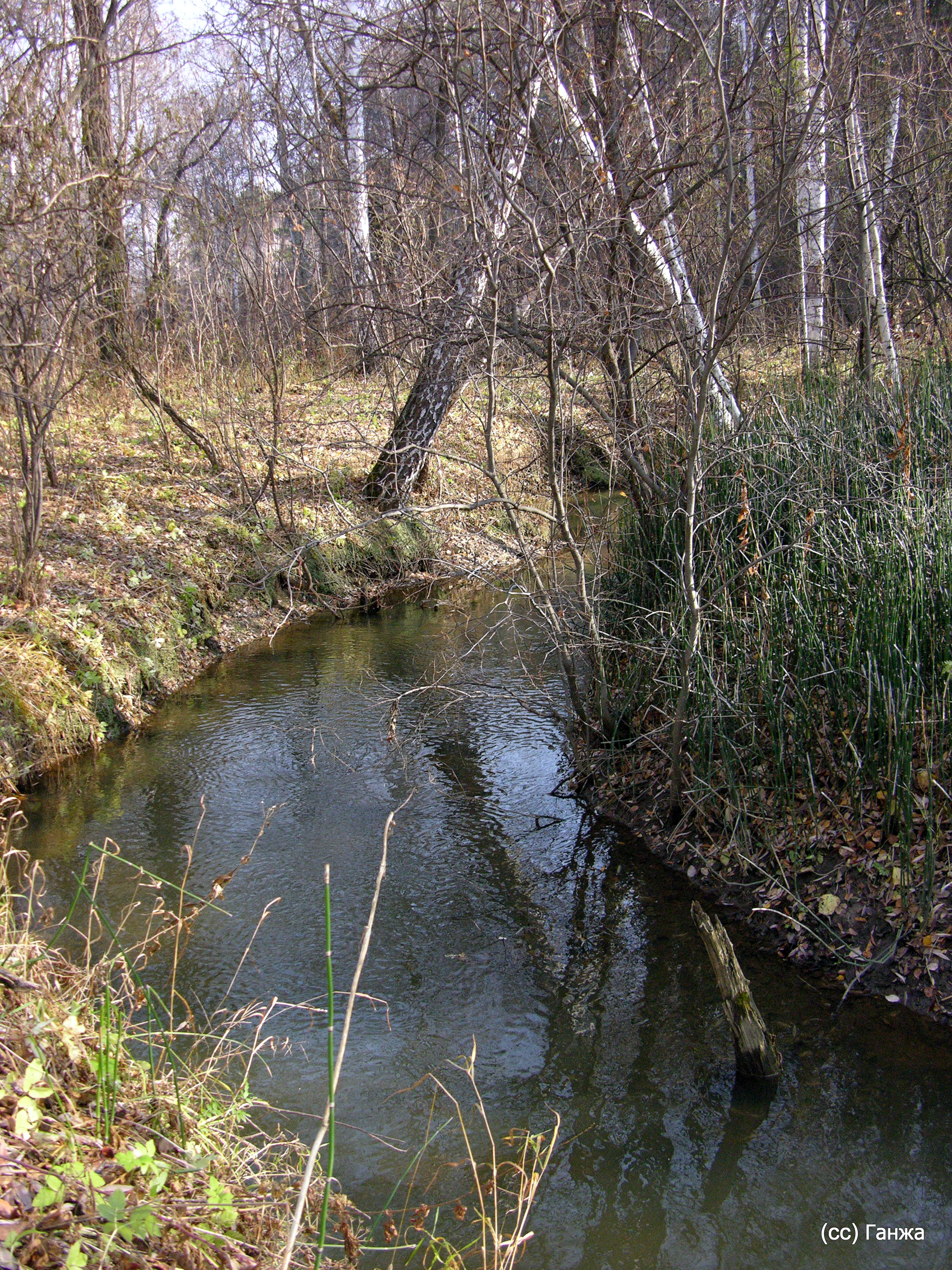

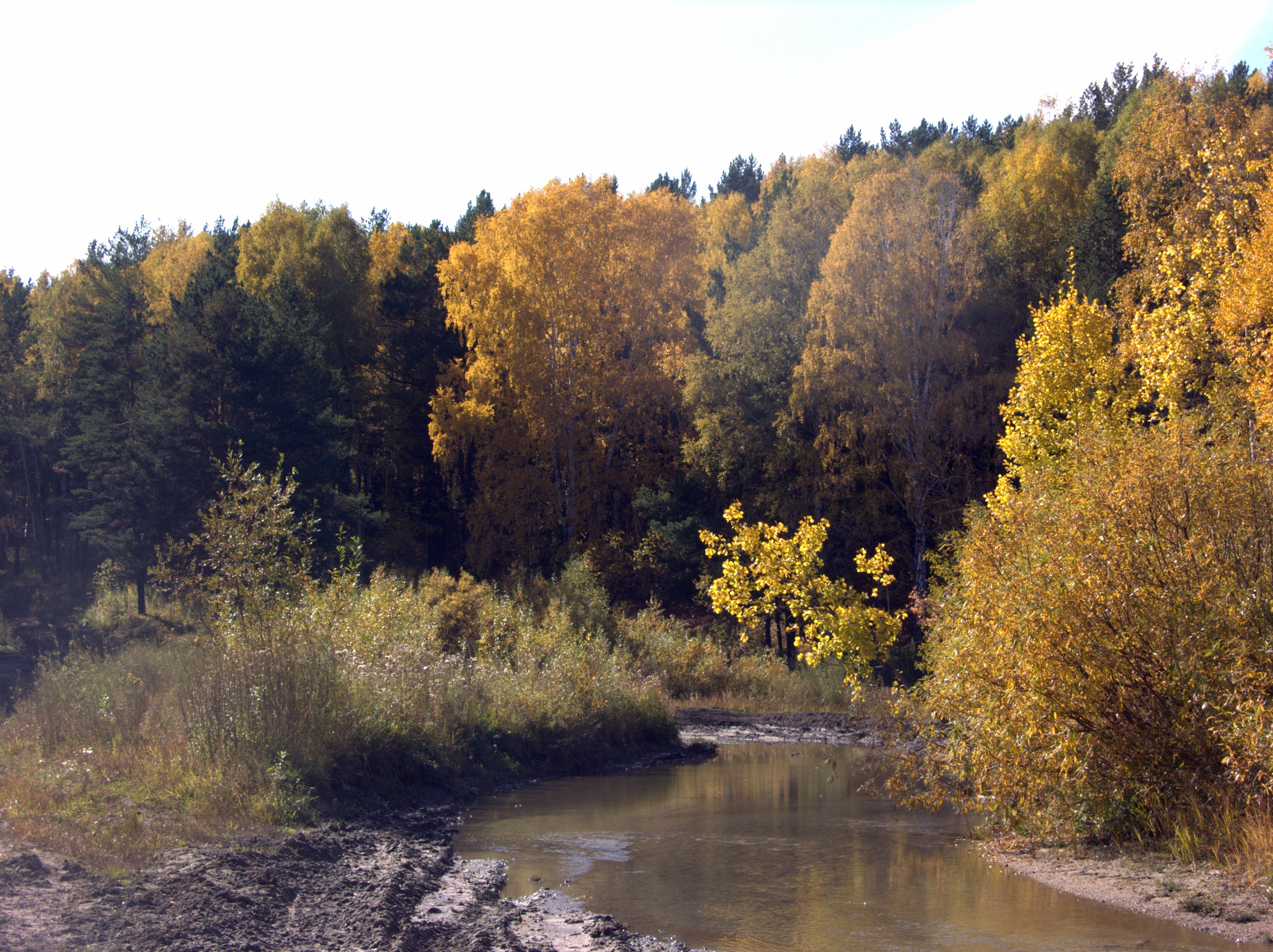

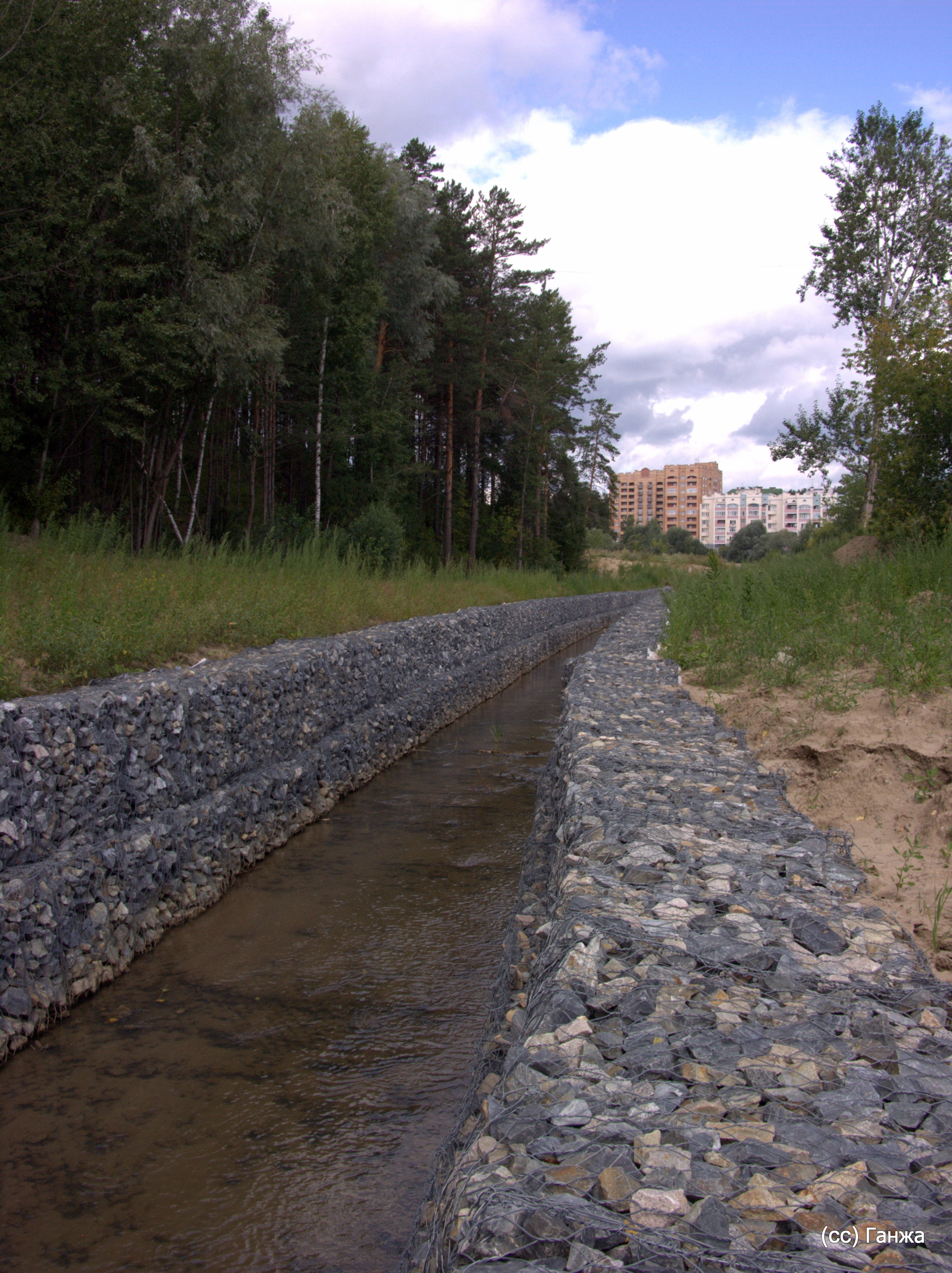

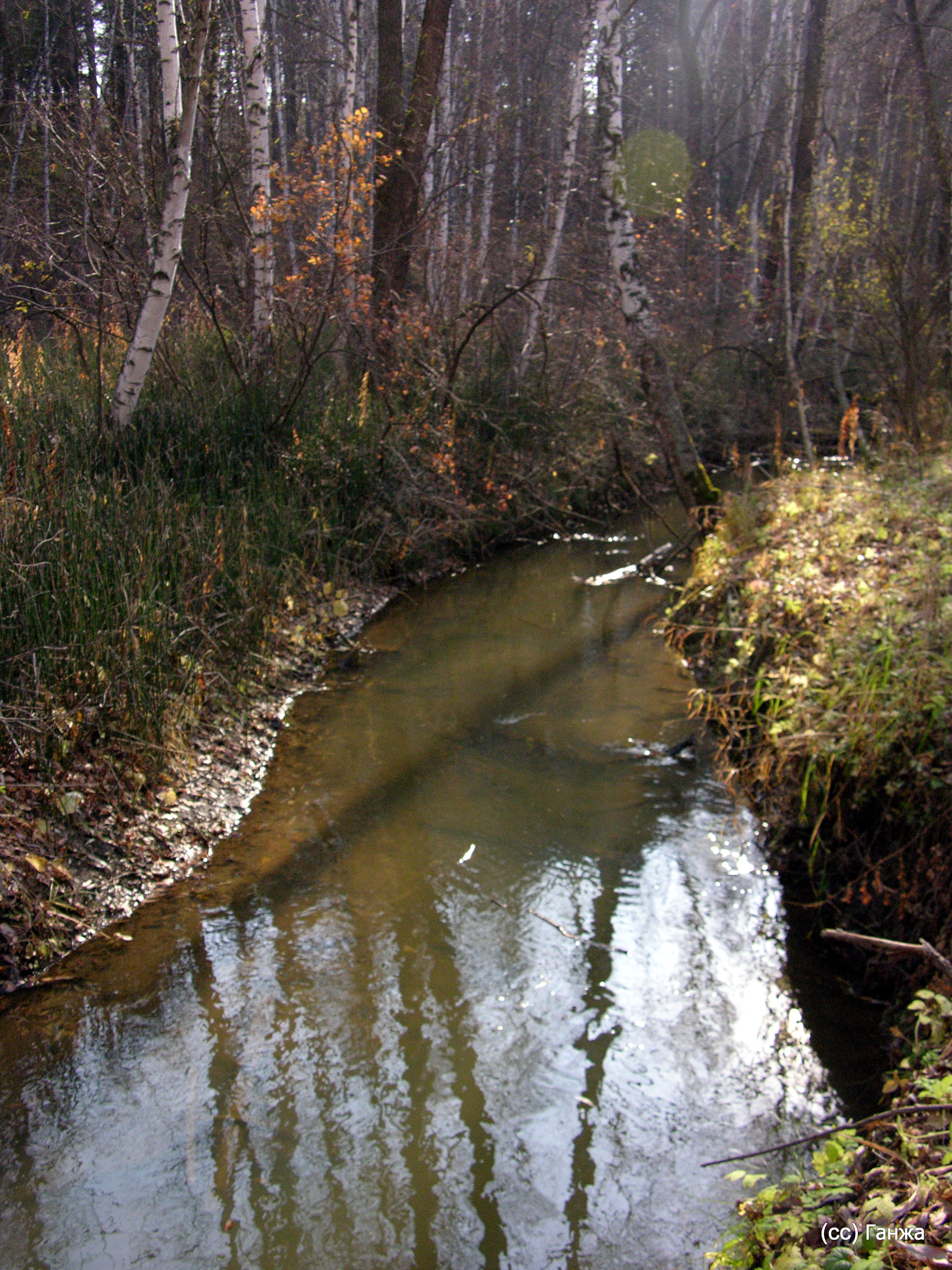

== See also ==
- Izdrevaya River
