= Nordmoll =

Nardmoll
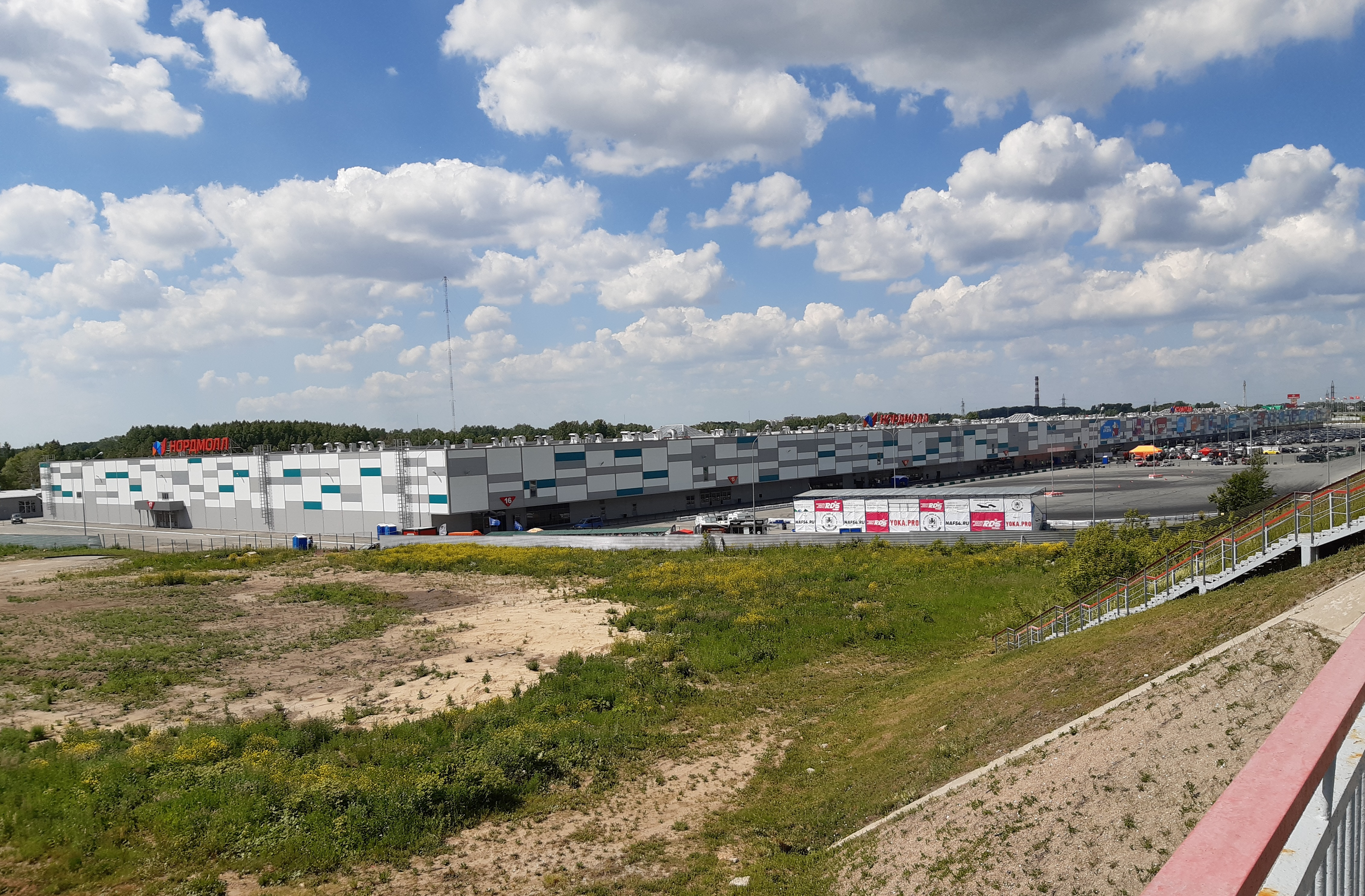
- Location: Novosibirsky District, Novosibirsk Oblast, Russia
- Opened: 2016
- Parking: 3300 spaces
- Website: www.ncmall.ru

Nordmoll is a wholesale and retail center located in the northern suburbs of Novosibirsk at the intersection of the Northern Bypass and the Pashinskoye Highway. Its area is 200,000 square meters. The largest shopping complex in Siberia.

== History ==
The construction of the shopping center began in 2014. In 2016, the first and second stages of the center were commissioned, with a total area of 112,000 m^{2}; the third sector was opened in 2017. The Investments in the project amounted to 5 billion rubles.

In 2015, the Gusinobrodsky Market was closed in Novosibirsk, as a result, some of its traders organized business in new retail centers built near the former market, while other entrepreneurs began to work in the Nordmoll.

According to a 2019 Kommersant article, the asset of the centre is owned by the Nord City Moll LLC, which has been owned since 2019 by the Cyprus company Vochna holdings Co. limited (previously the Nord City Moll LLC was owned by the Ortalion Commercial Ltd. from Cyprus).

As of April 2022, only one corps of the retail center was in operation, and even in this corps there were many empty pavilions.

== Financial statistics ==
Financial statistics of the center for 2017:

- Revenue – 112.2 million rubles
- Net loss – 654.6 million rubles
- Long-term liabilities – 4.9 billion rubles

== Gallery ==
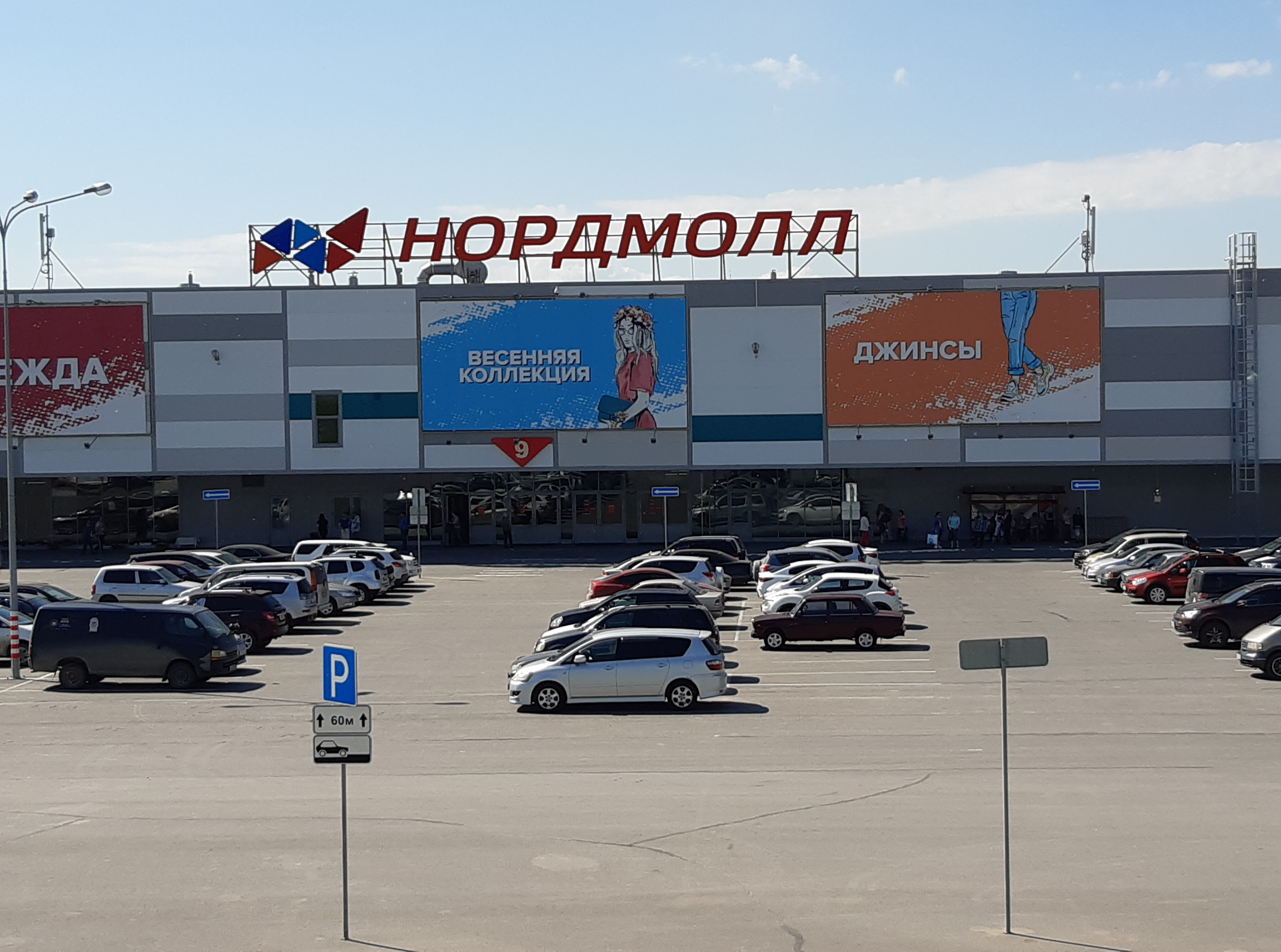

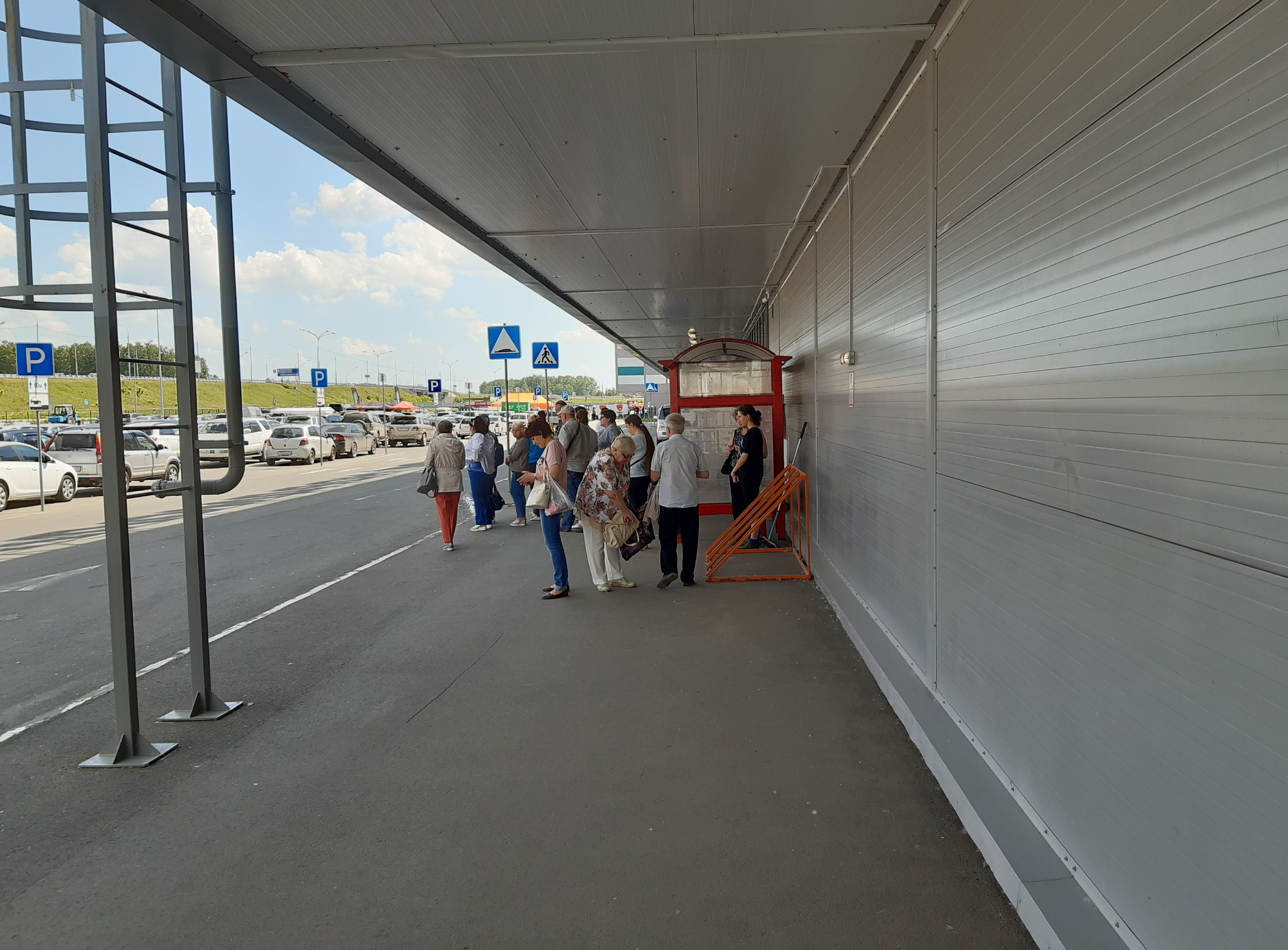

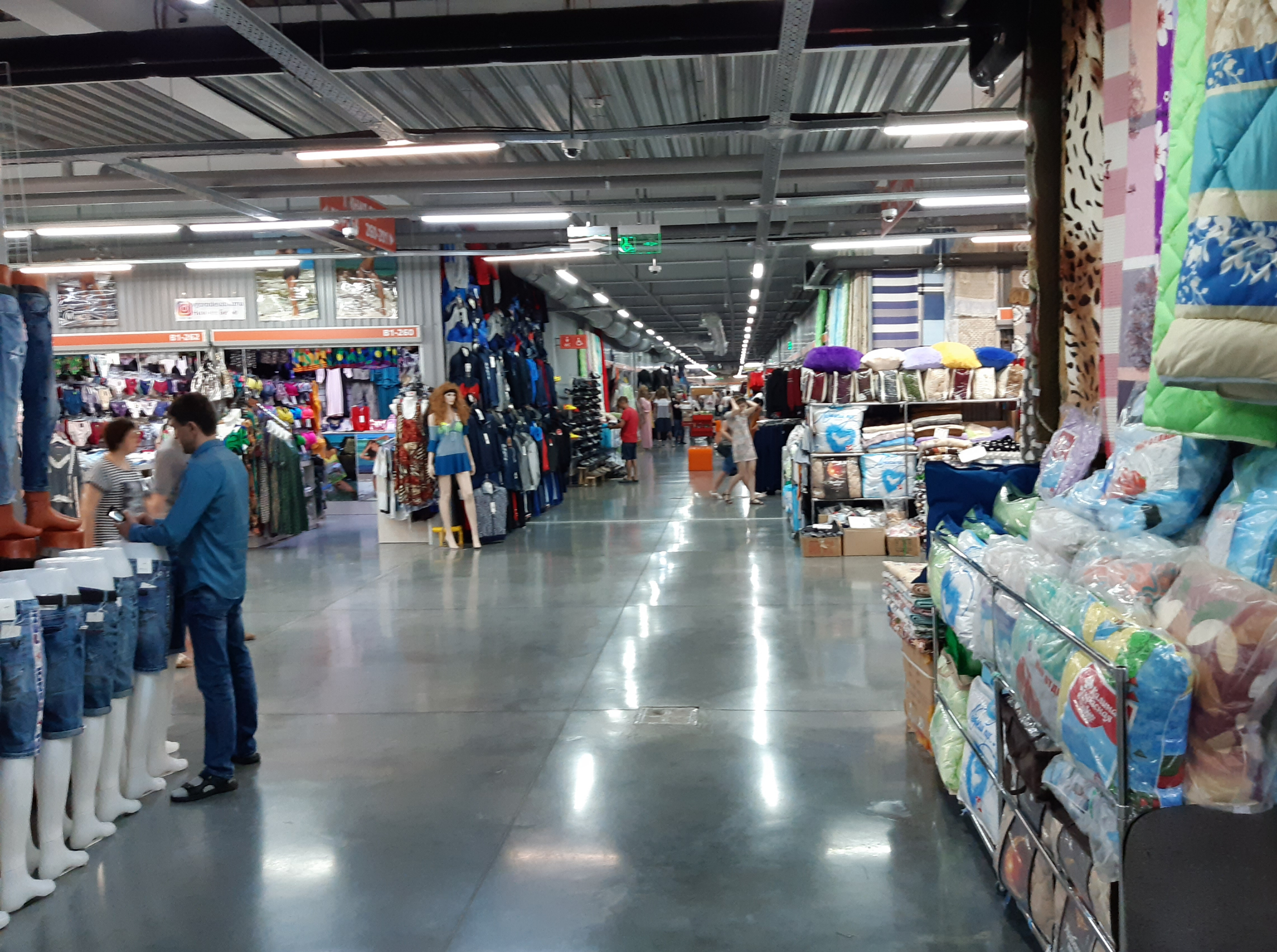

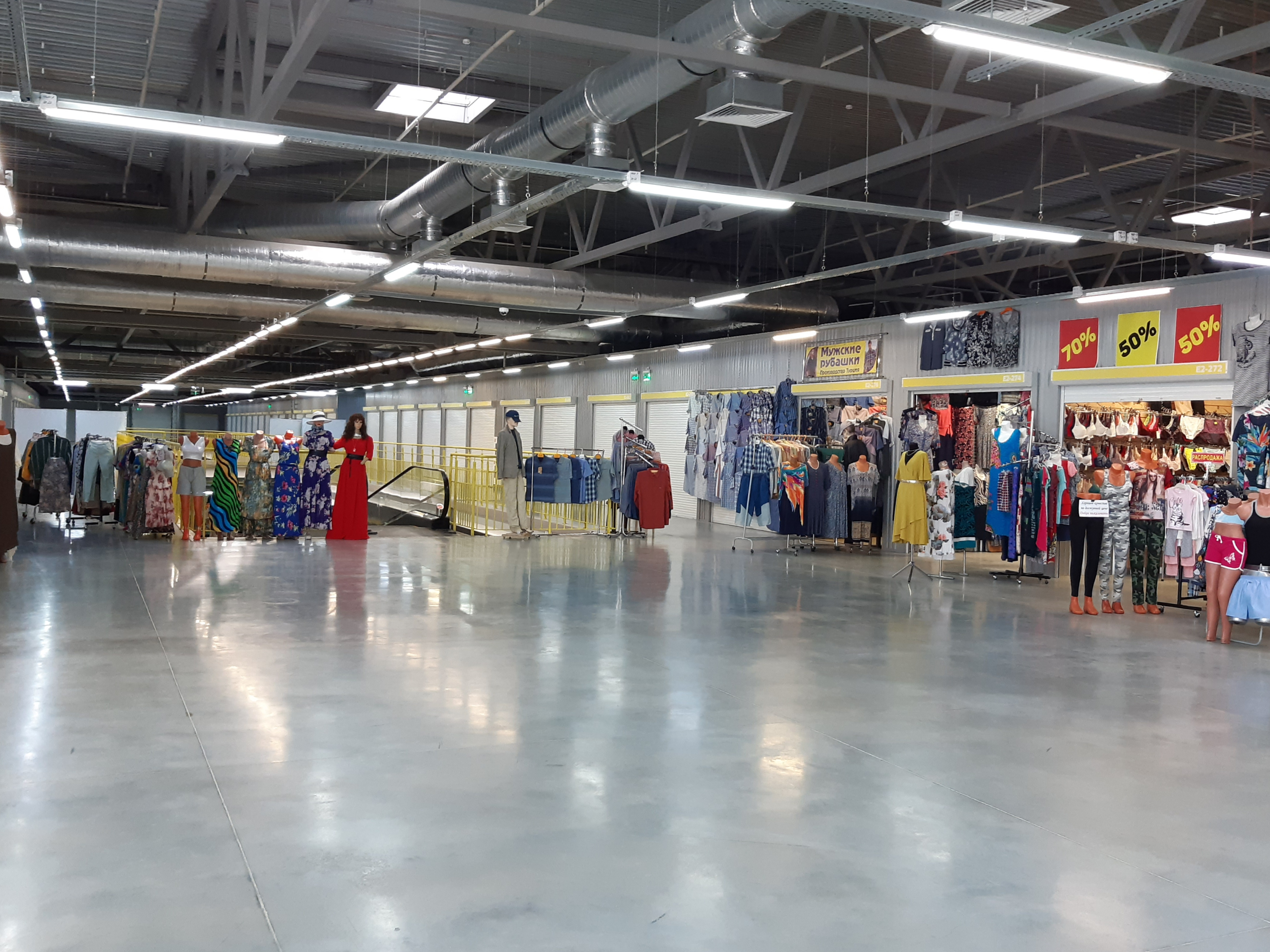
