= Ordynsky (inhabited locality) =

Ordynsky (Russian: Ордынский; masculine), Ordynskaya (Ордынская; feminine), or Ordynskoye (Ордынское; neuter) is the name of several inhabited localities in Russia.

Urban localities

- Ordynskoye, a work settlement in Ordynsky District of Novosibirsk Oblast

Rural localities

- Ordynsky, Irkutsk Oblast, a settlement in Ekhirit-Bulagatsky District of Ust-Orda Buryat Okrug in Irkutsk Oblast
- Ordynsky, Krasnodar Krai, a settlement in Kurchansky Rural Okrug of Temryuksky District in Krasnodar Krai; 45°21′N 37°40′E
