= Izdrevaya =

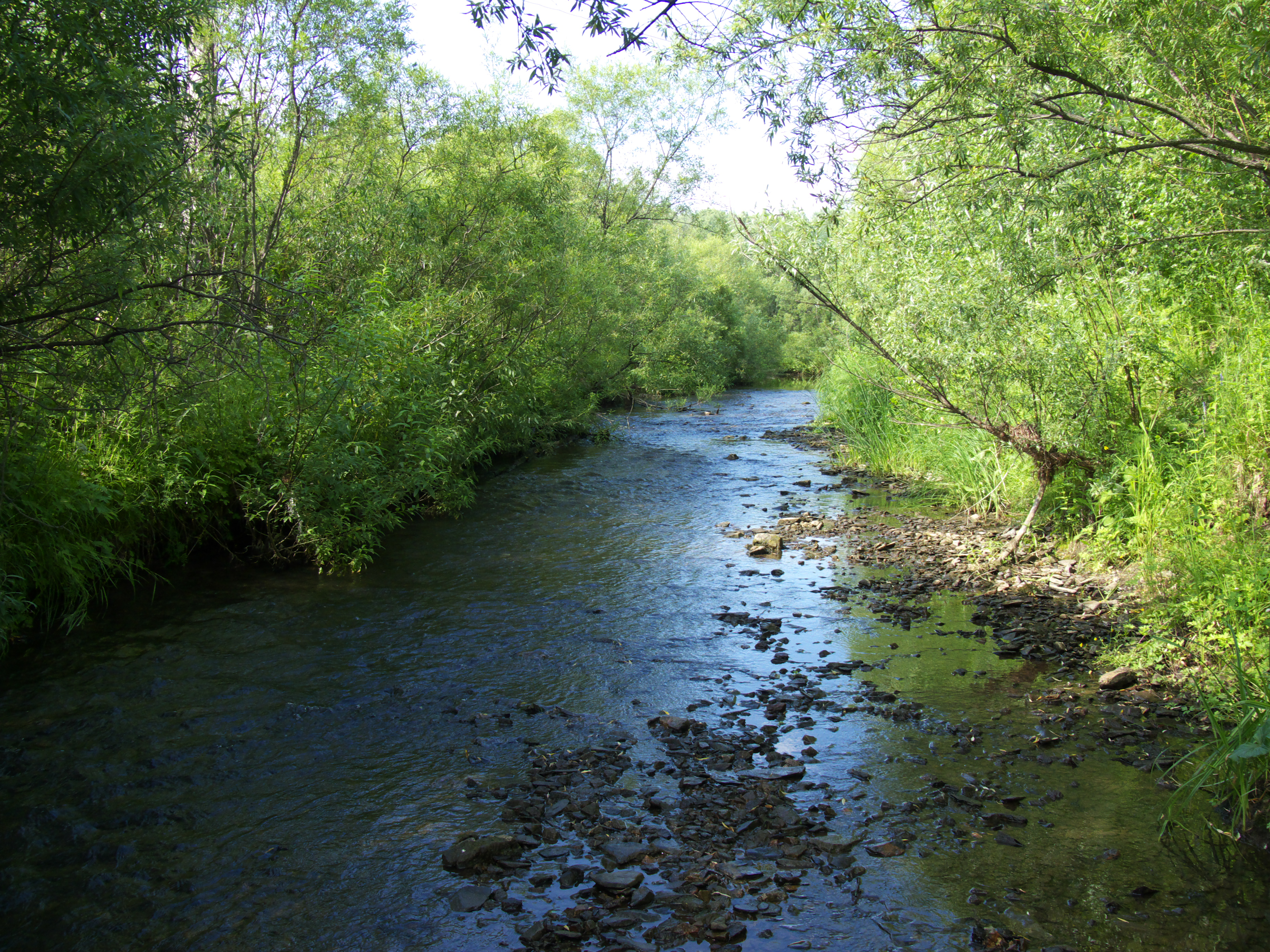
- Native name: Издревая (Russian)

Location
- Country: Russia
- Region: Novosibirsk Oblast

Physical characteristics
- Mouth: Inya
  - coordinates: 54°59′44″N 83°12′59″E
- Length: 27 km (17 mi)

Basin features
- Progression: Inya→ Ob→ Kara Sea

The Izdrevaya (Russian: Издревая) is a small river in Novosibirsk Oblast, Russia. Its length is 27 km (17 mi). The river is a right tributary of the Inya.

The tributaries of the river: Ipotinka, Smorodinka, Mostovka, Tokalikha, Malaya Izdrevaya rivers etc.

By the Izdrevaya lies the settlements of Zherebtsovo, Gusiny Brod and Komarovka.

== Fauna ==
Since 2012, volunteers have been breeding Ural owl in the Izdrevaya basin.

During 2012–2016, 8 species of Falconiformes were identified in the Izdrevaya River Basin (nesting was established for 4 species), 3 species of owls were also identified (nesting was created for two species).

== Gallery ==
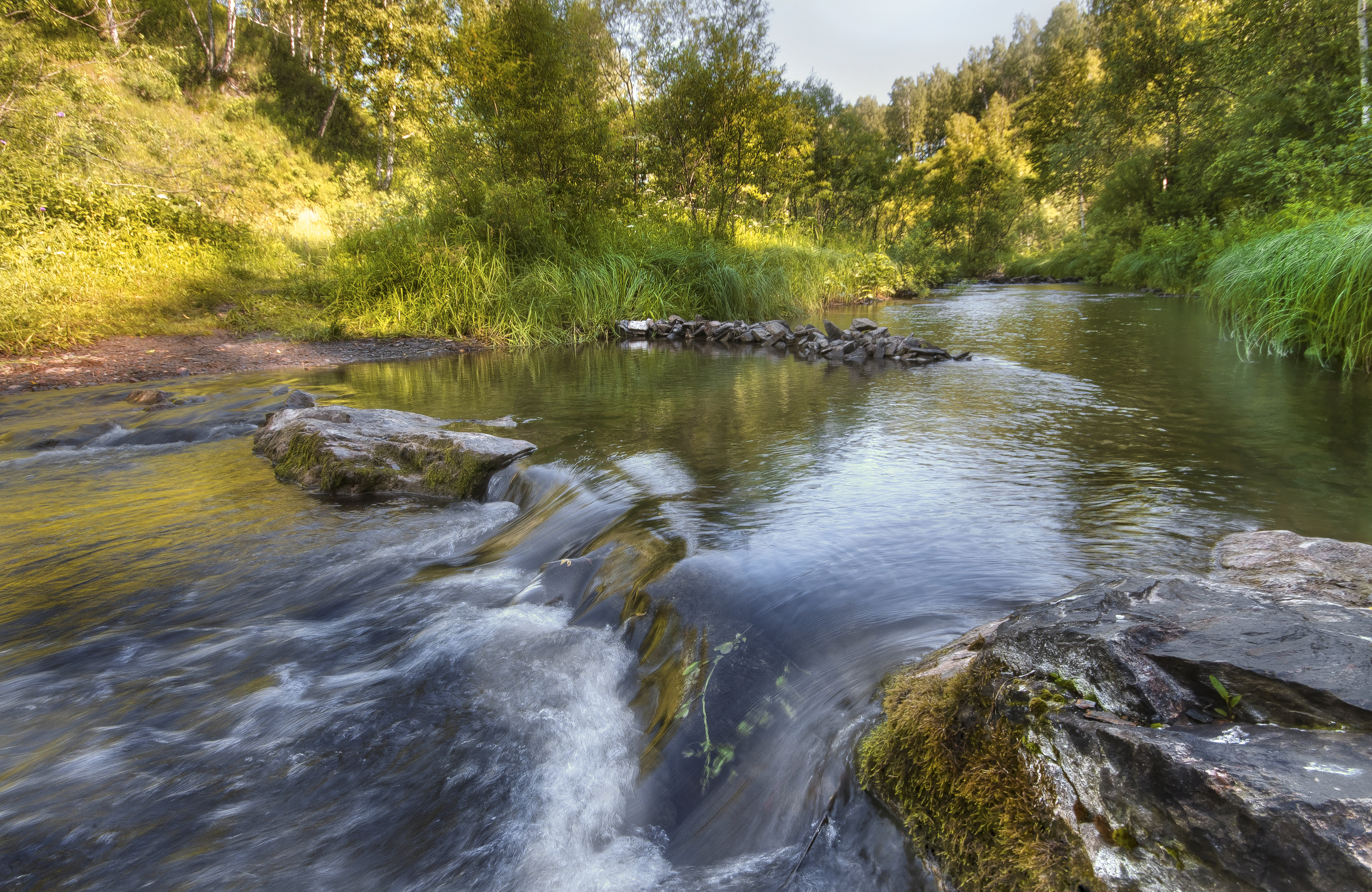
A view of the Izdrevaya River
