= Bugotak =

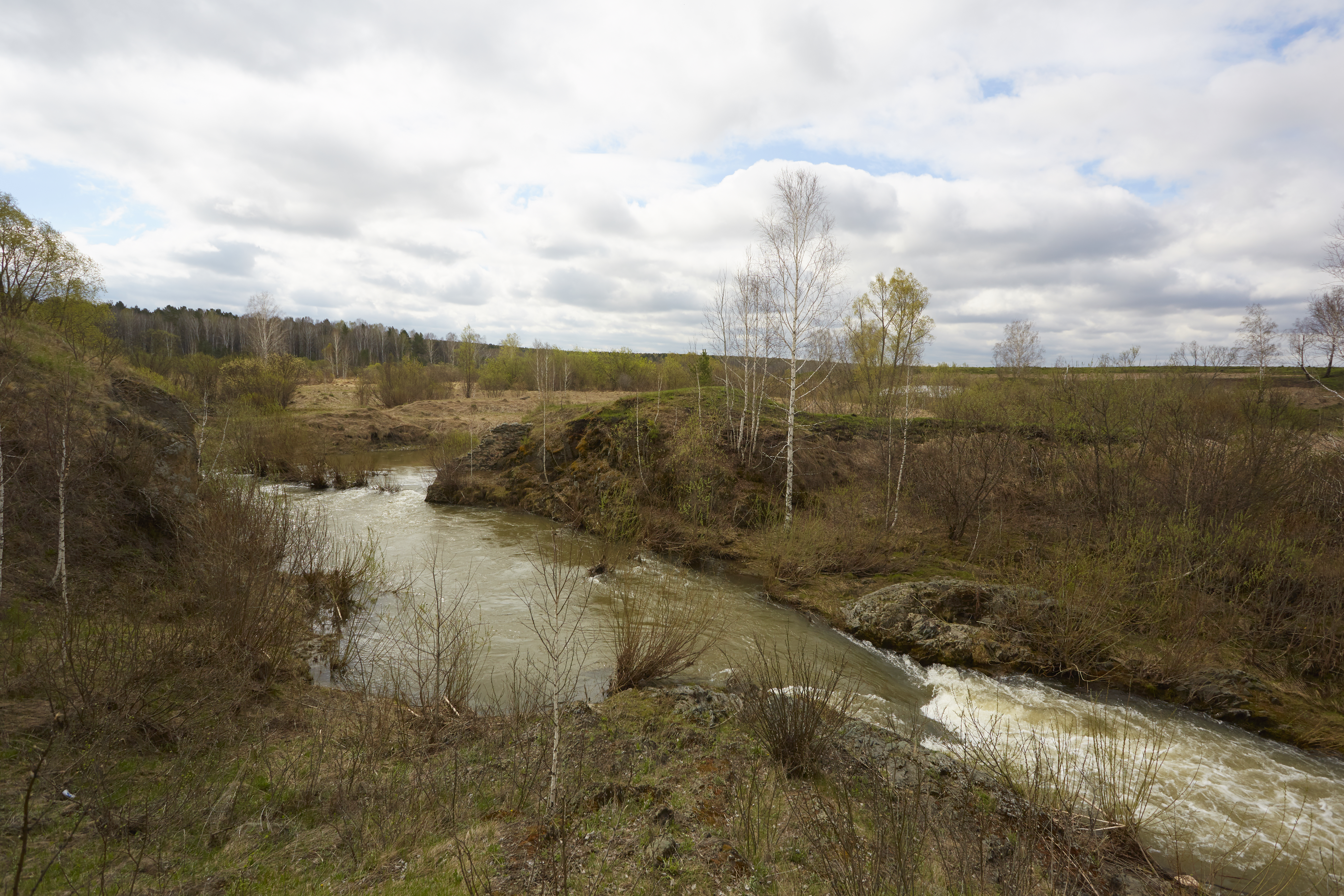
- Native name: Буготак (Russian)

Location
- Country: Russia
- Region: Novosibirsk Oblast

Physical characteristics
- Mouth: Inya
  - coordinates: 55°08′50″N 83°47′23″E
- Length: 40 km (25 mi)

Bugotak is a river in Toguchinsky District of Novosibirsk Oblast. The river flows into the Inya. Its length is 40 km (25 mi).

The tributaries of the river are the Kamenka (27 km), Karpysak (15 km), Kamenka (8 km).

== Gallery ==
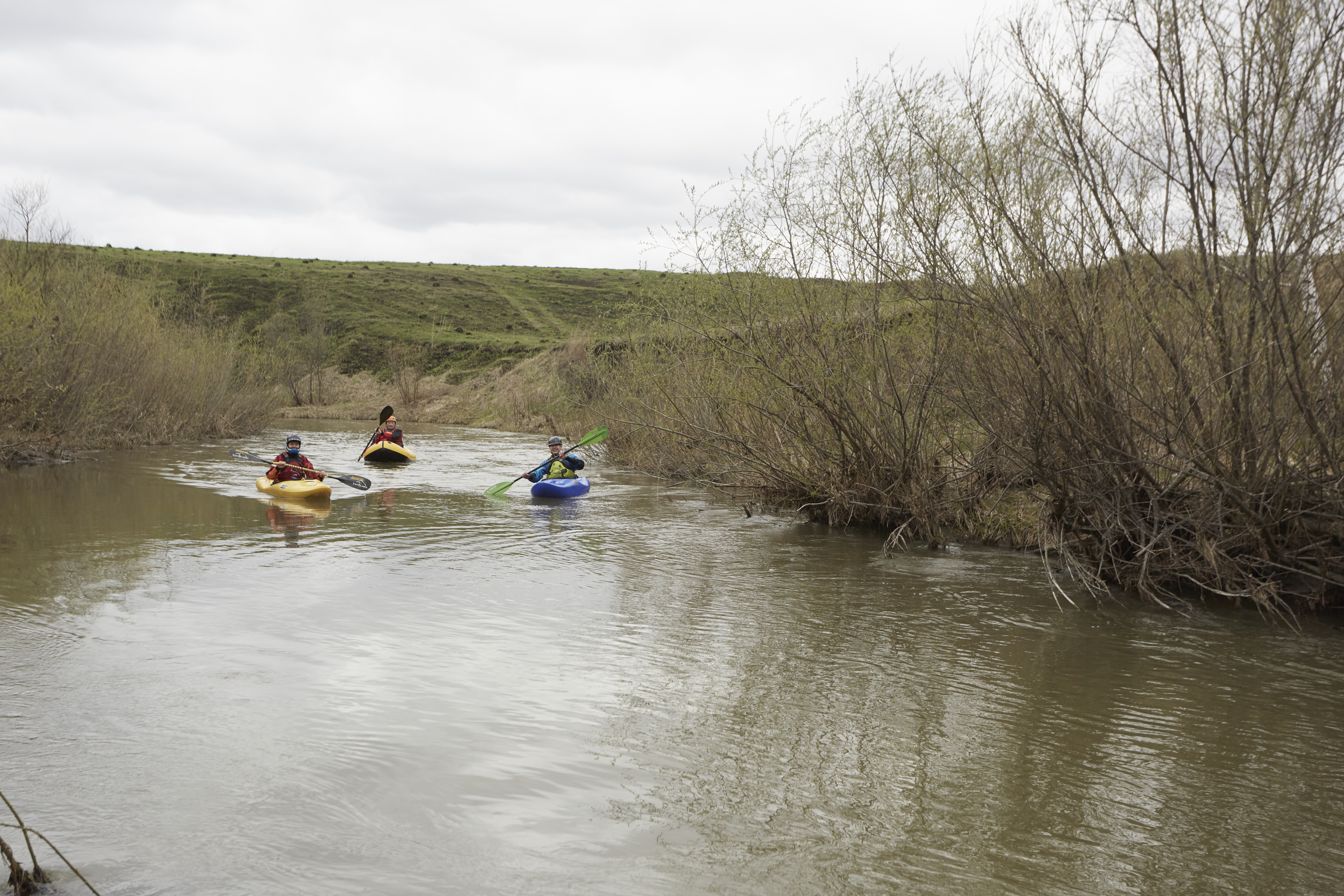

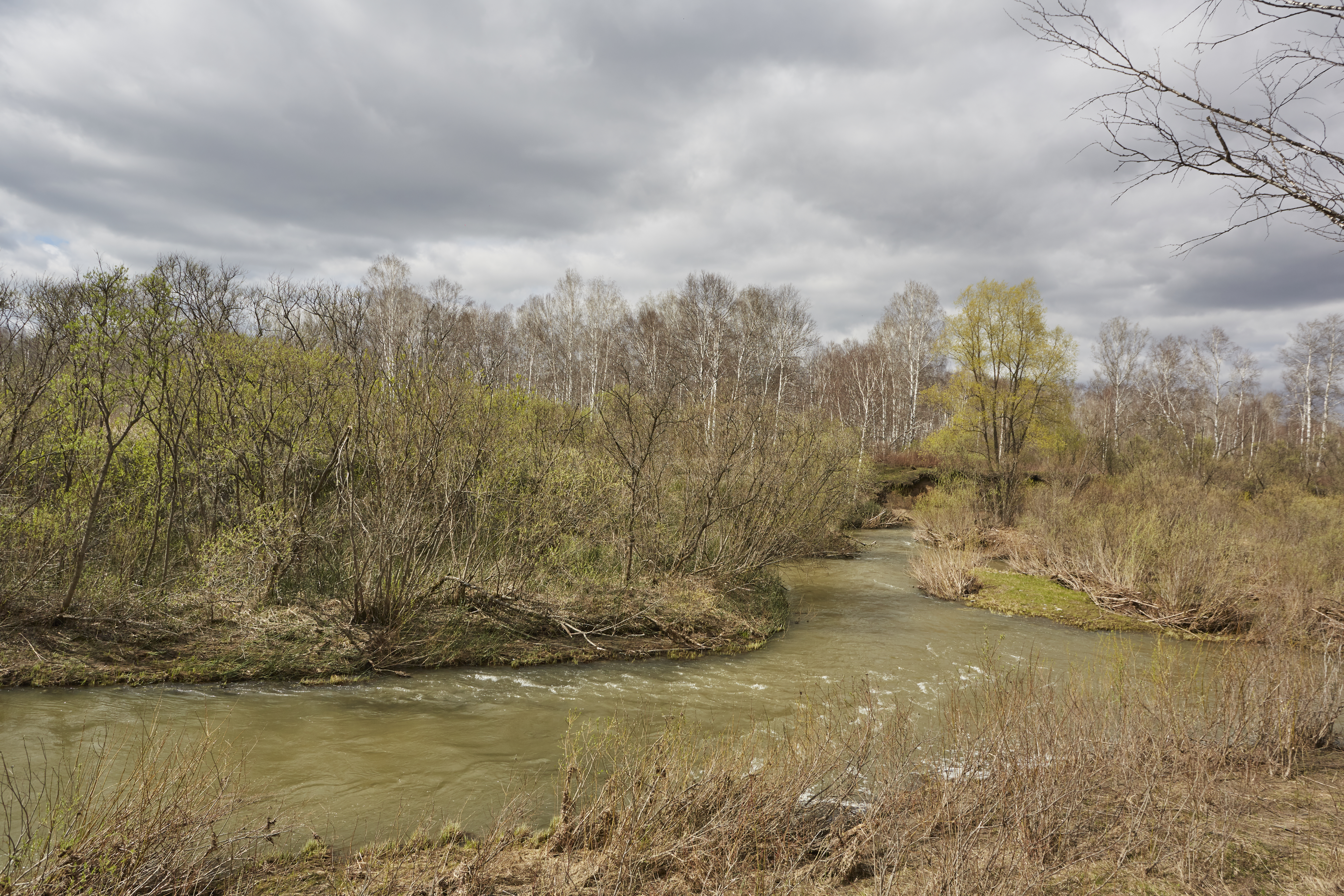

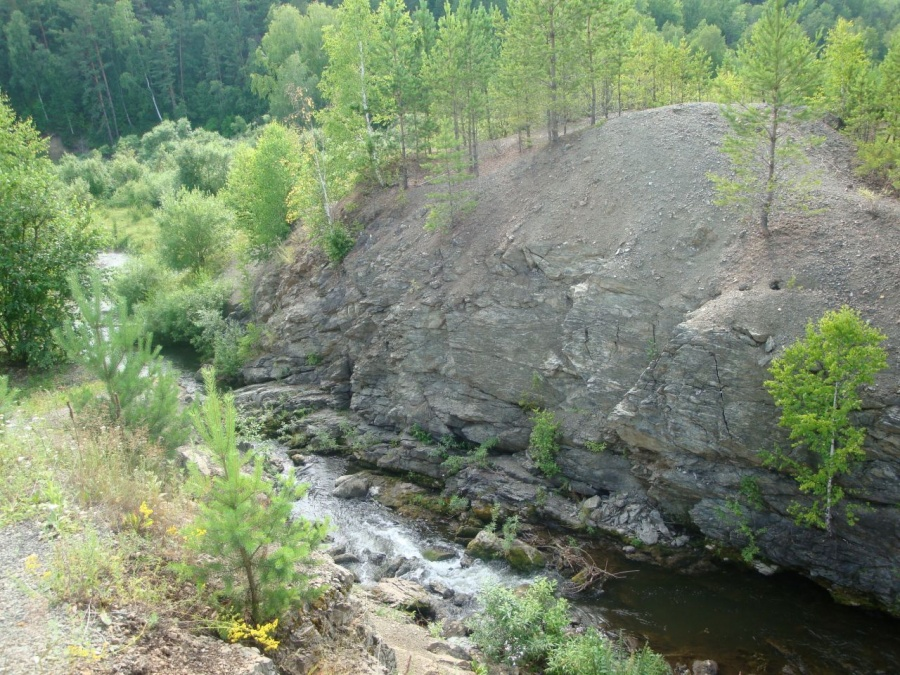

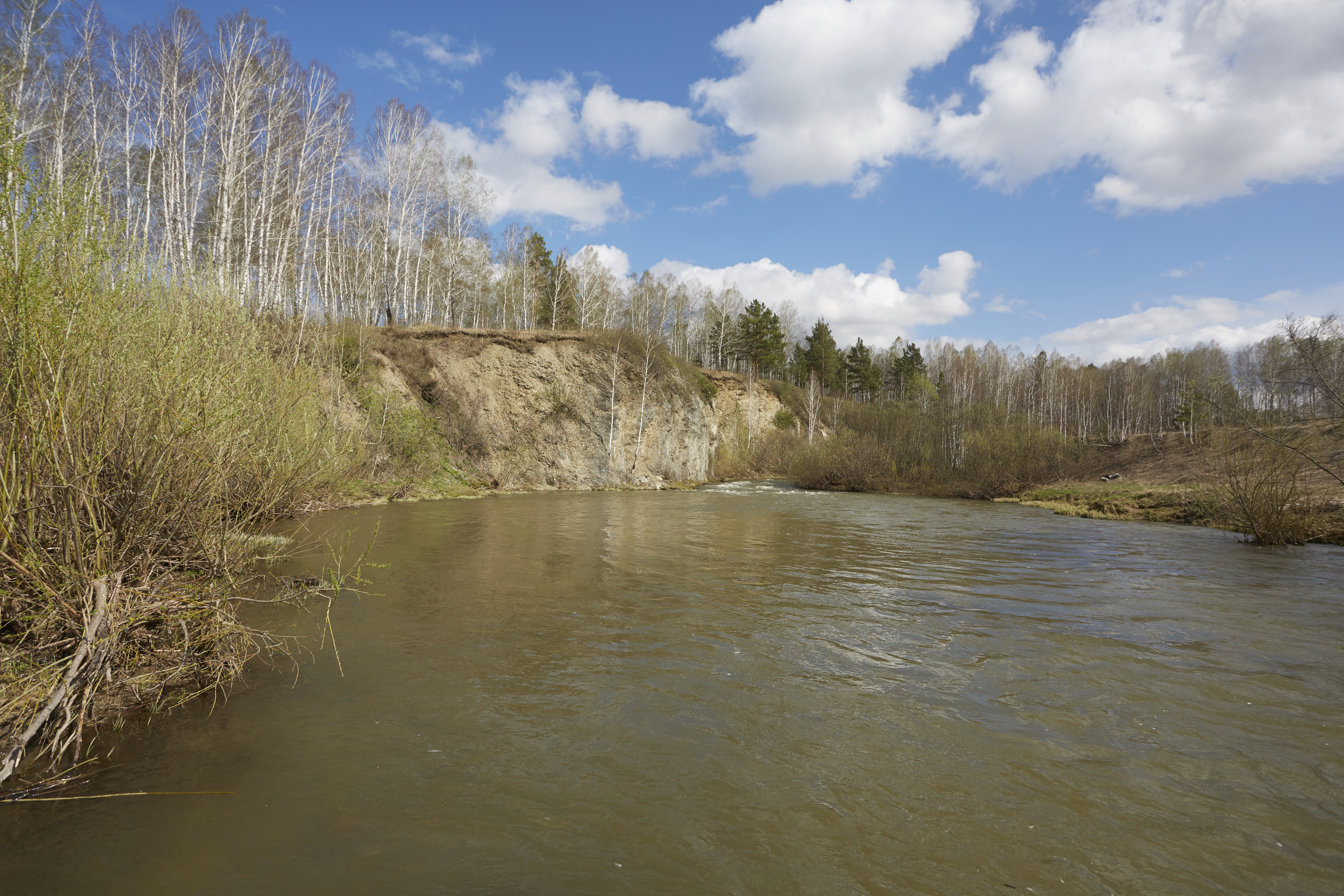
