= Novosibirsky =

Novosibirsky (masculine), Novosibirskaya (feminine), or Novosibirskoye (neuter) may refer to:

- Novosibirsky District, a district of Novosibirsk Oblast, Russia
- Novosibirsky (rural locality), a rural locality (a settlement) in Krasnoyarsk Krai, Russia
- Novosibirsk Oblast (Novosibirskaya oblast), a federal subject of Russia
- Novosibirskoye, a rural locality (a selo) in Sakhalin Oblast, Russia
