= Verkh-Tula =

Verkh-Tula Верх-Тула
- Settlement
- Flag

- Location within Novosibirsk Oblast Location within Russia
- Coordinates: 54°53′00″N 82°46′30″E
- Country: Russia
- Region: Novosibirsk Oblast
- District: Novosibirsky District

Verkh-Tula (Russian: Верх-Тула) is a settlement (a posyolok) and the administrative center of Verkh-Tulinsky Selsoviet in Novosibirsky District of Novosibirsk Oblast, Russia. It was founded in 1654. Population: 6020 (2010 Census).

== History ==
Verkh-Tula was established in 1654.

By 1893, the village comprised 120 homes. It was inhabited by 287 men and 296 women, and it featured a single drinking establishment.

In 1911, the settlement had grown to include 279 homes, with a population of 716 men and 710 women. It boasted a church, a parish school, six trade shops, a beer shop, a wine shop, a grain warehouse, and a butter factory.

== Transport ==
Ordynskoye Highway passes through the settlement, connecting it with Leninsky District of Novosibirsk. Another road runs from Verkh-Tula to Leninskoye. In 2017, this road was reconstructed.
