= Michurinsky, Novosibirsk Oblast =

Michurinsky Мичуринский
- Settlement
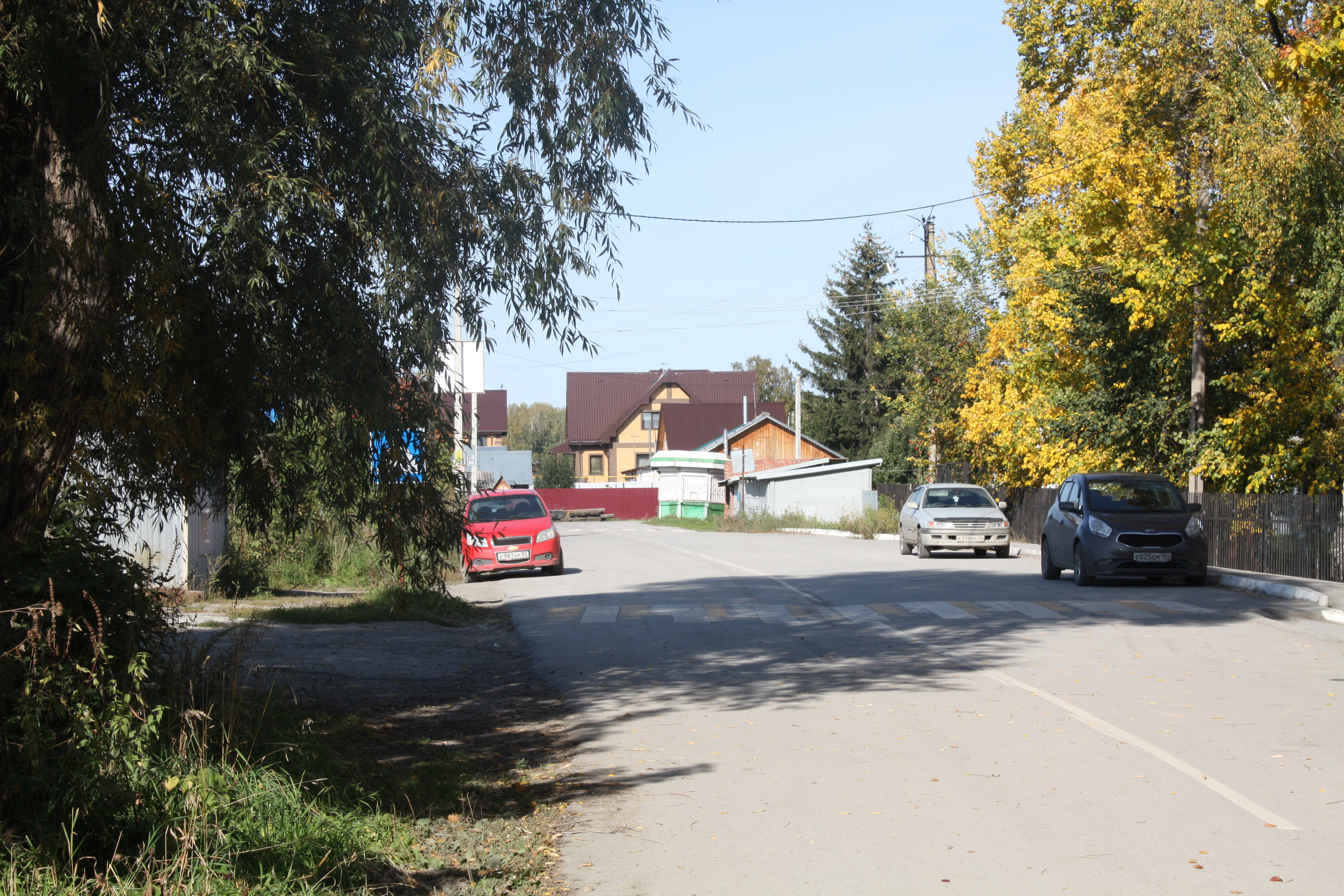

- Location within Novosibirsk Oblast Location within Russia
- Coordinates: 54°52′51″N 83°00′39″E
- Country: Russia
- Region: Novosibirsk Oblast
- District: Novosibirsky District

Michurinsky (Russian: Мичуринский) is a settlement (a posyolok) in Novosibirsky District of Novosibirsk Oblast, Russia. The administrative center of Michurinsky Selsoviet. Population: 1208 (2010 Census). Michurinsky is located between Yuny Leninets and Ogurtsovo (Sovetsky District of Novosibirsk).
