= Marshrutka in Novosibirsk =

Fixed route taxi system in Russia

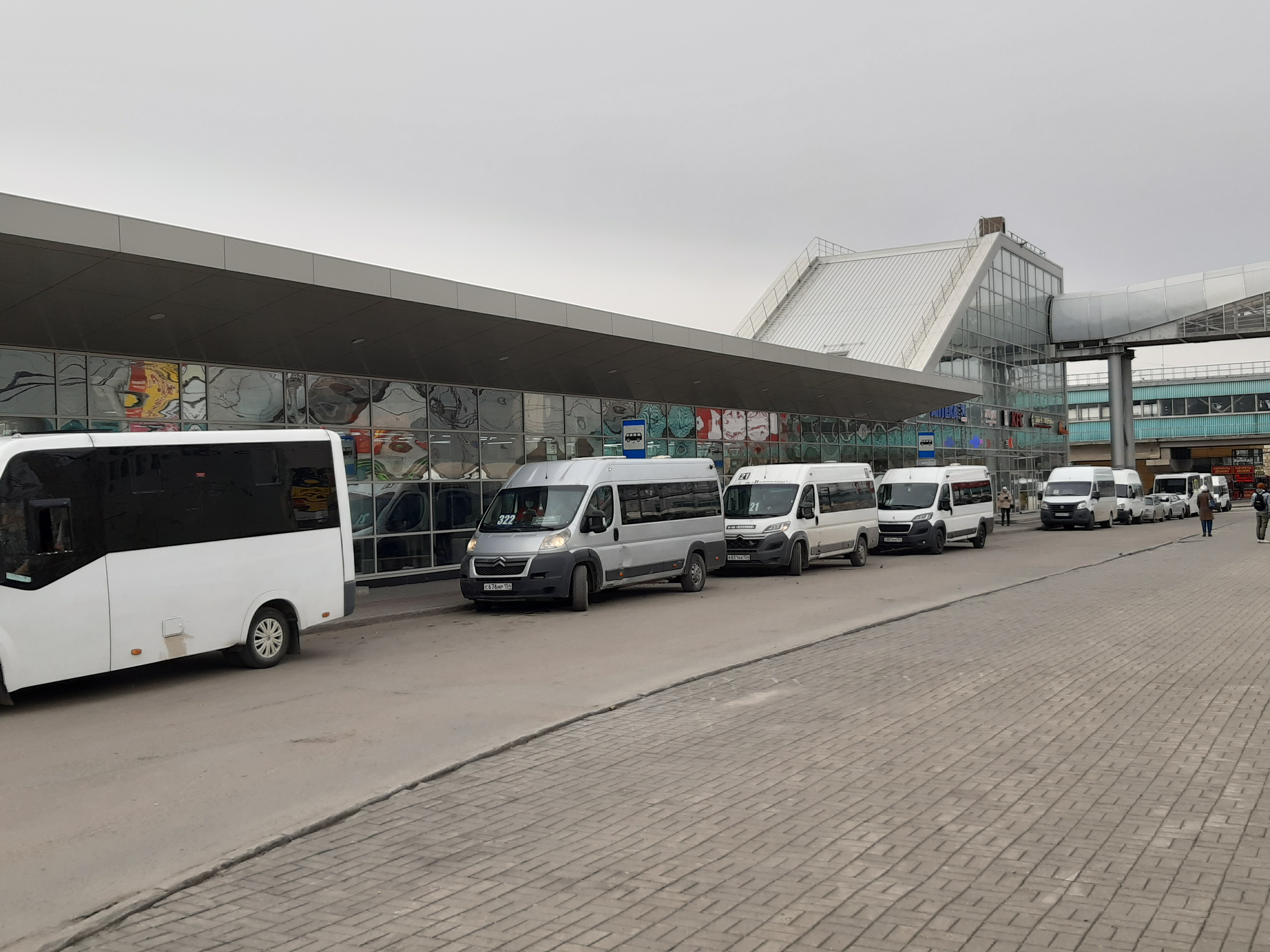
Minibus stop near Rechnoy Vokzal metro station.

Novosibirsk Marshrutka is a fixed route taxi system in Novosibirsk. This type of transport began operating in the city in the 1970s. In the 2010s, the city authorities began to gradually replace minibuses with buses.

== History ==
=== Soviet period ===
In the late 1970s, the first rout taxi minibuses (RAF-2203) appeared in Novosibirsk. During the Soviet period, the marshrutka network consisted of 13 routes which mainly went from metro stations to remote areas of the city. One of the first routes was introduced towards Akademgorodok (Sovetsky District). The minibus ride cost 15 kopecks. It was three times more expensive than tram or trolleybus rides, which cost 5 kopecks.

All fixed-route taxis belonged to the city, namely, the Municipal Enterprise of Road Transportation No. 5 (PATP-5).

In 1989, the first cooperative route taxi appeared in the city.

=== Post-Soviet period ===
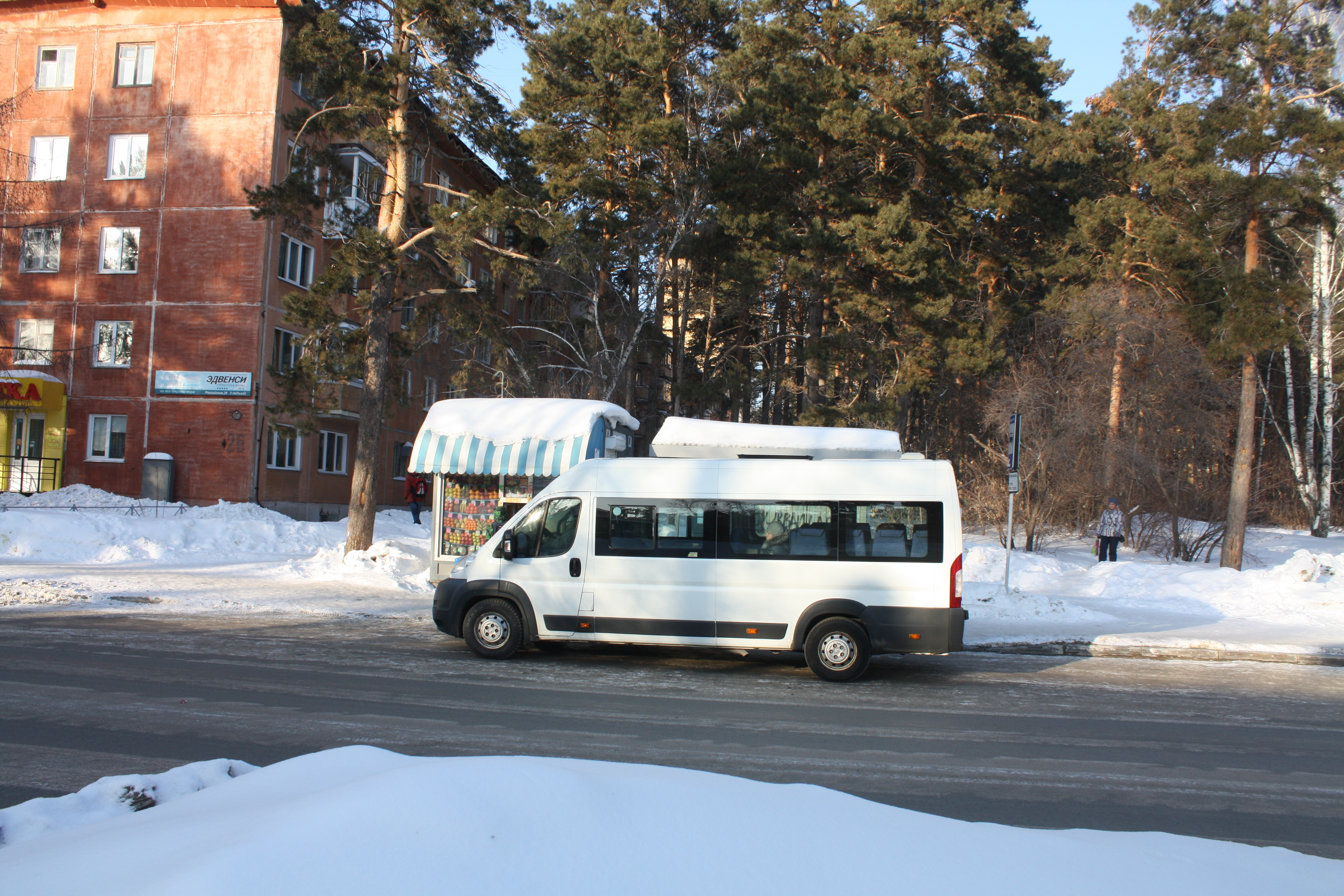
Marshrutka on Rossiyskaya Street, Lower Zone of Akademgorodok.

In the early 1990s, GAZelle minibuses began to replace RAF minibuses. The marshrutka has become more popular than trolleybuses and buses. This type of transport was the second most popular after Novosibirsk Metro.

In the 2000s, in addition to Gazelles, Ford Transit, Iveco Daily, Mercedes-Benz Sprinter, and Peugeot Boxer minibuses also began to work.

In the 2010s, the number of mini buses decreased, route taxi began to be replaced by buses. For example, in 2015, two minibus routes were closed. Also the number of GAZelles and Fords was reduced on 30 routes, route taxi fleet was reduced by 180 vehicles. Instead of these minibuses, 30 buses began to run.

== Current status ==
There are 56 marshrutkas routes in Novosibirsk: №№ 1, 2, 4, 5, 6, 7, 8, 9, 10, 11, 12, 13, 14, 15, 16, 17, 17а, 18, 19, 20, 21, 23, 24, 25, 28, 29, 29а, 30, 32, 33, 34, 35, 42, 43, 44, 44а, 45, 46, 48, 49, 50, 51, 52, 53, 54, 55, 57, 62, 63, 64, 65, 68, 73, 86, 87, 91.
