= 8 Marta, Novosibirsk Oblast =

8 Marta 8 Марта
- Rural locality
- Interactive map of 8 Marta
- Location of 8 Marta 8 Marta (Novosibirsk Oblast)
- Coordinates: 54.916667°N 82.8075°E
- Country: Russia
- Federal subject: Novosibirsk Oblast
- Administrative district: Novosibirsky District

Population
  - Estimate (2010): 334 )
- Time zone: UTC+7 (MSK+4)
- Postal code: 630520
- OKTMO ID: 50640410106

8 Marta (Russian: 8 Марта) is a rural locality (a settlement) in Verkh-Tulinskoye Rural Settlement of Novosibirsky District, Russia. The population was 334 as of 2010.

== Streets ==
- Mira
- Mira 3 etazhka
- Stroiteley

== Geography ==
8 Marta is located 18 km southwest of Novosibirsk (the district's administrative centre) by road. Krasny Vostok is the nearest rural locality.
