= Lokti =

Lokti Локти
- Settlement
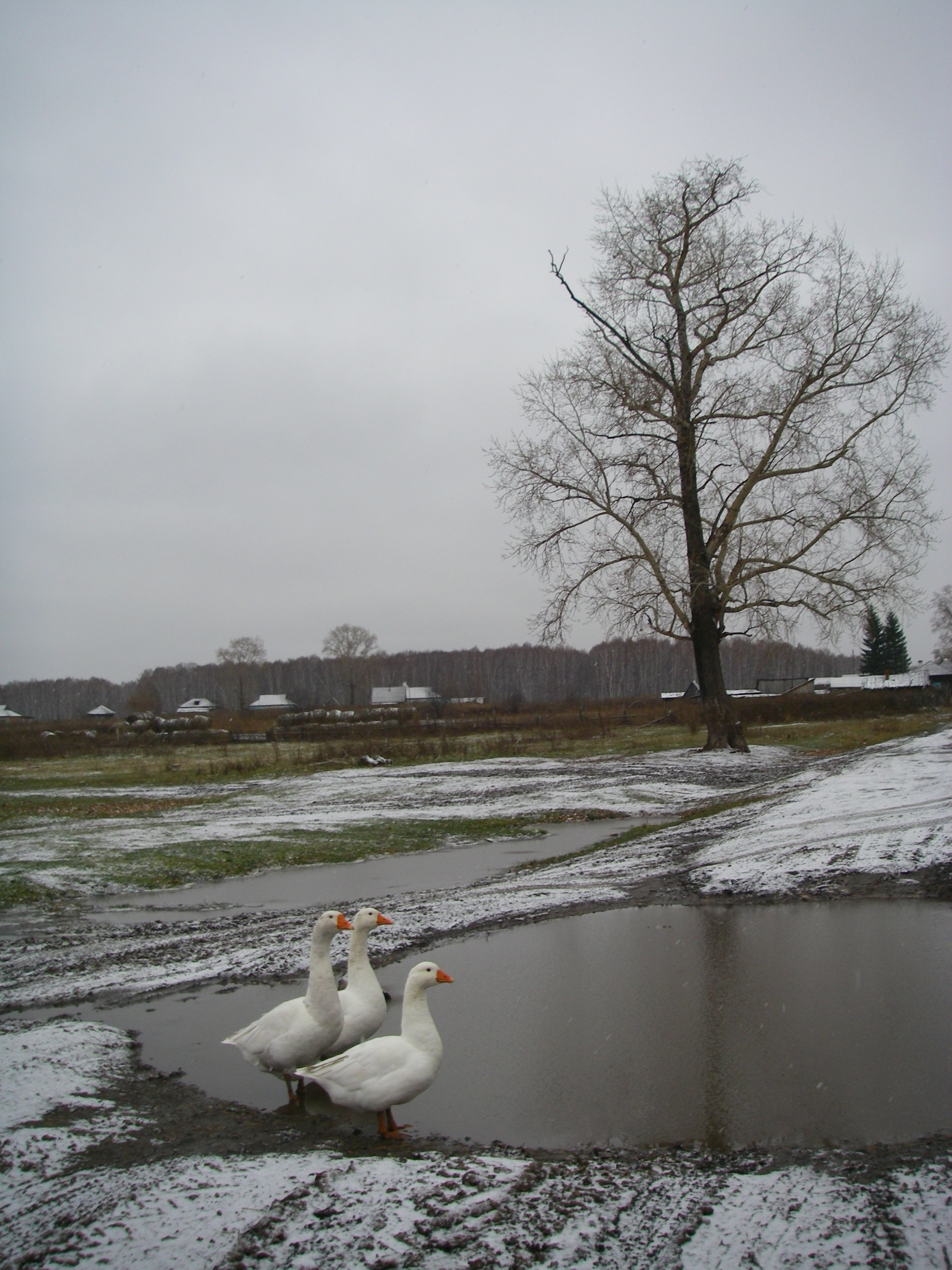

- Location within Novosibirsk Oblast Location within Russia
- Coordinates: 55°16′05″N 83°11′00″E
- Country: Russia
- Region: Novosibirsk Oblast
- District: Moshkovsky District

Lokti (Russian: Локти) is a rural locality (a selo) in Moshkovsky District of Novosibirsk Oblast, Russia. It is part of Barlaksky Selsoviet. Population: 247 (2010 Census).

The rural locality is located northeast of Novosibirsk on the Bolshoi Barlak River.

== History ==
According to the "List of inhabited places of Siberian Krai" (1928) Lokti was founded in 1576, but most likely this date is a mistake, since the Russians had not yet settled in Siberia at that time.

In 1899, shops, a drinking establishment, a grain warehouse and a school were in the village.

== See also ==
- Barlak, a rural locality to the south
