= Goluboy Zaliv, Novosibirsk Oblast =

Goluboy Zaliv Голубой Залив
- Settlement
- Location within Novosibirsk Oblast Location within Russia
- Coordinates: 54°50′00″N 82°54′30″E
- Country: Russia
- Region: Novosibirsk Oblast
- District: Novosibirsky District

Goluboy Zaliv (Russian: Голубой залив) is a settlement (a dachny posyolok) in Novosibirsky District of Novosibirsk Oblast, Russia. It is a part of Morskoy Selsoviet. Population: 238 (2010 Census). Goluboy Zaliv is located between Leninskoye and ObGES Microdistrict of Novosibirsk.
