= Verkh-Irmen =

Verkh-Irmen Верх-Ирмень
- Settlement
- Location within Novosibirsk Oblast Location within Russia
- Coordinates: 54°34′45″N 82°14′30″E
- Country: Russia
- Region: Novosibirsk Oblast
- District: Ordynsky District

Verkh-Irmen (Russian: Верх-Ирмень) is a rural locality (a selo) and the administrative center of Verkh-Irmensky Selsoviet of Ordynsky District, Novosibirsk Oblast, Russia. Population: 3123 (2010 Census). The settlement is located on the Irmen River, it is situated 60 kilometers southwest of Novosibirsk, 32 kilometers northeast of Ordynskoye and 8 kilometers from the coast of the Novosibirsk Reservoir.

== History ==
Verkh-Irmen was first mentioned in 1775.

== Economy ==
- The "Irmen" is an agricultural enterprise, one of the largest milk producers in Novosibirsk Oblast.

== Famous natives ==
- Vyacheslav Larents (born 1994) is a Russian football player.
