= Laptevka, Novosibirsk Oblast =

Laptevka Лаптевка
- Settlement
- Location within Novosibirsk Oblast Location within Russia
- Coordinates: 55°47′25″N 82°18′30″E
- Country: Russia
- Region: Novosibirsk Oblast
- District: Kolyvansky District

Laptevka (Russian: Лаптевка) is a village in the Kolyvansky District of Novosibirsk Oblast, Russia, located on the Vasyugan Swamp. Population: 74 (2010 Census); 111 (2007 Census); 118 (2002 Census).

== History ==
The village is named after the Laptev who founded it.
