= Barlak =

Barlak Барлак
- Selo
- Location within Altai Republic Location within Russia
- Coordinates: 51°29′N 85°33′E
- Country: Russia
- Region: Altai Republic
- District: Shebalinsky District
- Time zone: UTC+7:00

Barlak (Russian: Барлак; Altay: Барлак) is a rural locality (a selo) in Shebalinsky District, the Altai Republic, Russia. The population was 43 as of 2016. There is 1 street.

== Geography ==
Barlak is located 27 km northwest of Shebalino (the district's administrative centre) by road. Cherga is the nearest rural locality.
