= Biaza =

Biaza Биаза
- Selo
- Location within Novosibirsk Oblast Location within Russia
- Coordinates: 56°35′35″N 78°18′10″E
- Country: Russia
- Region: Novosibirsk Oblast
- District: Severny District
- Time zone: UTC+6:00

Biaza (Russian: Биаза) is a rural locality (a selo) in Severny District, Novosibirsk Oblast, Russia. Population: 519 (2010 census); 615 (2002 census);
