= Vyacheslav Larents =

Russian footballer

Personal information
- Full name: Vyacheslav Andreyevich Larents
- Date of birth: 21 September 1994 (age 32)
- Place of birth: Verkh-Irmen, Russia
- Height: 1.83 m (6 ft 0 in)
- Positions: Defender; midfielder

Senior career*
| Years | Team | Apps | (Gls) |
| 2012 | FC Tom Tomsk | 0 | (0) |
| 2013–2014 | FC Sibir-2 Novosibirsk | 21 | (0) |
| 2014–2019 | FC Sibir Novosibirsk | 68 | (0) |
| 2019–2020 | FC Irtysh Omsk | 4 | (0) |
| 2020–2024 | FC Sibir Novosibirsk | 77 | (2) |
- * Club domestic league appearances and goals as of 8 June 2024

Vyacheslav Andreyevich Larents (Russian: Вячеслав Андреевич Ларенц; born 21 September 1994) is a Russian football player.

== Club career ==
He made his debut in the Russian Second Division for FC Sibir-2 Novosibirsk on 23 July 2013 in a game against FC Yakutiya Yakutsk.

He made his Russian Football National League debut for FC Sibir Novosibirsk on 12 July 2014 in a game against FC Volgar Astrakhan.
