= Kruglikovo =

Kruglikovo Кругликово
- Interactive map of Kruglikovo
- Location of Kruglikovo Kruglikovo (Novosibirsk Oblast)
- Coordinates: 55.8380°N 83.8523°E
- Country: Russia
- Federal subject: Novosibirsk Oblast
- Administrative district: Bolotninsky District
- Rural councilSelsoviet: Karasyovo

Area
  - Total: 0.52 km^{2} (0.20 sq mi)

Population (2010 Census)
  - Total: 280
  - Estimate (2010): 280 (0%)
  - Density: 540/km^{2} (1,400/sq mi)
- Time zone: UTC+7 (MSK+4)
- Postal codes: 632357, 633357
- OKTMO ID: 50606422111

Kruglikovo (Russian: Кругликово) is a village in the Bolotninsky District of Novosibirsk Oblast, Russia.

Its population in 2010 was 280 (of them, 137 men and 143 women) The jurisdiction of the village is 52 hectares (0.52 km^{2}). It has one school and one medical facility.

== Geography and transportation ==
The village is located on the confluence of the Iksa and Ob rivers. It is connected by road to district administrative center, Bolotnoye, through the smaller village Nasonovo and the rural council seat of Karasyovo.
