= Gusiny Brod =

Gusiny Brod Гусиный Брод
- Settlement
- Location within Novosibirsk Oblast Location within Russia
- Coordinates: 55°04′02″N 83°14′26″E
- Country: Russia
- Region: Novosibirsk Oblast
- District: Novosibirsky District

Gusiny Brod (Russian: Гусиный Брод) is a settlement (a selo) in Novosibirsky District of Novosibirsk Oblast, Russia. It is part of Razdolnensky Selsovet.

== History ==
In 1926, the settlement had 123 households and 605 residents (291 men, 314 women; mostly Zyryans). It was the center of Gusino-Brodsky Selsovet of Kamensky District, Novosibirsky District, Siberian Krai.

== Religious buildings ==
- St. Nicholas Church is a wooden Orthodox church built not earlier than 2005.
