= Baryshevo, Novosibirsk Oblast =

Baryshevo Барышево
- Settlement
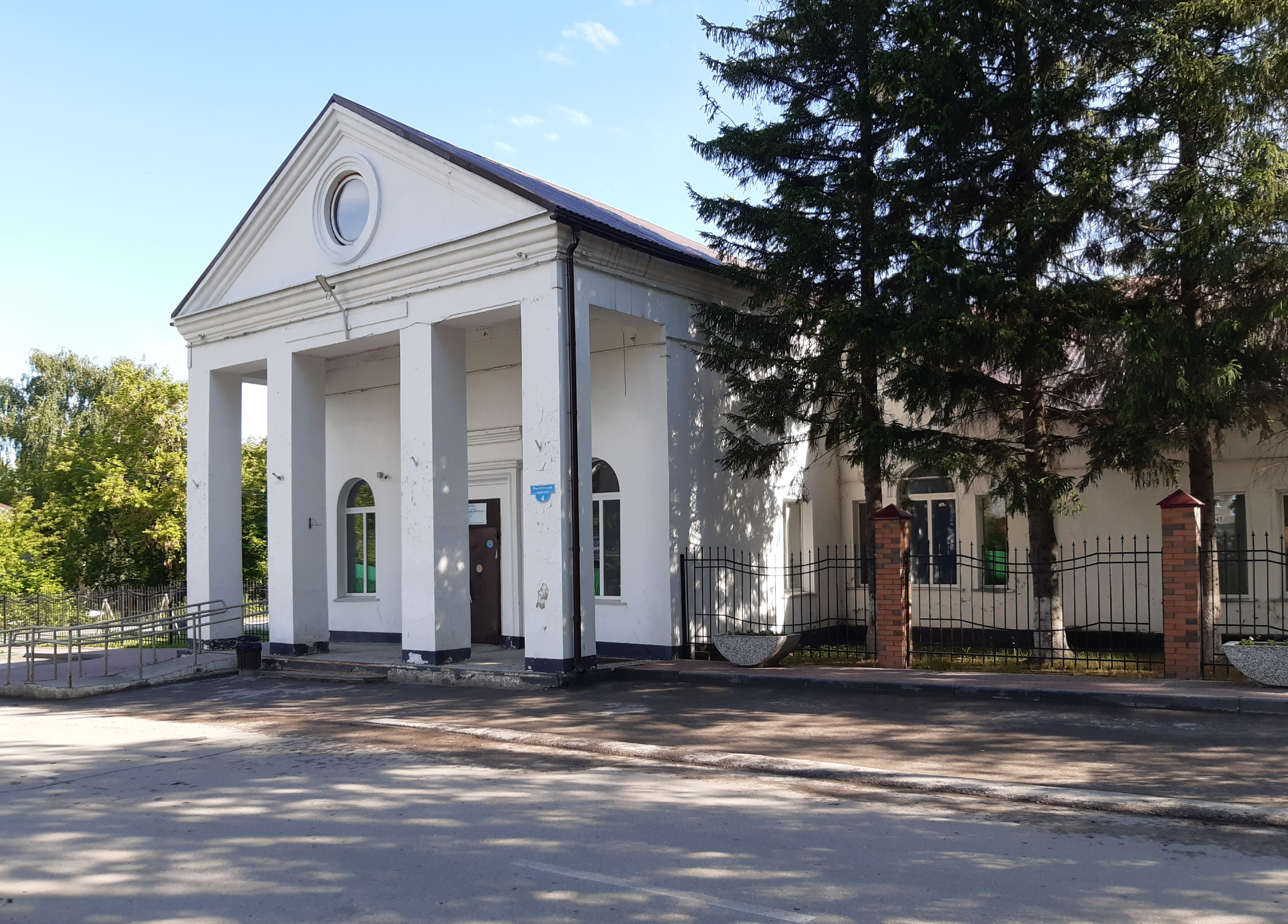

- Location within Novosibirsk Oblast Location within Russia
- Coordinates: 54°57′22″N 83°11′07″E
- Country: Russia
- Region: Novosibirsk Oblast
- District: Novosibirsky District

Baryshevo (Russian: Барышево) is a settlement (a selo) in Novosibirsky District of Novosibirsk Oblast, Russia. The administrative center of Baryshevsky Selsoviet. It is bordered by Pervomaysky District of Novosibirsk. The settlement is deeply integrated into the infrastructure of Novosibirsk Agglomeration.

== History ==
According to the List of Settlements 1926, the village was founded in 1775 but this date of foundation may be erroneous.

According to the List of Inhabited Places of the Tomsk Governorate of 1859, the village of Barysheva (Balysheva) was located on the left bank of the Inya River, at a distance of 230 versts from Tomsk and had 35 households, 232 inhabitants (120 men, 112 women).

In 1893, 70 households and 683 people (345 men and 338 women) lived in the settlement. The population growth was associated with migration from the European part of Russia and Tobolsk Governorate. Natural population growth was also significant.

By the end of the 19th century, a wooden Orthodox church and a parish school were built in Baryshevo, the village received the status of a selo.

According to the List of Inhabited Places of the Tomsk Governorate of 1911, Baryshevo was part of the Kamensk Volost, Tomsk Uyezd, Tomsk Governorate, and had 236 households, 1160 inhabitants (562 men and 598 women), three trade shops, one of which was a state wine shop.

According to the First All-Union Population Census in 1926, the settlement had 408 households and 2004 people (956 men, 1048 women).

In the late 1920s and early 1930s, Baryshevo was part of Kamensky Raion, Novosibirsk Okrug; a village council, a school of the 1st stage, a library, a reading room, a credit partnership, three shops of a consumer society were located in the settlement.

== Economy ==
- Novo-Baryshevskaya Poltry Factory is a producer of chicken meat, eggs and sausages. One of the largest poultry factories of Novosibirsk Oblast. The company exports eggs to various regions of Russia, as well as to Central Asia and Mongolia. The poultry factory is part of the Ptitsefabrika Oktyabrskaya Group of Companies headquartered in Novosibirsk.
- Pilot Plant

== Medicine ==
- Palliative Department of the Novosibirsk Clinical District Hospital No. 1

== Notable natives ==
- Nina Grekhova (born 1941) is a Russian poet.
- Pyotr Zhuravlyov (born 1950) is a Soviet and Russian scientist in the field of electron optics, the director of the TDIAM SB RAS (2001—?).
- Suharenchova Natalia (born 1931) - the former director of school No. 9, received the status of Honored Geography Teacher of the Novosibirsk oblast for helping to restore the education system after World War II
