= Fedosikha, Novosibirsk Oblast =

Fedosikha Федосиха
- Settlement
- Location within Novosibirsk Oblast Location within Russia
- Coordinates: 54°47′04″N 81°53′34″E
- Country: Russia
- Region: Novosibirsk Oblast
- District: Kochenyovsky District

Fedosikha (Russian: Федосиха) is a settlement (a selo) in Kochenyovsky District of Novosibirsk Oblast, Russia. The administrative center of Fedosikhinsky Selsoviet.

== History ==
Fedosikha was founded at the end of the 18th century on the Fedosikha River. The first inhabitants of the village were Old Believers, as indicated by the characteristic burials. Ryazanka, Yalgai, Orlovskaya, Mogilevskaya, Tambovskaya, Ishim streets were formed in the settlement, the families of the Dvoryadkins, Kruzhalovs, Zlobins, Romanovs, Gulyaevs, Lutskys, Nikulnikovs, Litvyakovs, Kodins, Salmins, Peshkovs, Popovs and others lived here.

According to the data of 1904, Fedosikha was part of Ekaterininskaya Volost, Barnaul Uyezd, Tomsk Governorate. There were 245 households and 1413 residents, a literacy school, a state-owned wine shop, a butter factory with departments.

In 1907, a church was built in the village, after which Fedosikha received the status of a selo.

In 1919, the Commune of Karl Marx was formed from 17 households of the settlement, later collective farms (kolkhozes) named after Kuibyshev, Sibkombain, and Krasny Geroy appeared in Fedosikha.

In 1926, the settlement had 529 households and 2858 people (mostly Russians), there were a school, a butter factory, two shops and a credit partnership.

In 1931, the state Verkh-Karasuksky Kolkhoz was created (former Molochny Sovkhoz No. 213).

In June 1950, all the kolkhozes of the settlement merged into the Kolkhoz named after Kuibyshev.

== Enterprises ==
- Kompaniya Russky Dvor is a manufacturer of pelmeni and other semi-finished products, founded in the mid-2010s. In 2020, the company's profit amounted to 402,000 rubles, the revenue was estimated at 5,166,000 rubles.

== Notable natives ==
- Alexander Antsupov (1924–2019) was a Hero of the Soviet Union.
