= Buses in Novosibirsk =

Part of public transit network in Russia

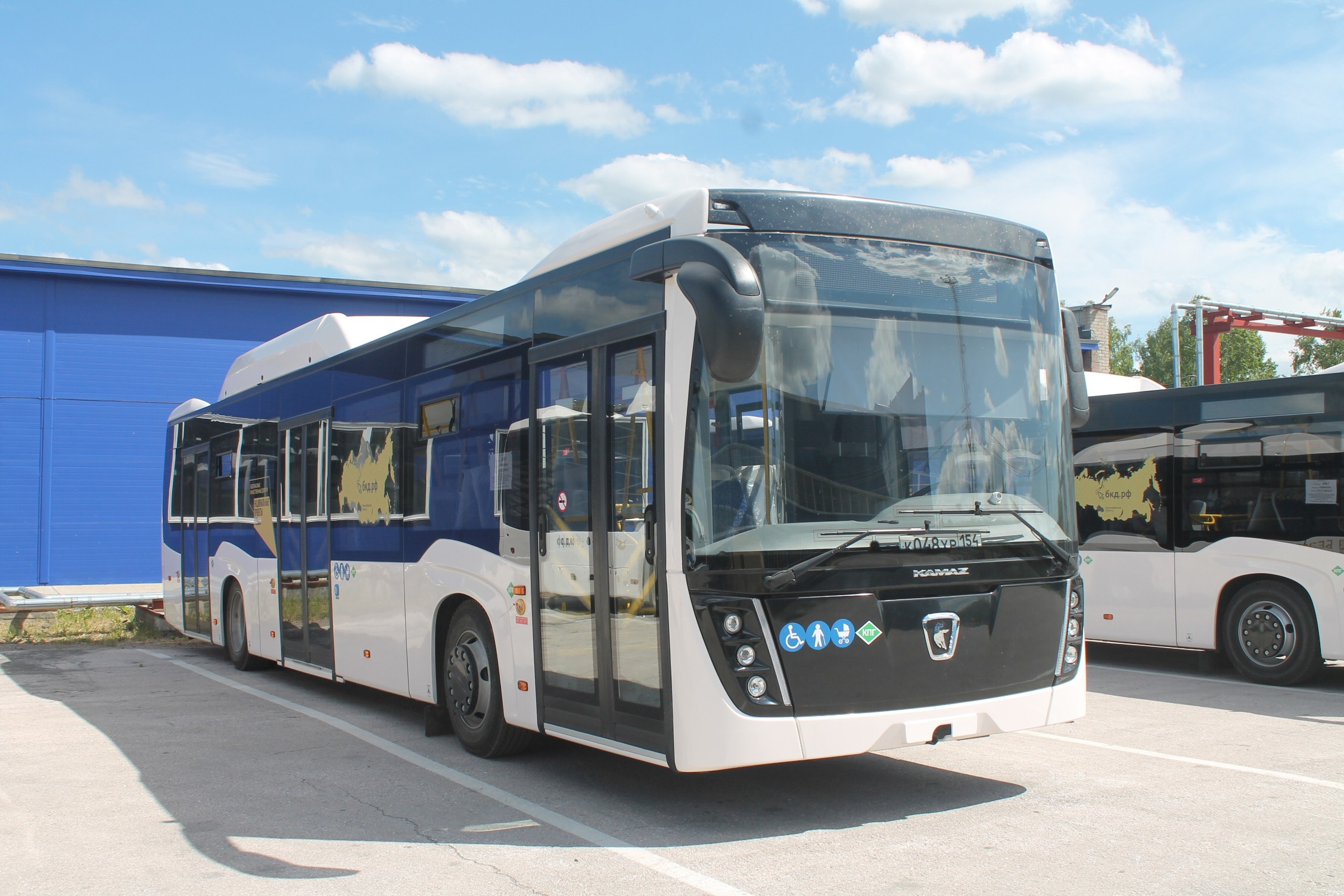

Overview
- Locale: Novosibirsk, Russia
- Transit type: Bus
- Number of lines: 69

Operation
- Began operation: 1923
- Operator: Various
- Number of vehicles: PAZ-3205, LiAZ-5256, LiAZ-5293, MAZ-103, MAZ-104, MAZ-206, MAZ-226, NefAZ-5299

The Novosibirsk bus system (Russian: Новосибирский автобус) is part of the public transport network of Novosibirsk, Russia. The system was launched in 1923.

== History ==
The first route was launched in the summer of 1923: the buses ran between the railway station, city center and Zakamenka district (the area where now the State Public Scientific & Technological Library is located).

In 1937 the Novosibirsk bus system comprised 30 buses and 4 routes.

In 1985 the bus fleet had more than 1600 buses.

Since the 1990s, alongside the municipal operator, a private carriers serve bus routes in Novosibirsk.

== Current status ==
The system consists of 52 routes served by buses over 10 metres long (№№ 3, 4, 5, 6, 7, 8, 11, 13, 14, 16, 18, 18к, 20, 21, 23, 28, 29, 30, 31, 32, 34, 35, 36, 37, 39, 41, 42, 44, 45, 46, 50, 51, 53, 54, 55, 57, 59, 60, 61, 64, 65, 68, 69, 73, 77, 79, 88, 91, 95, 96, 97, 98) and 17 routes served by smaller buses (№№ 1, 9, 10, 15, 19, 24, 27, 40, 43, 48, 49, 52, 52к, 58, 67, 72, 74).

The bus fleet includes such models as Russian PAZ-3205, LiAZ-5256, LiAZ-5293, and NefAZ-5299, Belarusian MAZ-103, MAZ-104, MAZ-206, and MAZ-226 with an internal combustion engine. Local authorities planned that at least 50% of buses will be natural gas vehicles by 2020. In 2012, special battery electric bus based on NefAZ-5299 was tested.

== Gallery ==
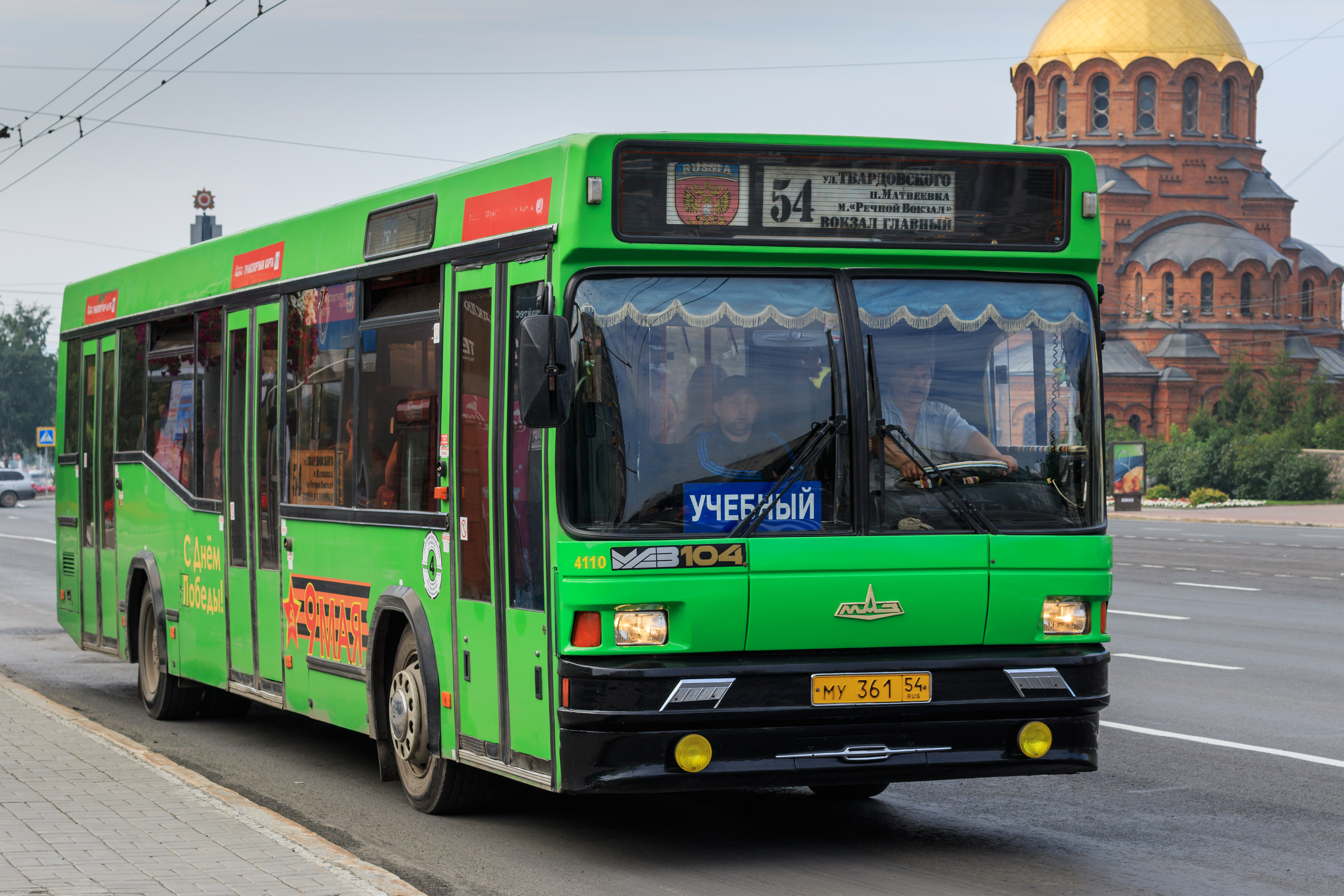
