= III Internatsional =

III Internatsional III Интернационал
- Settlement
- Location within Novosibirsk Oblast Location within Russia
- Coordinates: 53.753056°N 77.3025°E
- Country: Russia
- Region: Novosibirsk Oblast
- District: Bagansky District
- Time zone: UTC+06:00

III Internatsional (Russian: III Интернационал) is a rural locality (a settlement) in Andreyevsky Selsoviet of Bagansky District, Russia. The population was 44 as of 2010.

== Streets ==
- Tsentralnaya

== Geography ==
III Internatsional is located 54 km southwest of Bagan (the district's administrative centre) by road. Saratovka and Rayonnaya are the nearest rural localities.
