= Ordynsky District =

Ordynsky District Ордынский район (Russian)
- District
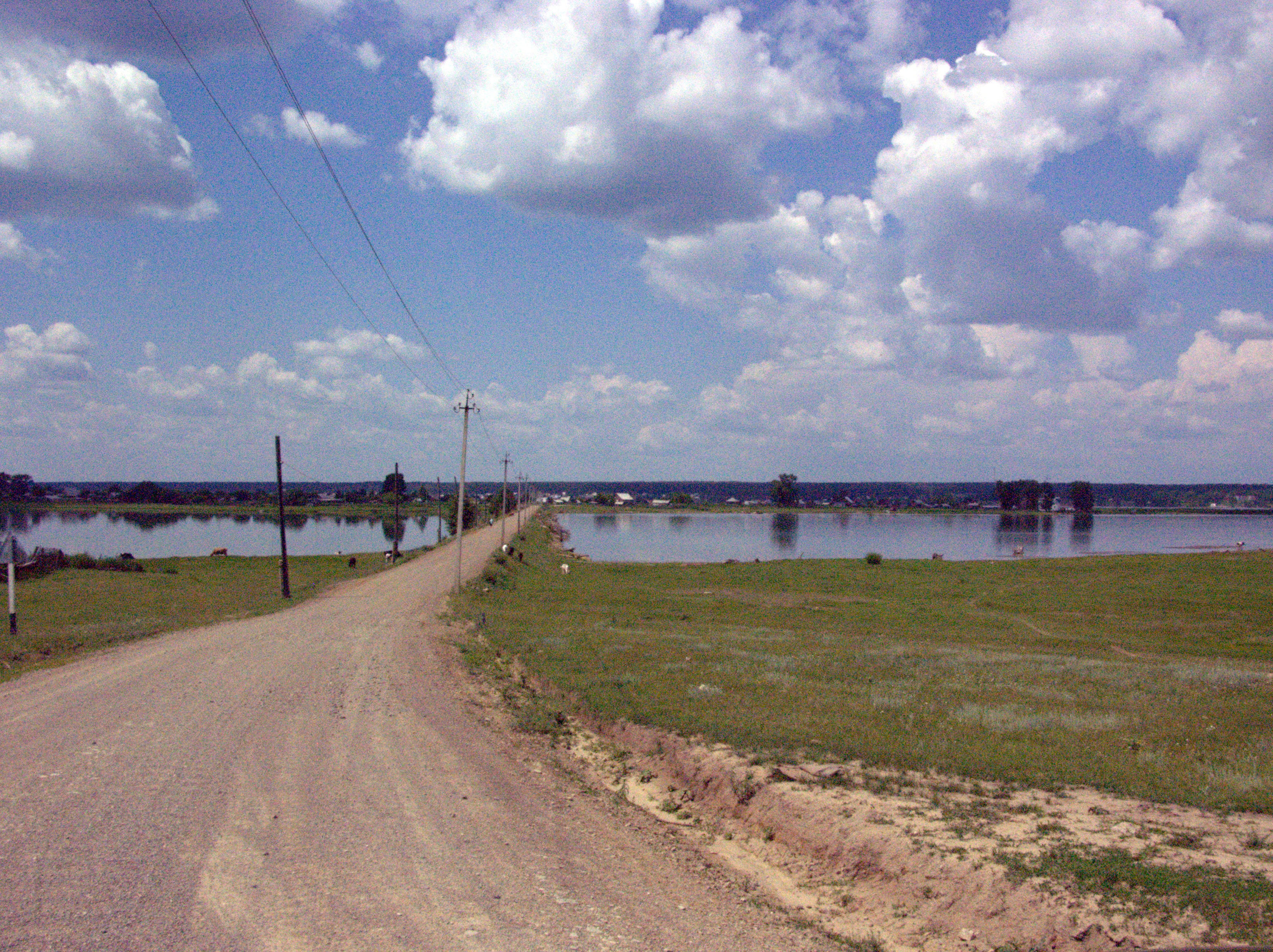
- Road to island, Ordynsky District

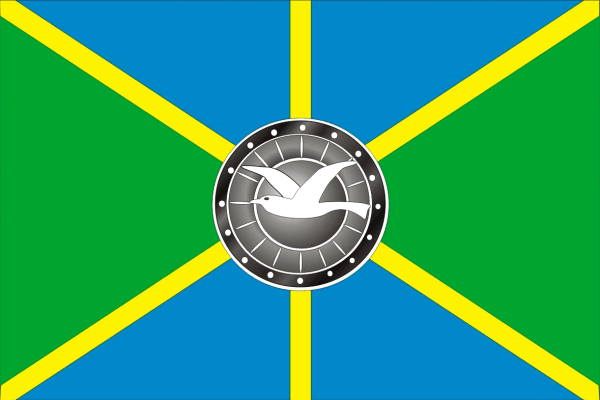
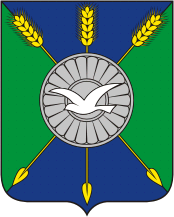
- Flag Coat of arms
- Location of Ordynsky District in Novosibirsk Oblast
- Coordinates: 54°22′N 81°54′E
- Country: Russia
- Federal subject: Novosibirsk Oblast
- Established: 25 May 1925
- Administrative center: Ordynskoye

Area
  - Total: 4,389 km^{2} (1,695 sq mi)

Population (2010 Census)
  - Total: 36,708
  - Density: 8.364/km^{2} (21.66/sq mi)
  - Urban: 27.9%
  - Rural: 72.1%

Administrative structure
  - Inhabited localities: 1 urban-type settlements, 39 rural localities

Municipal structure
  - Municipally incorporated as: Ordynsky Municipal District
  - Municipal divisions: 1 urban settlements, 20 rural settlements
- Time zone: UTC+7 (MSK+4)
- OKTMO ID: 50642000
- Website: http://ordynsk.nso.ru

Ordynsky District (Russian: Ордынский райо́н) is an administrative and municipal district (raion), one of the thirty in Novosibirsk Oblast, Russia. It is located in the southeast of the oblast. The area of the district is 4,748 square kilometers (1,833 sq mi). Its administrative center is the urban locality (a work settlement) of Ordynskoye. Population: 36,708 (2010 Census); 39,209 (2002 census); 38,231 (1989 Soviet census). The population of Ordynskoye accounts for 27.9% of the district's total population.

== Notable residents ==
- Vyacheslav Larents (born 1994 in Verkh-Irmen), footballer
