= Ordynskoye =

Ordynskoye Ордынское
- Urban-type settlement
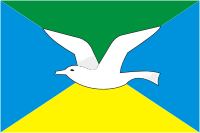
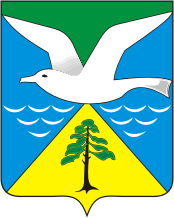
- Flag Coat of arms
- Interactive map of Ordynskoye
- Location of Ordynskoye Ordynskoye (Novosibirsk Oblast)
- Coordinates: 54.3666°N 81.9045°E
- Country: Russia
- Federal subject: Novosibirsk Oblast
- Administrative district: Ordynsky District
- Elevation: 120 m (390 ft)

Population (2010 Census)
  - Total: 10,256
  - Estimate (2025): 9,330 (−9%)
- Time zone: UTC+7 (MSK+4)
- Postal code: 633261
- OKTMO ID: 50642151051

Ordynskoye (Russian: Ордынское) is an urban locality (an urban-type settlement) in Ordynsky District of Novosibirsk Oblast, Russia. Population: 10,256 (2010 census); 10,448 (2002 census); 9,505 (1989 Soviet census).
