= Inya (river) =

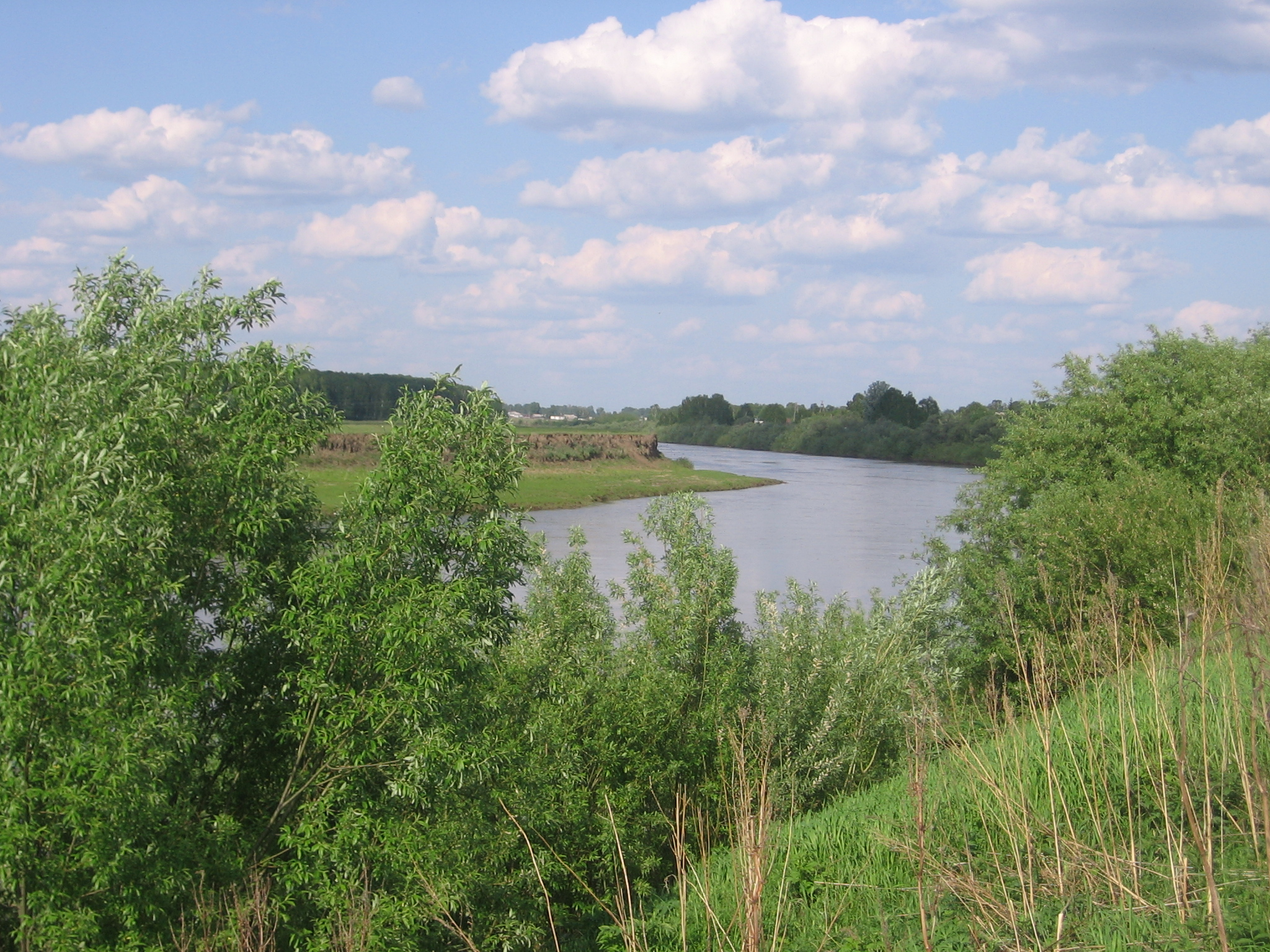
- Inya river (confluence of Ob) near Sarapulka village

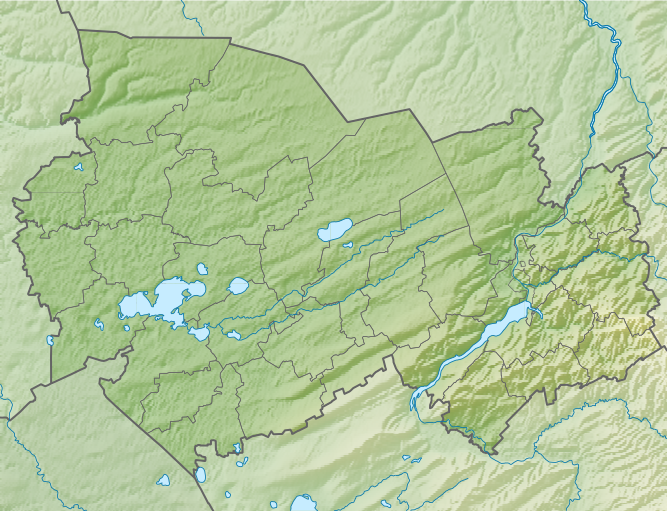
- Mouth location in Novosibirsk Oblast, Russia

Location
- Country: Russia

Physical characteristics
- Source: Kuznetsk Basin
- Mouth: Ob
  - location: Novosibirsk
  - coordinates: 54.9732°N 82.9763°E
- Length: 663 km (412 mi)
- Basin size: 17,600 km^{2} (6,800 sq mi)

Basin features
- Progression: Ob→ Kara Sea

The Inya (Russian: Иня́, pronounced [ɪˈnʲæ]) is a river in Kemerovo and Novosibirsk Oblasts of Russia. It is a right tributary of the Ob. It is 663 kilometres (412 mi) long, with a drainage basin of 17,600 square kilometres (6,800 mi^{2}).

By the Inya lie the towns of Leninsk-Kuznetsky and Toguchin. The river flows through a rather densely populated area, and is crossed by several railway lines.

== Course ==
The Inya has its sources in a ridge in the central part of the Kuznetsk Basin, and flows through Kemerovo Olast in a mainly westerly direction, then enters Novosibirsk Oblast and finally joins the Ob, just 5 kilometres (3 mi) southeast of downtown Novosibirsk.

At the village of Beryosovka, some 30 kilometres (19 mi) from its mouth, the river's average discharge is 470 cubic metres per second (17,000 cu ft/s). The minimum discharge in February is 8.6 cubic metres per second (300 cu ft/s), and the maximum is in May at 195 cubic metres per second (6,900 cu ft/s). Near the mouth the river is some 60 metres (200 ft) wide and 1.5 metres (4.9 ft) deep.

Its main tributaries are the Kasma, Ur and Bachat. The river freezes over in the beginning of November, and stays frozen till the spring thaw starts in mid-April.

== See also ==
- List of rivers of Russia
