= Novosibirsky District =

Novosibirsky District Новосибирский район (Russian)
- District
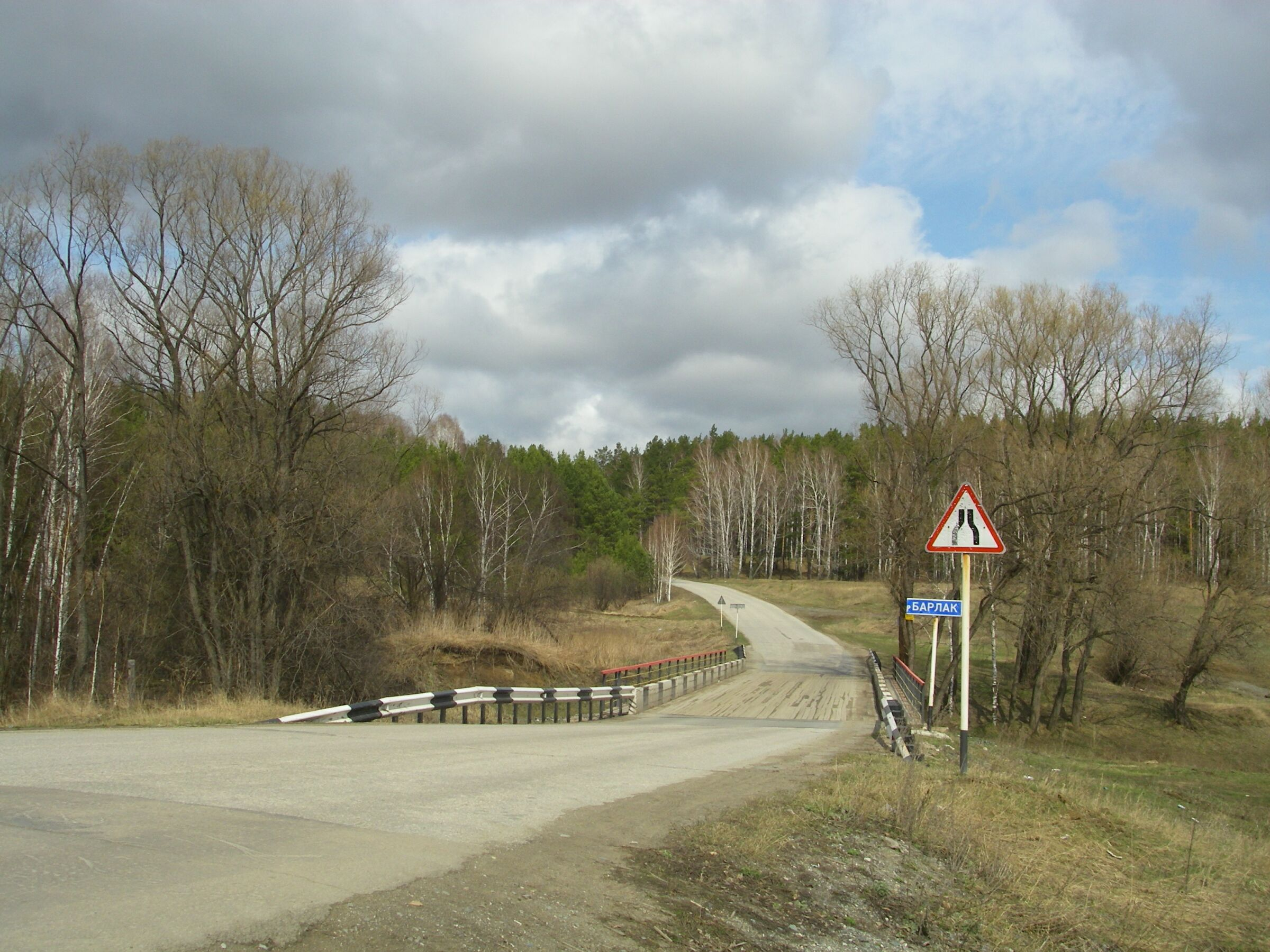
- Bridge over the Barlak River, Novosibirsky District

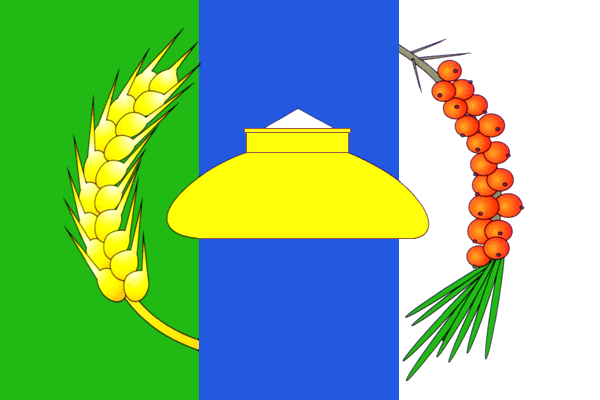
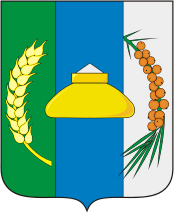
- Flag Coat of arms
- Location of Novosibirsky District in Novosibirsk Oblast
- Coordinates: 55°01′N 82°56′E
- Country: Russia
- Federal subject: Novosibirsk Oblast
- Established: 1420 (Julian)
- Administrative center: Novosibirsk

Area
  - Total: 2,900 km^{2} (1,100 sq mi)

Population (2010 Census)
  - Total: 127,891
  - Density: 44/km^{2} (110/sq mi)
  - Urban: 24.1%
  - Rural: 75.9%

Administrative structure
  - Inhabited localities: 4 urban-type settlements, 78 rural localities

Municipal structure
  - Municipally incorporated as: Novosibirsky Municipal District
  - Municipal divisions: 1 urban settlements, 17 rural settlements
- Time zone: UTC+7 (MSK+4)
- OKTMO ID: 50640000
- Website: https://nsr.nso.ru/

Novosibirsky District (Russian: Новосиби́рский райо́н) is an administrative and municipal district (raion), one of the thirty in Novosibirsk Oblast, Russia. It is located in the east of the oblast. The area of the district is 2,900 square kilometers (1,100 sq mi). Its administrative center is the city of Novosibirsk (which is not administratively a part of the district). Population: 127,891 (2010 Census); 113,047 (2002 census); 130,300 (1989 Soviet census).

== Administrative and municipal status ==
Within the framework of administrative divisions, Novosibirsky District is one of the thirty in the oblast. The city of Novosibirsk serves as its administrative center, despite being incorporated separately as an administrative unit with the status equal to that of the districts.

As a municipal division, the territory of the district is split between two municipal formations—Koltsovo Urban Okrug, which the work settlement of Koltsovo is incorporated as, and Novosibirsky Municipal District, which covers the rest of the administrative district's territory. The City of Novosibirsk is incorporated separately from the district as Novosibirsk Urban Okrug.
