= Yevgeny Chuplinsky =

Russian serial killer (born 1965)

- Евгений Чуплинский
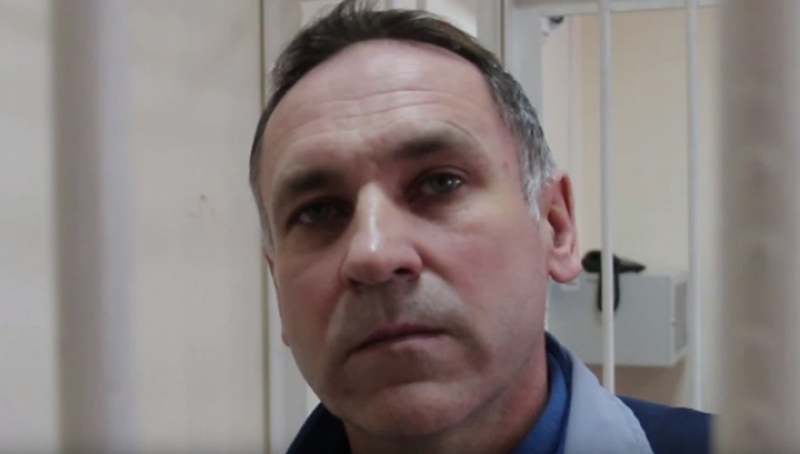
- Born: Yevgeny Alexandrovich Chuplinsky; 14 March 1965 (age 61); Novosibirsk, Novosibirsk Oblast, RSFSR, Soviet Union
- Other name: See aliases: "The Maniac of Novosibirsk" "The Novosibirsk Maniac" "The Novosibirsk Ripper" "The Policeman Maniac" "The Policeman Ripper" "The Satanist Maniac" "The Occult Maniac" "The Siberian Monster" "The Siberian Ripper" "The Siberian Chikatilo" "Chupa-Chups"
- Conviction: Murder × 19
- Penalty: Life imprisonment

Details
- Victims: 19–29
- Span of crimes: 1998–2005
- Country: Russia
- State: Novosibirsk
- Date apprehended: 23 April 2016
- Imprisoned at: Snezhinka Colony, Elban, Khabarovsk Krai

Yevgeny Alexandrovich Chuplinsky (Russian: Евгений Александрович Чуплинский; born 14 March 1965), known as The Novosibirsk Maniac (Russian: Новосибирский маньяк), is a Russian serial killer who killed at least 19 prostitutes in the Novosibirsk Oblast from 1998 to 2005. The murders were accompanied by dismemberment, extensive mutilations and removal of victims' hearts. Despite large-scale investigations by police and several arrests, Chuplinsky was only arrested in 2016, and sentenced to life imprisonment two years later.

== Early life ==
Yevgeny Chuplinsky was born on 14 March 1965, in the city of Novosibirsk. Little is known about his upbringing, but he graduated from school with average grades, and in 1981, he entered a mechanical engineering college. While studying, he was an active member of the Komsomol.

Between 1984 and 1987, he served with the Soviet Border Troops, where he received physical, ideological and combat training, mastering sambo. Among his colleagues, he gained infamy as a mercantile hypocrite who, at every opportunity, tried to attract positive attention from his superiors. After finishing his service, he enlisted in the police force, where he rose to the rank of sergeant. He first worked as a security guard in the Kirovsky District, but in 2000, he was transferred to the Leninsky District. In 2003, he retired with a medal for serving with distinction, along with 46 letters of gratitude and recommendations from his employers. After his retirement, with the help of his wife's parents, Chuplinsky founded a chain of shops where he sold wall decorations made from metal. He married three times and had two children.

== Murders ==
In 1998, Chuplinsky bought a Lada Samara, after which he began to earn money as a taxi driver. In November of that year, he committed his first murder. After that, the bodies of murdered prostitutes were discovered in various desolate areas around Novosibirsk, such as landfills, windbreaks, and hard shoulders of roads. The victims were beheaded and extensively mutilated, arrows and pentagrams carved on the skin and various amulets were often found near the crime scenes. The investigators could not reach a consensus whether the killings were ritualistic in nature, or Chuplinsky had done it to simply mislead the authorities. The killer also never hid the bodies, preferring to place them in easy-to-find locations. Due to their disfigurements, some of the victims were never identified.

After years of treating them as separate cases, the murders were combined into one case, making it clear that a serial killer was operating in the area. However, this revelation did not aid the investigation: although two identikits were compiled, they differed from one another, and neither was considered an accurate sketch of the offender. By the mid-2000s, the murders suddenly ceased, leading the investigators to believe that the murderer had been jailed for another offence or was deceased. As a result, his age and possible motives remained unclear for some time.

In October 2015, a taxi driver named Alexei Ivanov was arrested by investigators who suspected him of being the Novosibirsk Maniac. While Ivanov later confessed to and was convicted of several unrelated murders, he was ultimately cleared from those attributed to the Maniac of Novosibirsk.

== First and second arrest ==
Chuplinsky first came to the attention of the investigators in 2004, even before the murders were combined into one, in connection to the disappearance of one woman, whose body was never found. On the night of her disappearance, a new SIM card was inserted into the victim's mobile phone, registered to Yevgeny Chuplinsky. The detainee said that he worked as a taxi driver, and that two young men to whom he had given a lift had left the phone in his car. When he was asked to give an official testimony, Chuplinsky changed his story, claiming that the young men had unsuccessfully attempted to rob him, and had dropped the phone in the process. The changing stories seemed insignificant to the investigators, who later released him.

In 2006, when all the cases were combined, much circumstantial evidence pointed towards Chuplinsky. In particular, although he claimed to have never met one of the victims, investigations had uncovered that she was a prostitute who was familiar with Chuplinsky. His own co-workers told of rumours that he ran a protection racket centred on sex workers, including in areas where some murders took place. Because of this, Chuplinsky was arrested. While interviewing witnesses for possible further clues, authorities found that in 2000 Chuplinsky was forced to switch workplaces because of the aforementioned rumours. Some prostitutes claimed that after they had been questioned by authorities, Chuplinsky would in turn interrogate them about what they had said in great detail. One of his garages was inspected with the help of a police dog, but despite its strange behaviour, no bodies were located. Since there was insubstantial evidence to keep him detained, Chuplinsky was released.

== Final arrest, trial and sentence ==
In 2016, the Investigative Committee began conducting tests using DNA, requesting that all suspects, including Chuplinsky, provide a sample. The results showed that semen from the scene of one murder and sweat from two others were positive matches to Chuplinsky, who was subsequently arrested and charged with 17 murders on April 23, 2016.

In January 2017, Chuplinsky was declared sane following a psychological and psychiatric examination. During the interrogations, he confessed to killing a total of 29 women; however, on 14 April 2017, he was charged with only 19 counts of murder due to insufficient evidence. Chuplinsky subsequently recanted his testimony. During the investigation, more than eight thousand witnesses were interviewed regarding the case.

On 28 February 2018, Yevgeny Chuplinsky was found guilty by jury verdict of 19 murders and one theft and sentenced to life imprisonment in a corrective labour colony. On 28 September, the verdict was cancelled and the case returned to court because some of the cases' statute of limitations had expired (under the Russian criminal code, the statute of limitations for murders is 15 years). Two months later, Chuplinsky was again convicted in his second trial and re-sentenced to life imprisonment. As of September 2019, he is serving his sentence at the Snezhinka Labor Colony in the village of Elban, Khabarovsk Krai.

== Victims ==
The Russian media under-reported the names and backgrounds of Chuplinsky's victims. Due to his propensity for amputation or decapitation, often all that was found of victims were isolated hands, feet, or their head. Below is the information known as of February 2023.

- The first victim remains unidentified. Her relatives were never found, and despite a reconstruction of her face and genetic profile, no positive identification was ever made. In all documents, she is referred to as "woman #1." The killing took place one month after Chuplinsky got married on 19 November 1998.
- In 1999, the police found 19-year-old Yevgenia S., who was a sex worker. Her exact date of death is unconfirmed as is her cause of death; however, it is suspected that she was suffocated to death. She was last seen on 2 January 1999, but some acquaintances still received SMS communications from her as late as 21 February 1999. Partial remains were found five days later, and the rest of her body was found on 19 April 1999.
- On 27 May 1999, the head of a third victim was found, but no cause of death was determined although investigators presumed suffocation. She remains unidentified, and investigators refer to her as "woman #3."
- On 18 October 1999, a decapitated body was discovered. She remains unidentified, but her cause of death is presumed to be suffocation. Nearby, a bonfire site was found to contain fragments of clothing belonging to a male and a female.
- 28-year-old Svetlana A. was found on 2 November 1999. She was a sex worker who suffered from drug addiction. A missing persons report was filed for her on 2 October 1999. Her cause of death is presumed to be suffocation, but her body also showed signs of beating, broken bones, and several stab wounds. She was decapitated, sexually assaulted, and sperm, which investigators collected as DNA evidence, was left on her body. As with previous victims, the assailant left behind used condoms.
- Two amputated hands were discovered on 1 April 2000, but investigators were not informed. On 21 April 2000, another individual found a female head, and it was determined that the head and hands belonged to the same person. The remains were subsequently identified as those of Svetlana S., who was a sex worker. On 17 April 2000, pedestrians found her torso with her breasts removed.
- On 27 May 2000, two schoolboys found a leg. The same boys found the second leg on 9 June 2000, yet nothing else was ever recovered. Investigators identified her as "woman #7." Her true identity remains unknown to this day.
- On 20 April 2000, a fifth-grade schoolboy found the head of a woman in a landfill near the ELSIB factory. He initially thought it was a mannequin and used it to scare his friends, who identified it as a real human head. It belonged to 21-year-old Svetlana S. (distinct from Svetlana S. who was found on 1 April 2000). She had left technical college to become a sex worker. Her last known actions were a visit to a client on 19 January 2000, but four separate witnesses confirmed his alibi that she left his apartment alive.
- Thirty-one-year-old Irina B., mother of a 12-year-old boy, was listed as missing in late January 2001. She died from suffocation and was found on 16 March 2001. Her limbs and head had been amputated, and only her torso was initially found. With this murder, Chuplinsky neatly wrapped portions of her body in newspaper and buried them. It took a month for detectives to reconstruct her face sufficiently for identification. Unlike many of his other victims, Irina B. was a deputy chief editor at a specialized accounting firm. She regularly went out in the evenings and was a reliable employee.
- Two teenagers found the severed head of an unidentified "woman #10" on 7 April 2001. Although the victim was strangled, It was not possible to conclusively rule whether that was the cause of death because the coroner could not confirm whether it had happened pre- or post-mortem.
- On 28 March 2002, three 10-year-old boys found the severed head of a woman wrapped in a man's shirt. She was posthumously decapitated, was never identified, and is referred to as "woman #11."
- "Woman #12," who also remains unidentified, was discovered by two brothers on 19 April 2003. As the brothers searched for firewood, one brother picked up a bundle, out of which her severed head fell. Six days later, a garbage bag with a BMW emblem on it was found nearby. The contents included blood-stained clothing which was genetically linked to the severed head found by the brothers.
- The severed head of another Svetlana A. was found on 1 May 2003, but her other remains were never found. She had been missing since 15 April 2003 and had been working for an escort agency.
- Irina P. was found on 10 May 2004. She was identified because her torso was wrapped in a sweater that her mother had made her wear when she left the house on 28 November 2003. Despite indications of a stabbing, her cause of death was determined to be strangulation.
- A man, his wife, and their daughter went for a stroll on 3 July 2004. During their walk, the man noticed a bundle, which he kicked. The kick dislodged the skull of "woman #15." The family returned to the city and reported their finding. Despite a facial reconstruction based on the skull, the victim was never identified.
- Mariya Shumilova, known as Masha, was 31 years old and on crutches due to a broken leg at the time of her death. On the night of 18 June 2004, she celebrated her birthday with a friend. She communicated with her mother at 10:50 PM that she was on her way home but was never heard from again. Her mother filed a missing persons report on 7 July 2004 after Masha's sister told her mother that Masha was a sex worker and had been for months. Shumilova's body was never recovered, but her cellphone was found in Chuplinsky's car and led to his first arrest. Chuplinsky claims that he threw her over the Dimitrov Bridge into the Ob River.
- A mushroom picker found the remains of "woman #17," who was between 23 and 25 years old, on 27 September 2004 near the Novosibirsk Reservoir. Her severed head was wrapped in a pair of jeans.
- Nineteen-year-old Anna E. was found on 2 October 2004. A young couple was making shish kebab in a local suburb of Novosibirsk when the man went to explore a nearby forest. There, he found a pair of jeans with the legs wrapped together with wire. He picked the jeans up and found the severed head of "woman #18" inside. The couple flagged down a road patrol officer who happened to drive by and informed him of the discovery. "Woman #18" was not identified until 2009, when the genetic profile of her mother was sampled. This helped to identify the victim as Anna E., who had left her home in 2000 and become a sex worker. She was reported missing in the fall of 2004.
- The final known victim was found on 11 June 2006. Two young men found a cellophane bag in thickets that they were trying to cut down. The men had been in the area only seven days before and had not seen the cellophane bag at that time. The bag contained a skull; six separate vertebrae, a clavicle bone, 15 ribs, and a long bone were all found in the same area after investigators conducted a search. The remains all shared the same genetic make-up, and the victim was identified as being somewhere between 27 and 32 years old. Her identity remains unknown though Chuplinsky claims that he killed her either in the winter of 2002 or 2003.

== In popular culture ==
- Documentary film "The Double Life of Sergeant Chuplinsky" from the series "Investigation by Eduard Petrov"(2018)
- Documentary film "The Maniac in Uniform" from the series "The Line of Defense" (2019)
- Documentary film "The Siberian Monster" from the series "On the Trail of a Monster" (2020)
- Documentary film "Lawyers of Maniacs" by the SPEKTR editorial team (2024)
- TV series "Fear over the Neva" (2023)

== See also ==
- Alexei Ivanov (serial killer)
- List of Russian serial killers
- List of serial killers by number of victims

== In media and culture ==
- Three documentaries have been made on the case: "The Double Life of Sergeant Major Chuplinsky", "Maniac in uniform" and "Siberian Monster"
