= Five Lakes =

Five Lakes may refer to:

- Five Lakes (China)
- Fuji Five Lakes, Japan
- Five Lakes, Michigan, United States
- Five Lakes is a group of lakes in Novosibirsk and Omsk Oblasts, Russia
- Fünfseenland, or Five Lakes Country, Germany
- Great Lakes, five lakes between Canada and United States
