= Coat of arms of Novosibirsk =

Official flag of Novosibirsk, Russia

- Adopted: 2004
- Supporters: Black sables
- Compartment: Bow, two arrows, ribbon
- Other elements: Trans Siberian Railway
- Designer: V. N. Uzbek
- Register number 1752

The coat of arms of Novosibirsk is the official heraldic arms of the city of Novosibirsk in Novosibirsk oblast in Russia. The coat of arms of the city were approved by the decision of the City Council of Novosibirsk from June 23, 2004 No. 410 "On the emblem and flag of the city of Novosibirsk."

The coat of arms is registered under the State Heraldic Register of the Russian Federation (No.1752).

== Description ==
The coat of arms of the city is a heraldic shield. The arms shares many elements with the coat of arms of Novosibirsk Oblast.

Novosibirsk city arms

The shield is divided per bend sinister green and silver overlaid with a wavy blue bend sinister. A narrow fess divided per pale silver and black runs through the centre, joined by a gold semi circle. The shield is topped with a gold mural crown, with five three-pointed teeth. The shield is supported by two rampant sables proper, with red tongues.

Flag of Novosibirsk

The shield sits atop a compartment consisting of a wavy perforated ribbon in the colours of the flag of Novosibirsk, and a red and black bow with two arrows.

=== Symbolism ===
The white and green has a long tradition in Siberian heraldry. The green represents health, as well as Siberia's natural resources, whilst the white represents purity, and the snow that often covers the landscape. The blue wavy bend sinister is for the River Ob, and the bridge for the Trans-Siberian Railway is also symbolically represented.

The number of teeth atop the mural crown show the city's status as a regional capital. The sables are references to the historic heraldry of the Siberian region of Russia.

== History ==
=== Soviet era (1970) ===
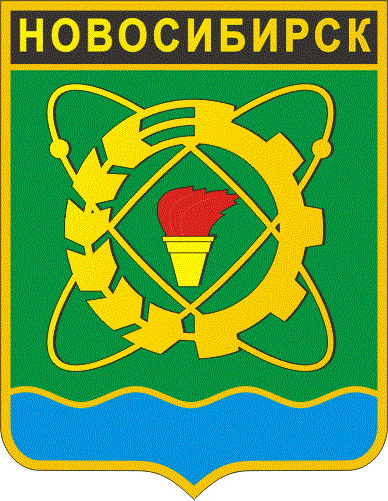
Coat of arms of Novosibirsk (1970)

On the 23rd of December 1970 the city council adopted its first official coat of arms, designed by Vladimir Nikolaevich Uzbek.

The Soviet coat of arms features a rectangular shield, green with a blue wavy blue base-bar. The shield features text at the top reading, 'НОВОСИБИРСК' (Novosibirsk). The shield also features a charge in the centre depicting a golden torch with a red flame. Encircling the torch is a gear, that transitions into an ear of wheat. Orbiting the whole charge, are two electrons.

The torch is symbolic of the Communist Party. The gear, wheat and electrons highlight Novosibirsk's status as a city of technology, agriculture and science.
