= Flag of Novosibirsk Oblast =

Novosibirsk Oblast
- Proportion: 2:3
- Adopted: July 10, 2003

The Flag of Novosibirsk Oblast (Russian: Флаг Новосибирской области, romanized: Flag Novosibirskoj oblasti) is the official symbol of Novosibirsk Oblast, Russia.

== Description ==
The flag of the Novosibirsk Region is a rectangular panel which shows five different-sized stripes of red, white, blue, white, and green (left-to-right).

Between the red and green stripes, two black sable are depicted holding a yellow loaf of korovai with a salt shaker. Underneath, the white and blue stripes are crossed by a horizontal narrow belt which is colored black on the white and white on the blue.

The ratio of the width of the stripes to the length of the flag is 5: 3: 2: 3: 5, respectively. The ratio of the width of the flag to the length is 2: 3. The ratio of the width of the belt to the width of the flag is 1:80.

On the initial sketch drawn by the Novosibirsk artist Grigory Kuzhelev, a blue stripe was used in place of the red stripe. Blue was to symbolize the Ob River; white, purity of thoughts; and green, natural wealth. The red bar was added at the insistence of the Communist Party faction of the Regional Council.

== Symbolism ==
The color and symbolic meaning of the flag are reflective of the Siberian region and the historical heraldry of Novosibirsk, of which white, green, red and blue are the main colors.

White symbolizes purity, devotion, and faith, as well as the color of the harsh Siberian winter.

Green symbolizes hope, abundance, rebirth, and vitality, personifying the natural diversity and beauty of the fertile land of Novosibirsk.

Red symbolizes courage and the memory of the heroism of the Novosibirsk people in defending their homeland.

Blue symbolizes the Ob River and the numerous lakes and rivers occupying almost a third of the region.

In the center of the flag is the emblem of the region, two black sables depicted holding a yellow loaf of korovai with a salt shaker.

== Other flags ==
=== Administrative divisions ===
Flag	Date	Use	description
	?–Present	Flag of Novosibirsk city	
	2008–Present	Flag of Barabinsk	
	?–2008	Flag of Barabinsk	
	?–Present	Flag of Berdsk	
	?–Present	Flag of Iskitim	
	2004–Present	Flag of Kuybyshev	
	?–2004	Flag of Kuybyshev	
	?–Present	Flag of Ob	
	?–Present	Flag of Tatarsk	
	?–Present	Flag of Bagansky District	
	?–Present	Flag of Barabinsky District	
	?–Present	Flag of Bolotninsky District	
	?–Present	Flag of Vengerovsky District	
	?–Present	Flag of Dovolensky District	
	2006–Present	Flag of Zdvinsky District	
	?–2006	Flag of Zdvinsky District	
	?–Present	Flag of Iskitimsky District	
	?–?	Flag of Iskitimsky District	
	?–Present	Flag of Karasuksky District	
	?–Present	Flag of Kargatsky District	
	?–Present	Flag of Kolyvansky District	
	2007–Present	Flag of Kochenyovsky District	
	?–2007	Flag of Kochenyovsky District	
	?–Present	Flag of Krasnozyorsky District	
	?–Present	Flag of Kuybyshevsky District	
	?–Present	Flag of Kupinsky District	
	?–Present	Flag of Kyshtovsky District	
	?–Present	Flag of Maslyaninsky District	
	?–Present	Flag of Moshkovsky District	
	?–Present	Flag of Novosibirsky District	
	2009–Present	Flag of Koltsovo	
	2008–2009	Flag of Koltsovo	
	?–2008	Flag of Koltsovo	
	?–Present	Flag of Ordynsky District	
	2006–Present	Flag of Severny District	
	?–2006	Flag of Severny District	
	?–Present	Flag of Suzunsky District	
	?–Present	Flag of Tatarsky District	
	?–Present	Flag of Toguchinsky District	
	?–Present	Flag of Ubinsky District	
	?–Present	Flag of Ust-Tarksky District	
	?–Present	Flag of Chanovsky District	
	?–Present	Flag of Cherepanovsky District	
	?–Present	Flag of Chistoozyorny District	
	?–Present	Flag of Chulymsky District	

=== Settlements ===
Flag	Date	Use	description
	?–Present	Flag of Bagan	
	?–Present	Flag of Bolotnoye	
	?–present	Flag of Karasuk	
	?–Present	Flag of Kochenyovo	
	?–Present	Flag of Zdvinsk	
	?–Present	Flag of Kupino	
	?–Present	Flag of Kyshtovka	
	?–Present	Flag of Moshkovo	
	?–Present	Flag of Ordynskoye	
	?–Present	Flag of Severnoye	
	?–Present	Flag of Suzun	
	?–Present	Flag of Toguchin	
