= Five Lakes (West Siberia) =

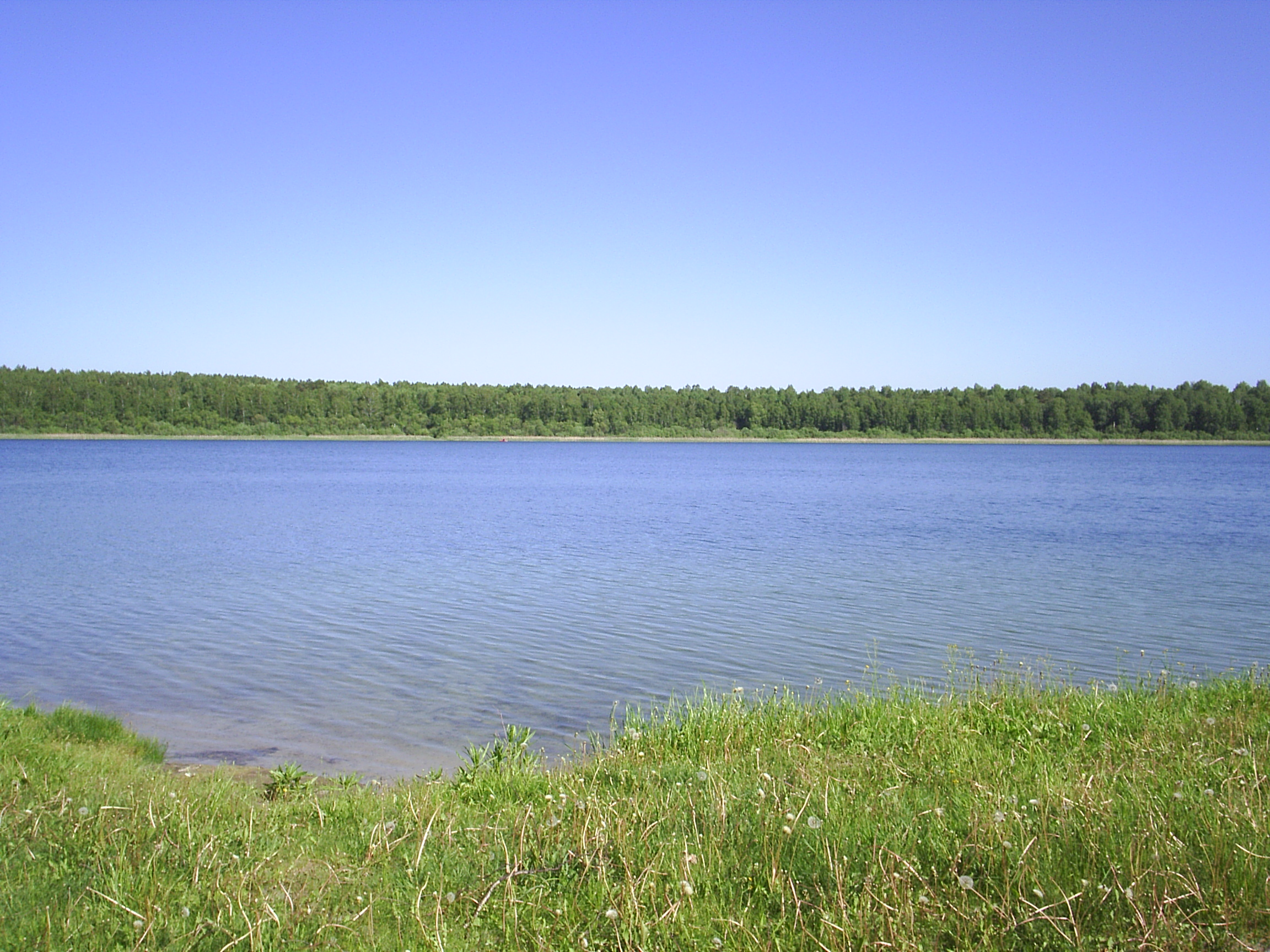
- Lake Danilino

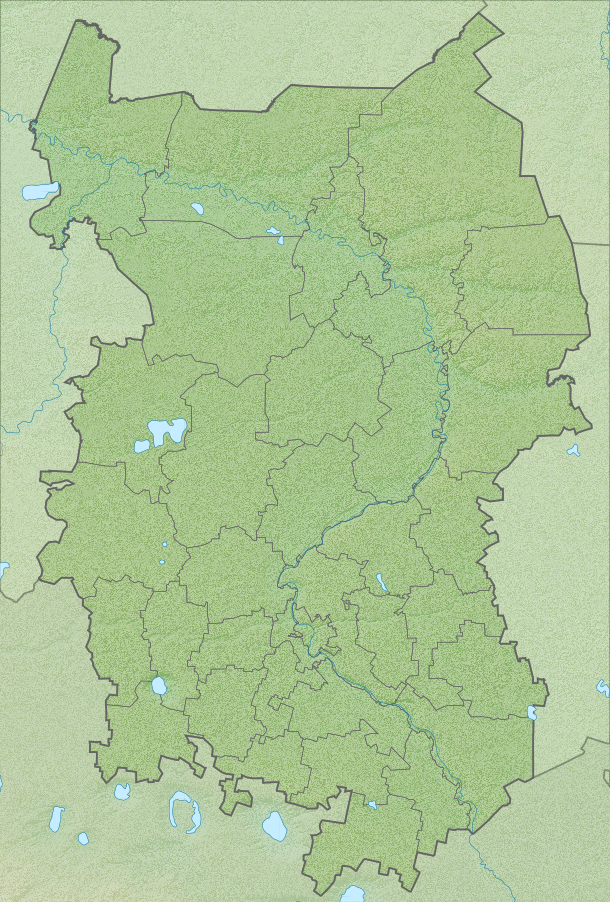
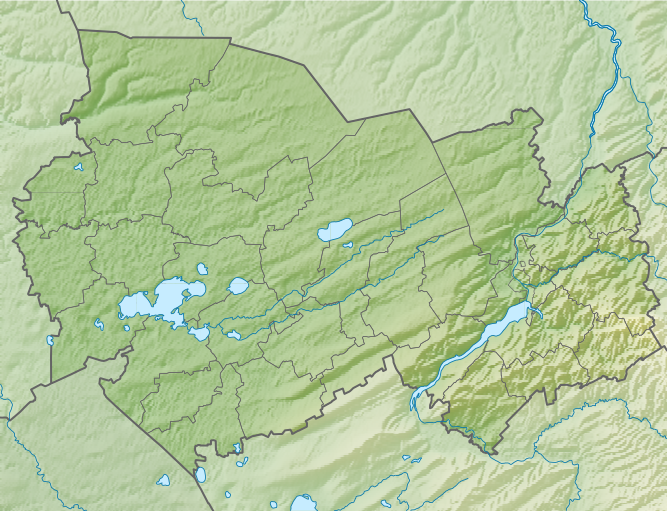
- Location within Omsk Oblast Location within Novosibirsk Oblast Location within Russia
- Location: Novosibirsk Oblast, Omsk Oblast, Russia
- Coordinates: 56°26′N 75°50′E

Five Lakes (Russian: Пять озёр) is a group of lakes located in Muromtsevsky District of Omsk Oblast and Kyshtovsky District of Novosibirsk Oblast, Russia.

== Lakes ==
- Lake Danilino is a lake in Kyshtovsky District. The nearest settlement: Kurganka of Muromtsevsky District (1 km).
- Lake Lenevo (Lenyovo, Linyovo)
- Lake Schchuchye
- Lake Shaitan
- Lake Urmannoe is located east of Lake Danilino, in Kyshtovsky District. Some media believe that Lake Urmannoe and Lake Shaitan are the same body of water.
