= Alexei Ivanov (serial killer) =

Russian serial killer

- Born: Alexei Yevgenyevich Ivanov; 4 March 1976 (age 50); Novosibirsk, Novosibirsk Oblast, RSFSR
- Other names: "The Taxi Driver Maniac" "The Cleaner"
- Conviction: Murder x4
- Penalty: Life imprisonment

Details
- Victims: 4
- Span of crimes: May – October 2015
- Country: Russia
- State: Novosibirsk
- Date apprehended: October 2015

Alexei Yevgenyevich Ivanov (Russian: Алексей Евгеньевич Иванов; born 4 March 1976), known as The Taxi Driver Maniac (Russian: Маньяк-таксист), is a Russian serial killer who killed four prostitutes in Novosibirsk between May and October 2015, dismembering and burning the victims' bodies post-mortem. A one-time suspect in the "Novosibirsk Maniac" case (for which former policeman Yevgeny Chuplinsky would later be convicted), he was convicted of his killings and sentenced to life imprisonment.

== Early life ==
Little is known about Ivanov's life and upbringing. A native of Novosibirsk born in 1976, he had a small criminal record with arrests for burglary, but was considered an ordinary, married man who worked as a taxi driver in the local area. Around May 2015, he temporarily moved to Moscow for work purposes, and upon his return, a friend informed him that his wife had been cheating on him. Enraged by his wife's infidelity, Ivanov sought to punish those whom he deemed as "harlots", beginning a killing spree that would last several months and frighten the local population.

== Murders ==
Ivanov's modus operandi was to pick up certain women from the Moshkovsky and Kalininsky City districts of Novosibirsk, with his victims being prostitutes with drug or alcohol dependencies and inclinations for promiscuous sex. He drove the victims to isolated areas, where he would rape and kill them (first by strangulation, but then he decided to beat them to death with a stick). After the death, he would then mutilate the body, cutting off the genitalia and the hands, before disposing of the corpse in the nearby forest. In one instance, he later returned to the burial site so he could burn the body. His victims were the following:

- In May 2015, he picked up a 40-year-old woman, whom he beat and strangled with his trousers' belt. He then drove to the forest in the outskirts of Novosibirsk, where he covered the corpse with tree branches. The woman's disappearance was not reported to police, as she recently had had an argument with her family, who believed that she had moved away.
- Not long after, he picked up another woman (age reported to be 30–31), whom he stabbed in the back and then beat to death in his taxi. After the victim stopped showing signs of life, he drove to the forest, where he dumped the corpse and covered it with tree branches. Ivanov would later return to the crime scene, dousing the body with gasoline and lighting it on fire. Two months after the crime, a mushroom picker would discover the grisly scene, with the unfortunate woman's belongings and mobile phone scattered about the area.
- In July, he killed his third victim, a 35-year-old woman whom he viciously beat using both his arms and legs, even hitting her head on a tree several times. Like with the previous victims, he dumped the body in the forest and covered it with tree branches. Her disappearance was also not reported to the police, as her husband, with whom she had quarrelled, believed that she had simply moved away to start a new life.
- The final victim was 28-year-old saleswoman Galina Litvinenko, who disappeared on October 16 from the Kalininsky city district. On that night, she had been to a nightclub with a friend, and after leaving the establishment, she called for a taxi, never to be seen again. Ivanov drove her to the forest, near the highway's northern pass, where he brutally beat her to death, dismembering her remains and hiding them with tree branches afterwards.

== Arrest, trial and imprisonment ==
A few days after Litvinenko's disappearance, Ivanov was detained as a suspect. Initially, he admitted to driving her on that night but claimed that his taxi had broken down along the Pashinsky Crossing. Impatient, Litvinenko then told him she would travel the rest of the way on foot, disappearing into the night. His story wasn't believed by investigators, who asked him to provide a saliva sample. Two weeks after Litvinenko's disappearance, her family and numerous volunteers were searching around Novosibirsk when they stumbled upon dismembered human remains out in the woods. Although they were unrecognizable at first glance, they were later determined to be Litvinenko's, and the clothes were examined for any traces left by the offender. Much to the authorities' delight, Ivanov's DNA matched that found on the victim's clothing, and when confronted with the evidence, realising there was no way out, he confessed to the murder. To their shock, however, he named an additional three victims killed over the past several months, showing the burial sites for each during the investigative experiments. Thanks to his confessions, he exonerated another man who was suspected and arrested for one of the killings.

When questioned about the reasons for the murders, Ivanov cited his wife's betrayal as his breaking point, for which he developed a hatred towards women and a desire to "keep the city's moral purity." Due to the similarities of his killings and the then-unsolved murders of 17 prostitutes in the city, dating back to 1998, Ivanov was briefly considered a prime suspect but later ruled out. In subsequent psychiatric evaluations, Ivanov was diagnosed as suffering from sexual sadism disorder, but was found competent to stand trial. During the proceedings, Ivanov claimed that he had wanted to decapitate one of the victims' heads and send it anonymously to his wife, with a threatening letter saying "You're next.", and claimed that if he weren't stopped, he would continue on killing. For his crimes, he was convicted and sentenced to life imprisonment in a penal colony.

== See also ==
- List of Russian serial killers
