= Kirovsky District, Novosibirsk =

Kirovsky District
- District
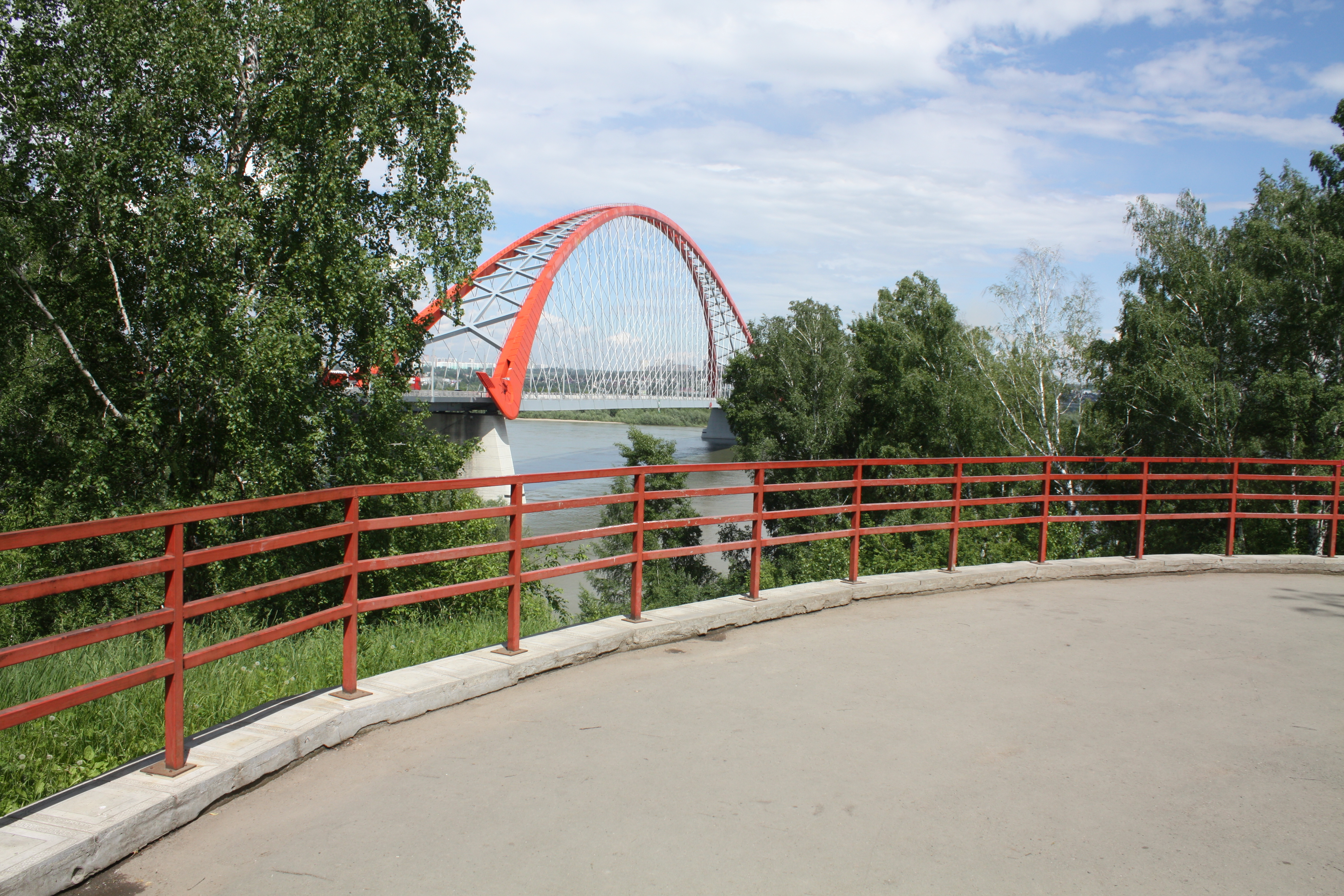
- Location of Kirovsky City District
- Coordinates: 54°57′45″N 82°54′44″E
- Country: Russia
- Federal subject: Novosibirsk

Area
  - Total: 50.7 km^{2} (19.6 sq mi)

Kirovsky District (Russian: Кировский район) is an administrative district (raion), one of the 10 raions of Novosibirsk, Russia. It is located on the left bank of the Ob river. The area of the district is 50,7 km^{2} (19,6 sq mi). Population: 186,408 (2018 Census).

== History ==
Until 1930, the territory of the Kirovsky and Leninsky city districts was part of the Bugrinsky District of the Novosibirsk Okrug.

In 1930, it was decided to build large plants on the left bank of the Ob river and the railway line from the Tolmachyovo Station to the mines of Kuzbass.

October 20, 1930, Zaobsky District was formed.

December 2, 1934, Zaobsky District was renamed the Kirovsky District.

In December 1970, part of the Kirovsky City District became the Leninsky City District.

== Architecture ==
=== Soviet architecture ===
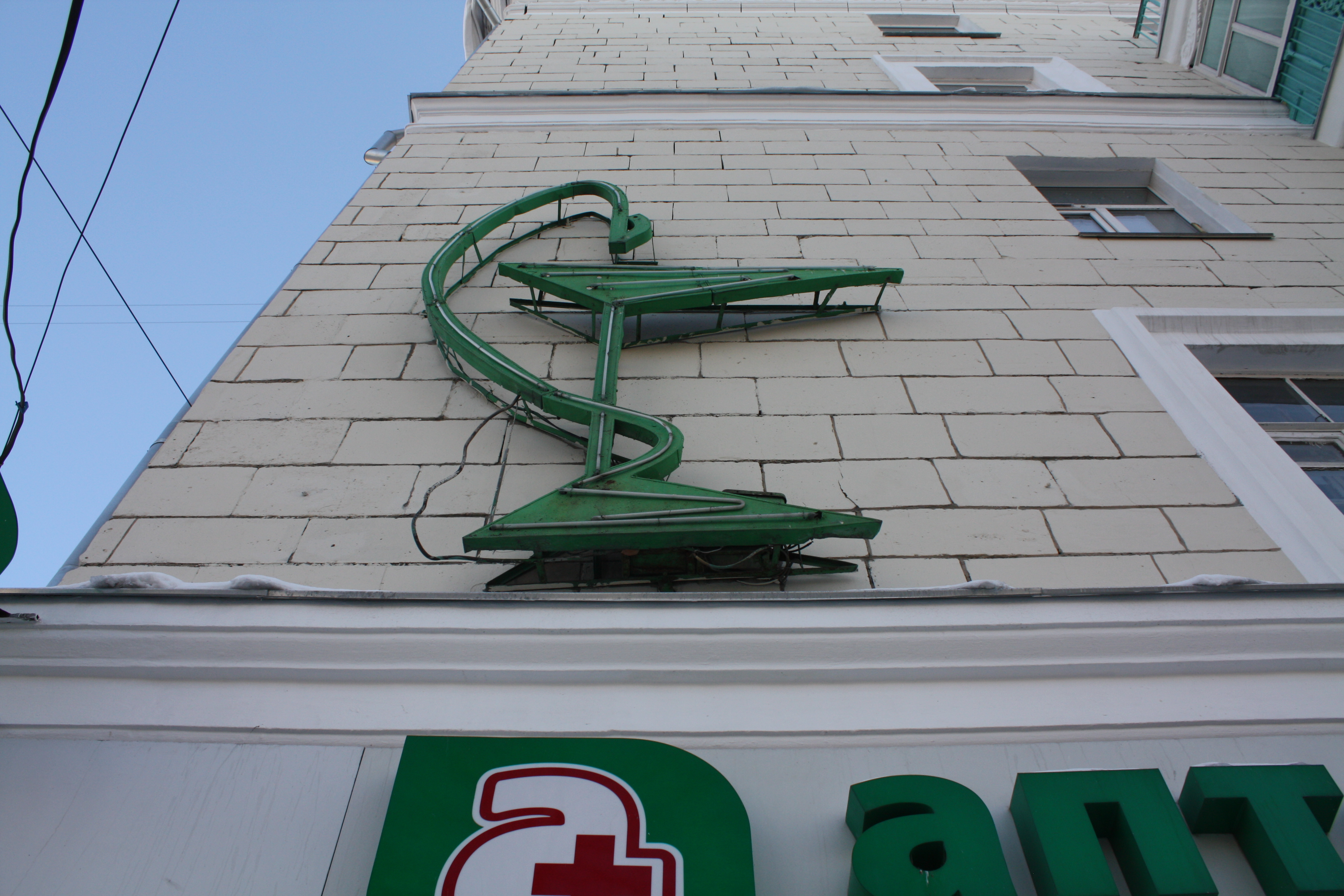

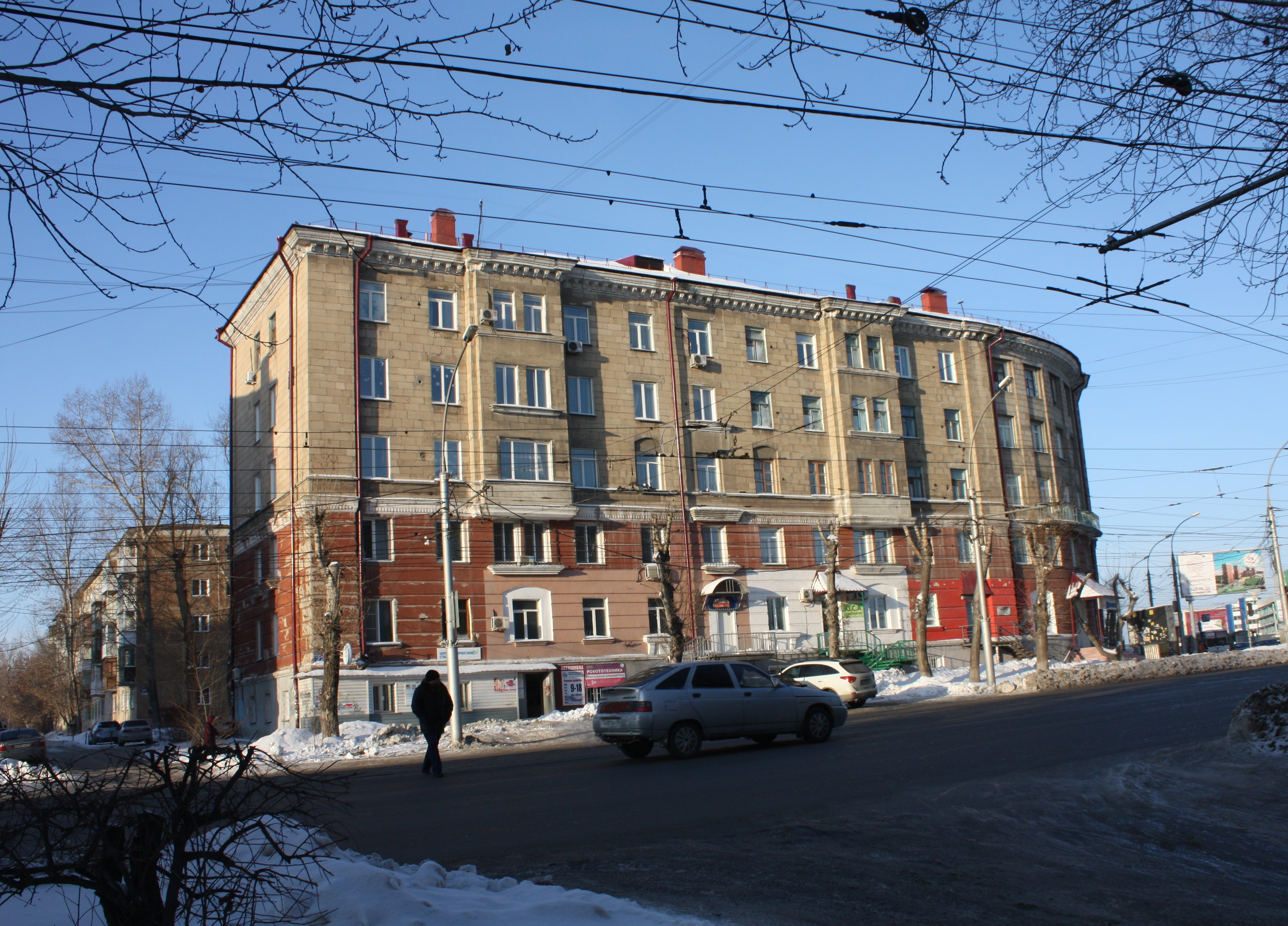

=== Post-Soviet architecture ===
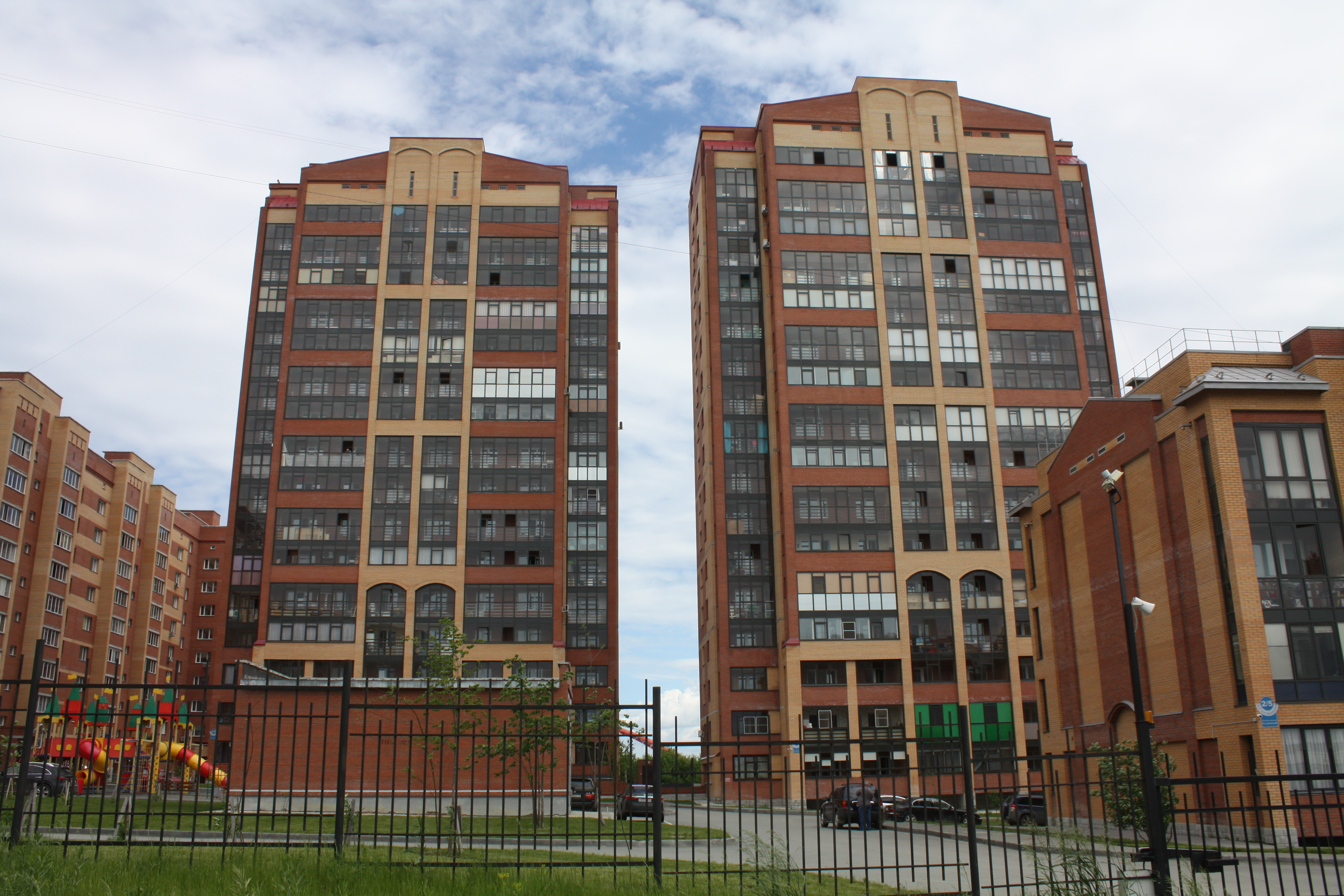
Gesstroyevskaya Street 2/2

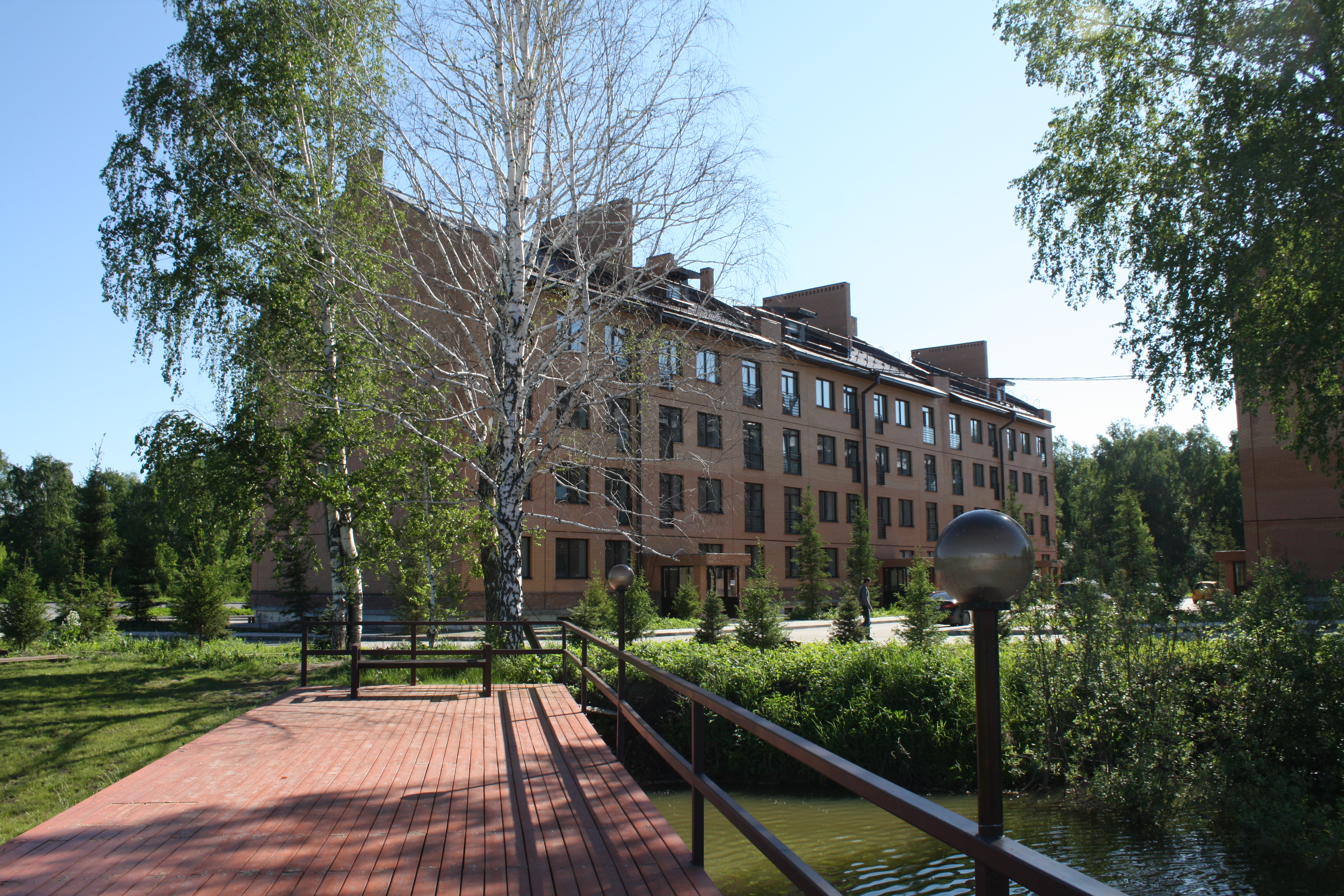
Beliye Rosy Housing Estate

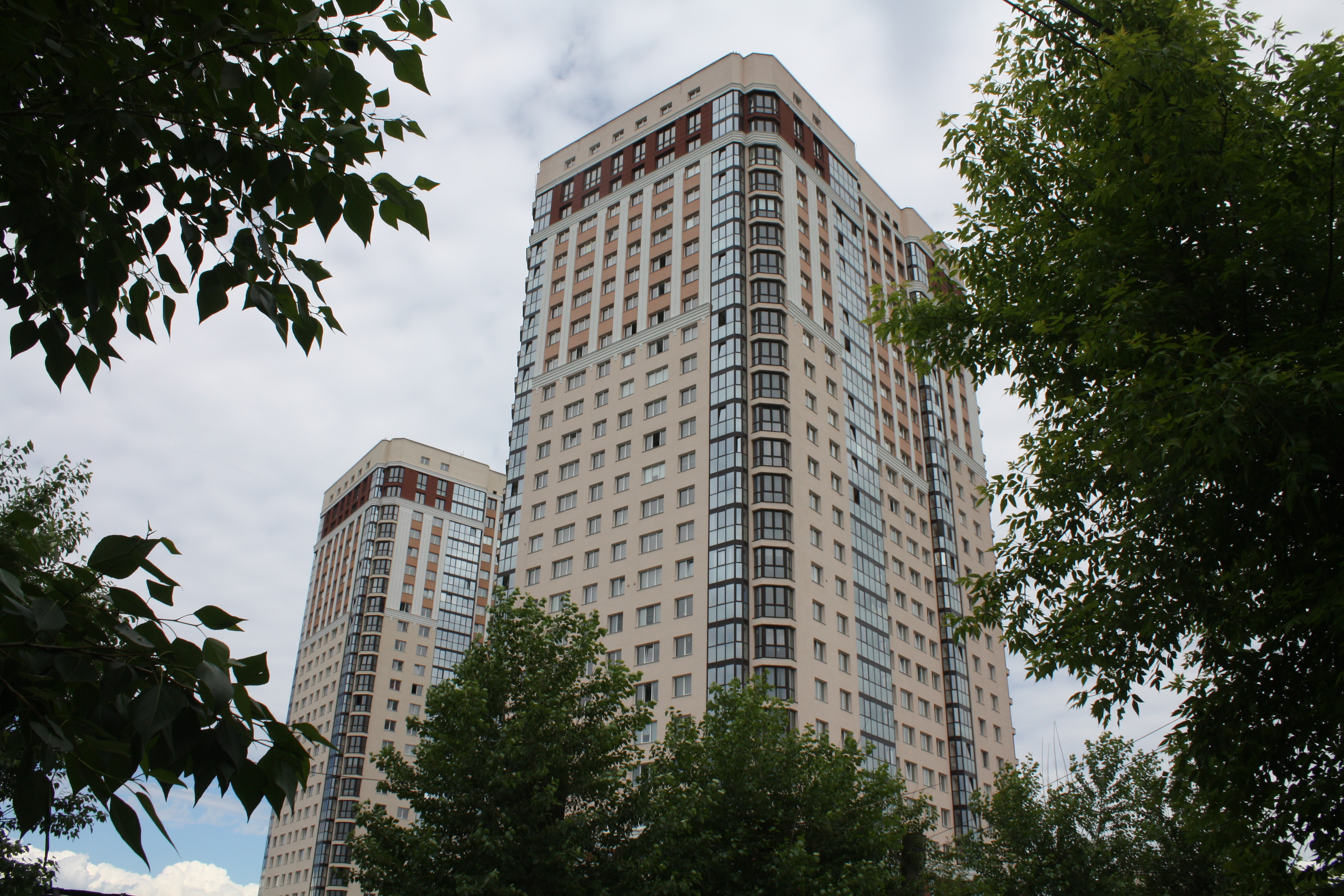
Six Star Housing Estate

== Parks ==
=== Bugrinskaya Roshcha ===
Bugrinskaya Roshcha is a park, established in 1971.

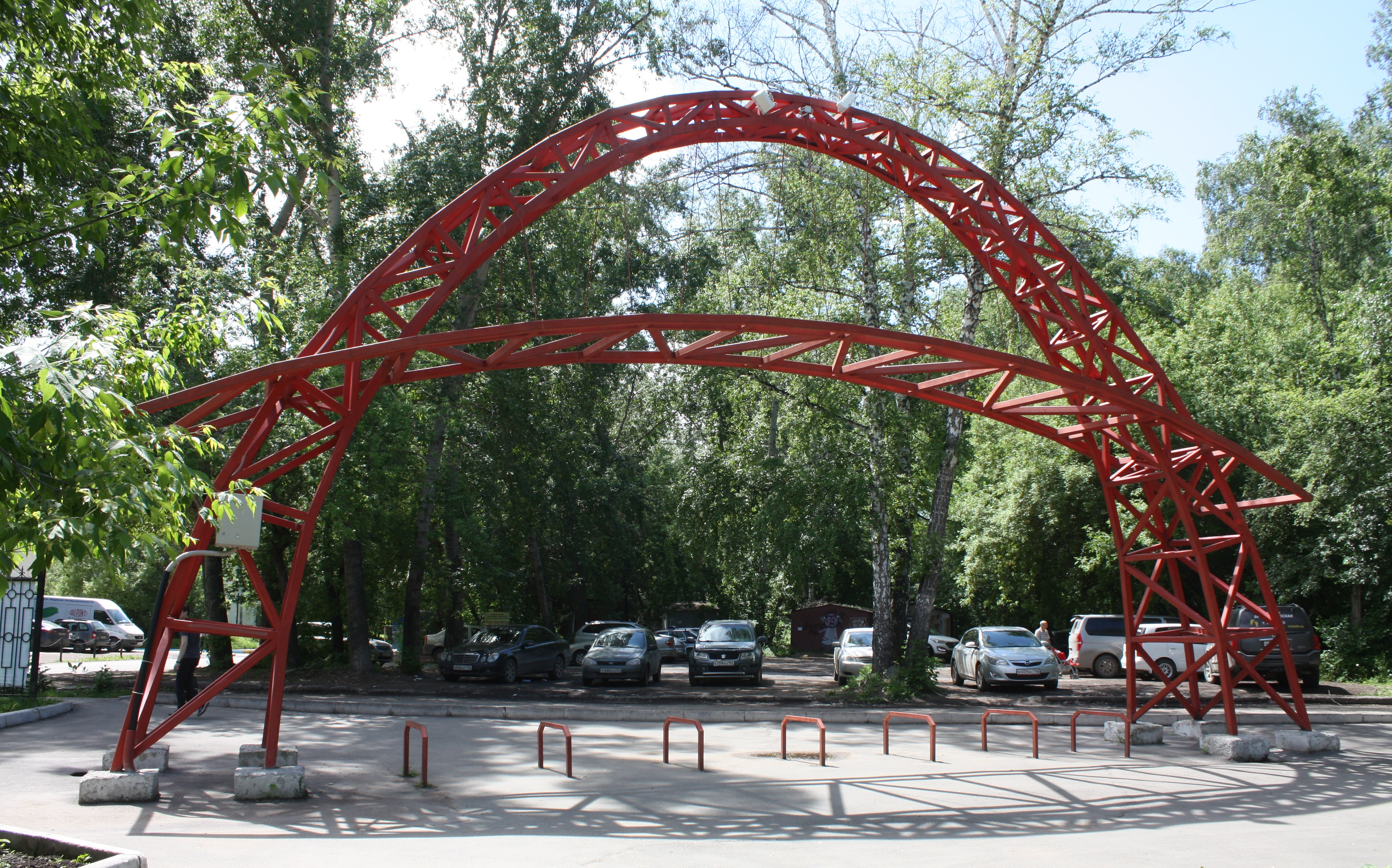

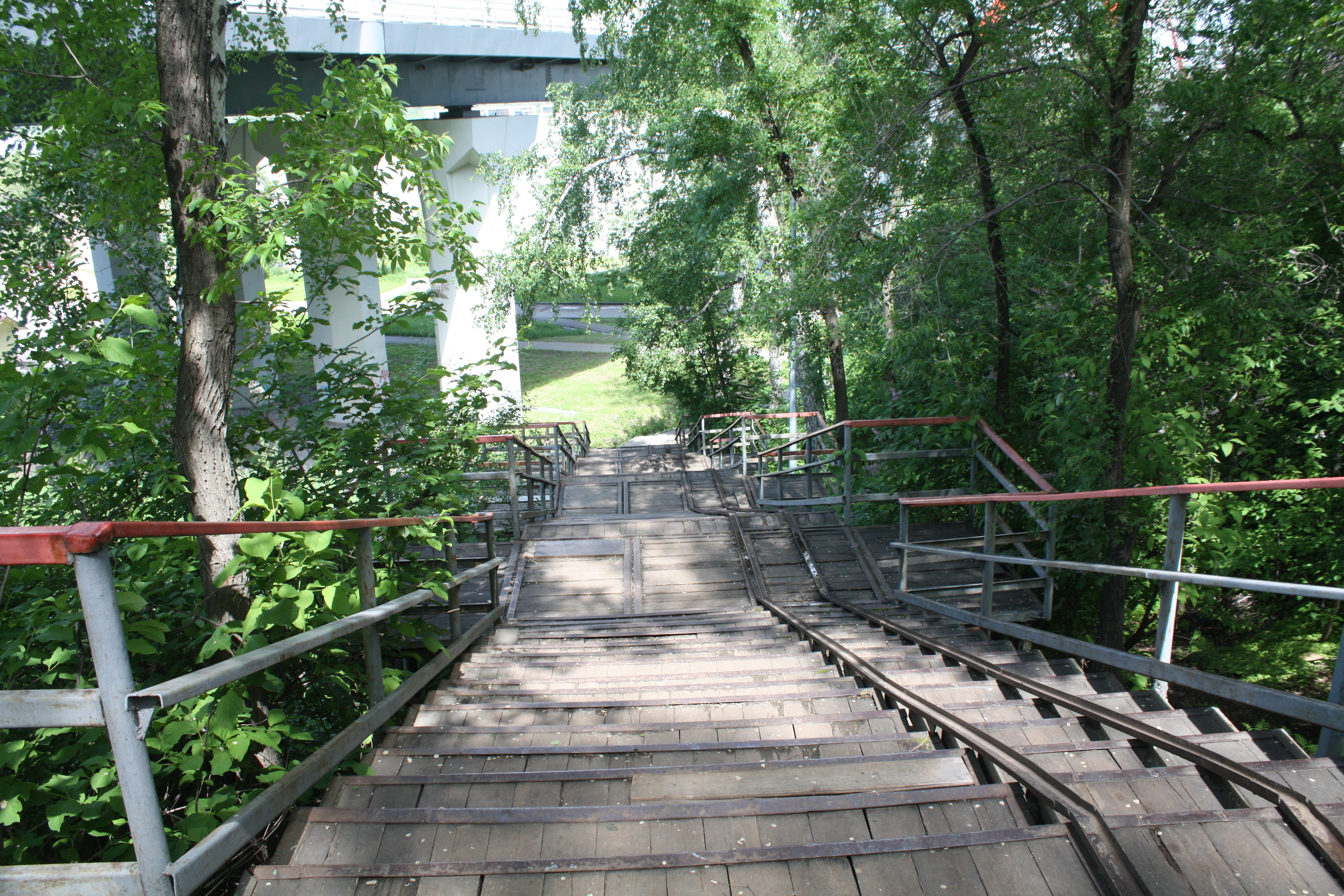

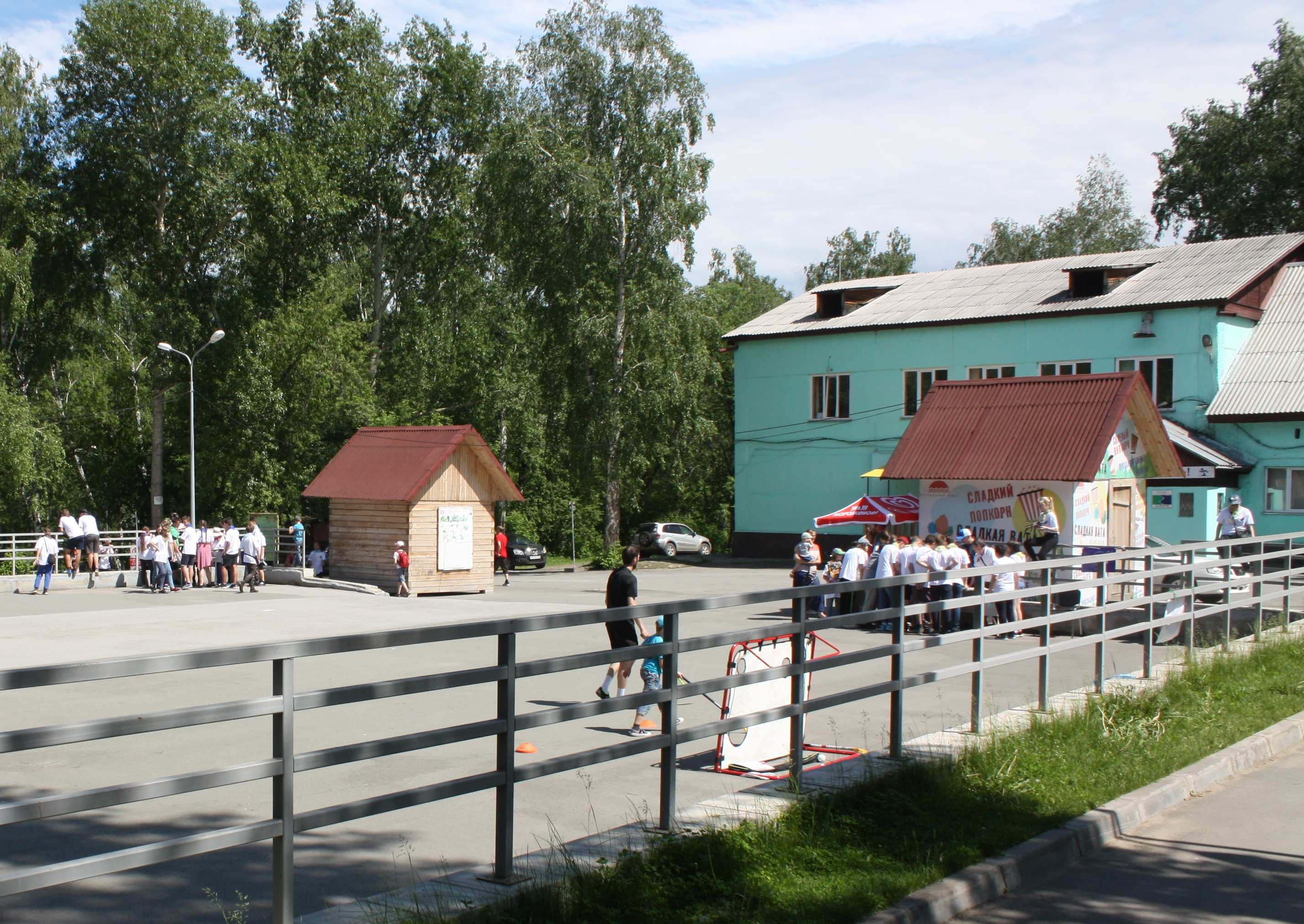

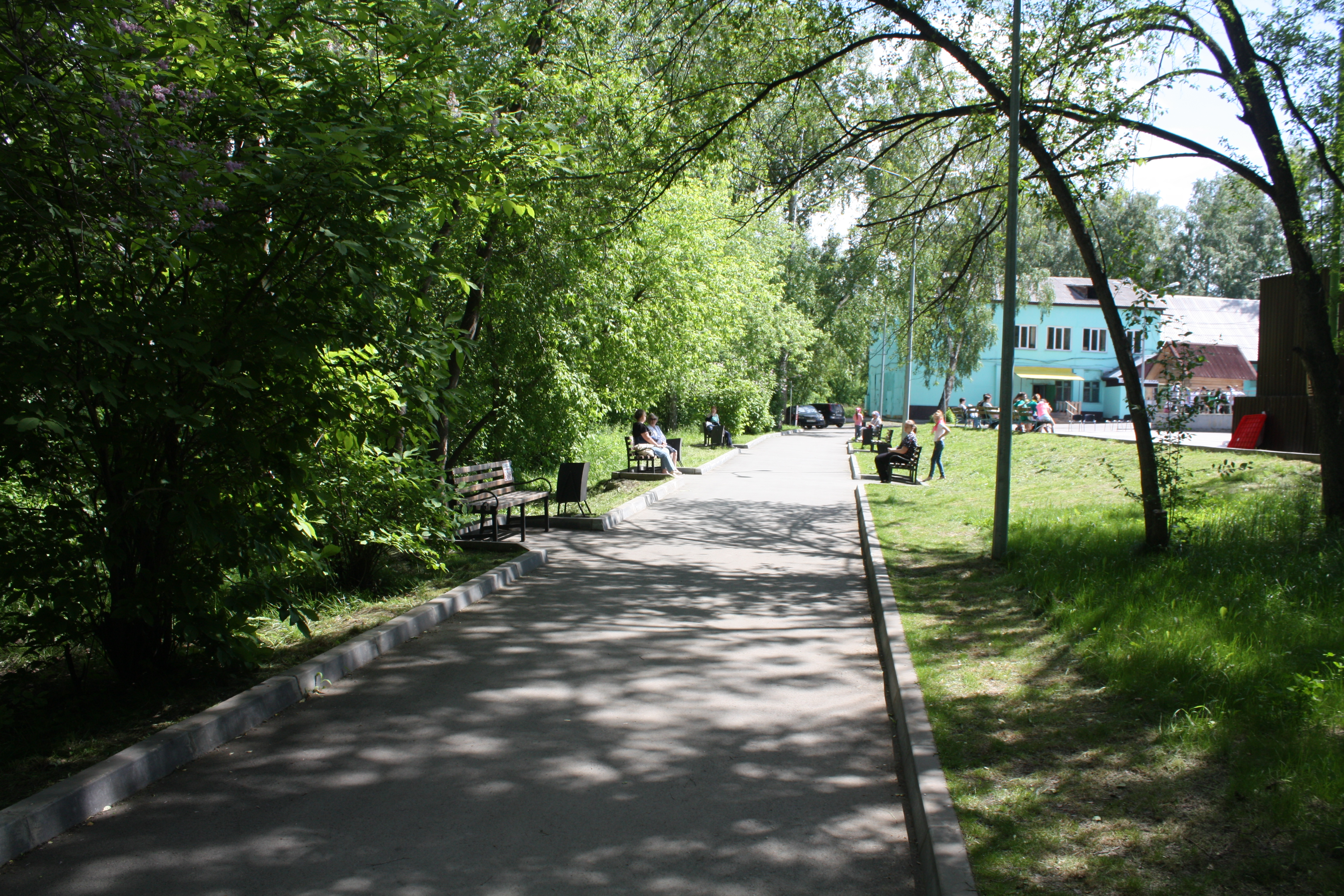

== Education ==
=== Educational institutions ===
- Department of Physical Education of the Novosibirsk State Pedagogical University
- Novosibirsk College of Printing and Information Technology
- Novosibirsk Industrial College

=== Libraries ===
- Astafyev Library
- Bulgakov Library
- Bunin Library
- Family Reading Library
- Grin Library
- Korolenko Library
- Magalif Family Reading Library
- Makarenko Central Rayon Library
- Nosov Library
- Novosibirsk Oblast Special Library for the Blind and Visually Impaired
- Paustovsky Library

== Culture ==
- House of Culture named after Yefremov
- Raduga (house of culture)

== Sports ==
- Iceberg Ice Complex
- Arena Discovery Tennis Club
- Flamingo Stadium
- Rosto Motodrome

=== Football ===
- Dribbling Football Section
- Junior Children's Football School
- Tsentr Children's Football Club

=== Shooting Sports ===
- Sports and shooting complex
- Volniye Strelki Bow-Crossbow Club

=== Combat Sport ===
- Azbuka Karate
- Dizel Boxing Club
- Children's Union of Karate
- Dinamex Karate Club
- Novosibirsk Aikido Center
- Novosibirsk City Federation of Kyokushinkai
- Sports section of sambo
- Taekwondo Sport Federation of Novosibirsk Oblast

== Religion ==
=== Christianity ===
- Orthodox Church of the Holy New Martyrs and Confessors of Russia
- Orthodox Chapel of the Icon of Vladimir Mother of God
- Mother Teresa's orphanage
- Caritas of Diocese of Transfiguration
- Christian Evangelical Church
- Novosibirsk Christian Church is a local religious organization of evangelical Christians
- Church of Jesus Christ of Latter-day Saints
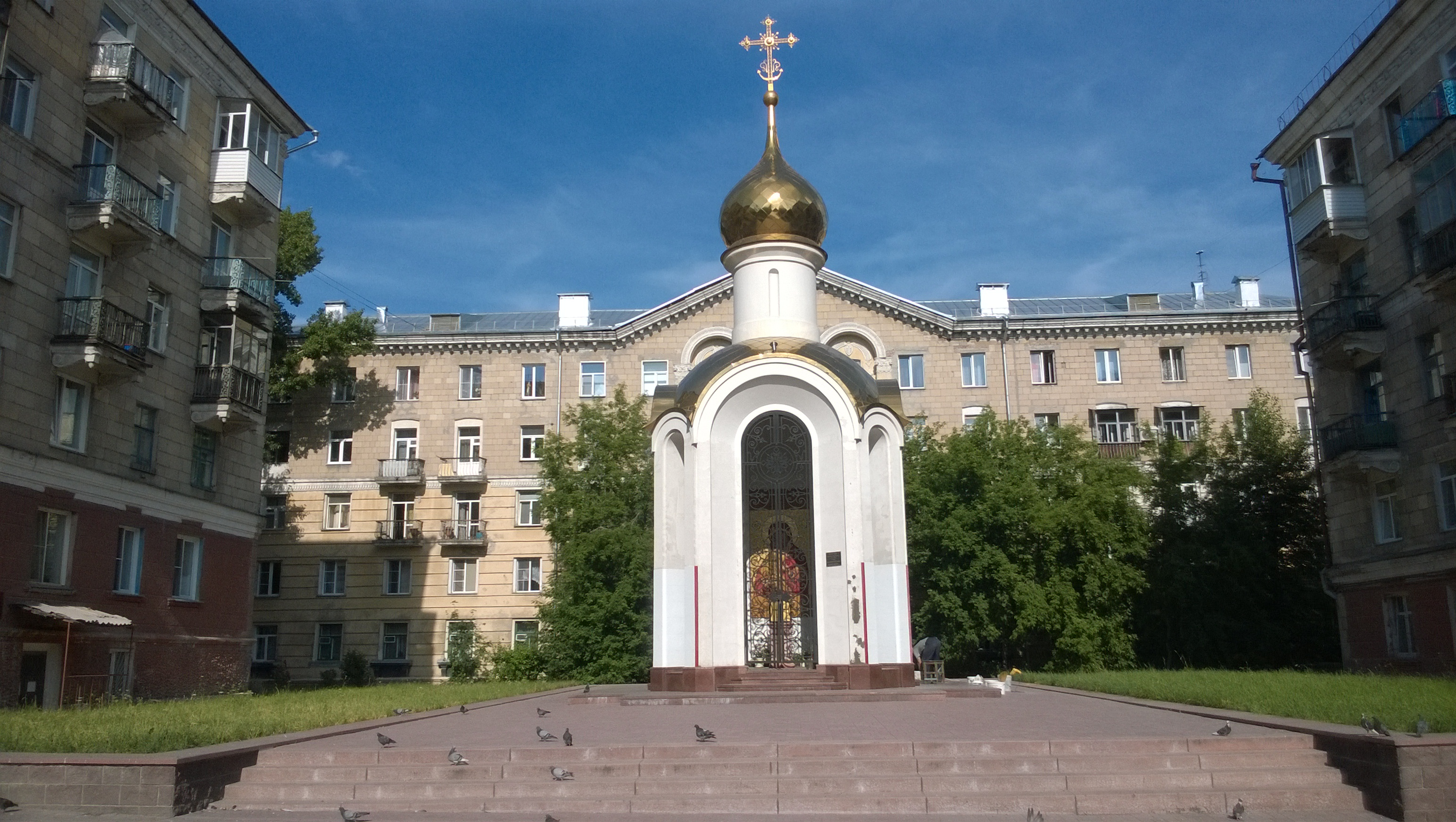
Orthodox Chapel of the Icon of Vladimir Mother of God

== Economy ==
=== Companies ===
- Novosibirsk Cold Storage is an ice cream manufacturer and food storage complex. It was founded in 1960.
- Novosibirsk Tin Plant
- NPO ELSIB
- Orion Confectionery
- Sibelektroprivod
- Sibelectroterm
- Siblitmash
- Tyazhstankohydropress

=== Retail ===
The district hosts shopping centres of international, interregional and local retail companies: MEGA Family Shopping Centre (IKEA, Auchan, Leroy Merlin), Metro Cash and Carry, Lenta, Posuda Centre and others.

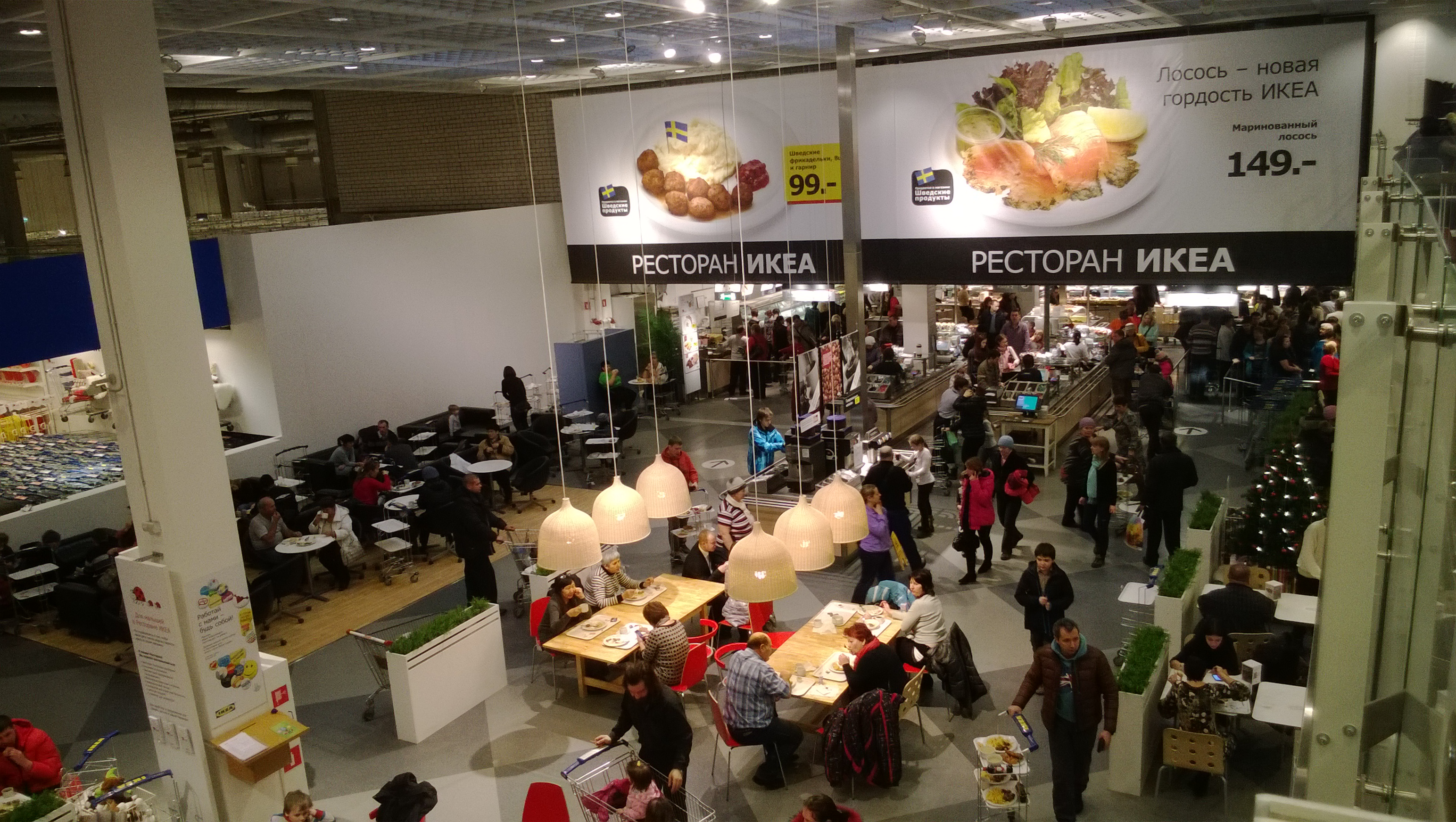

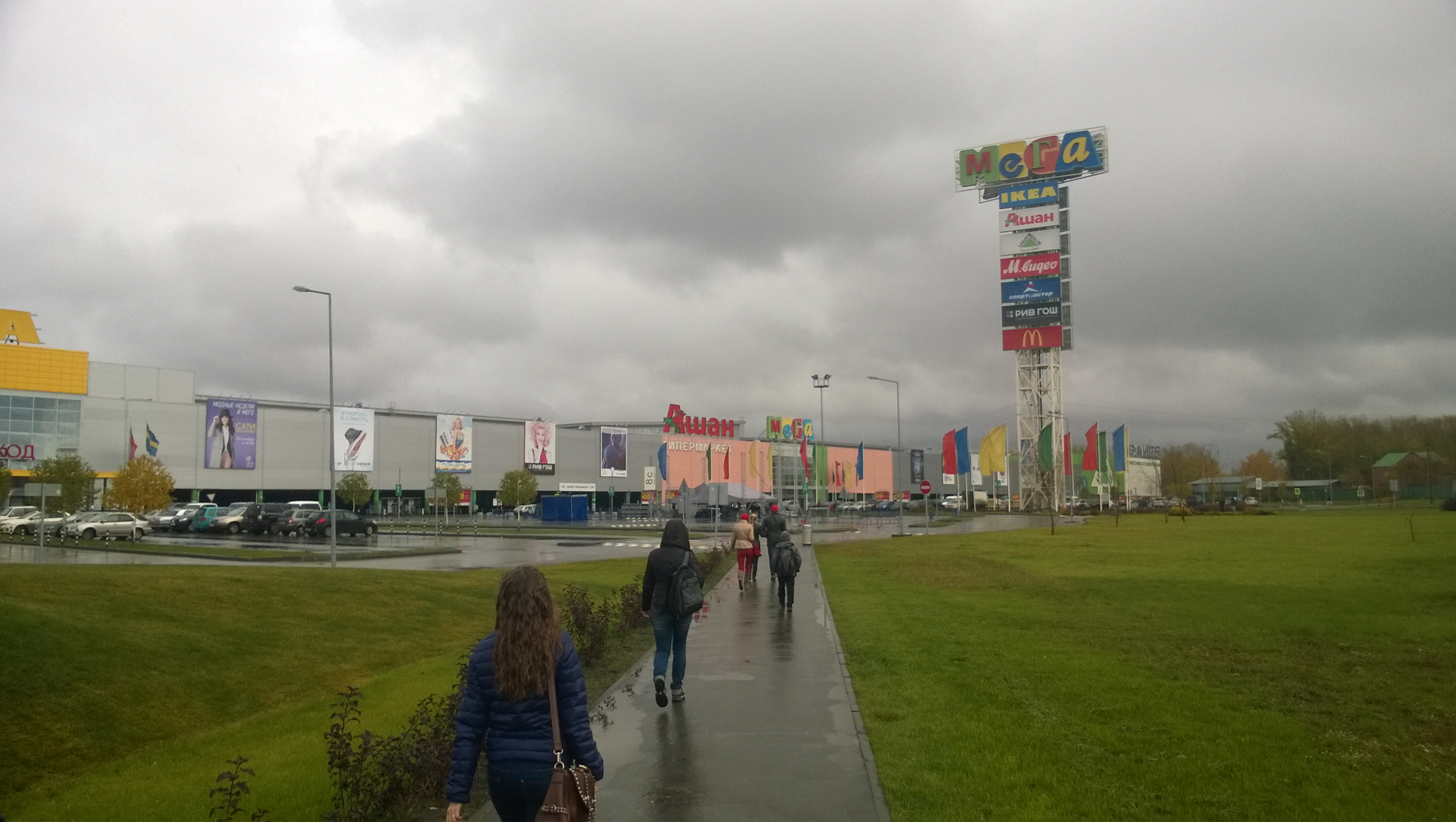

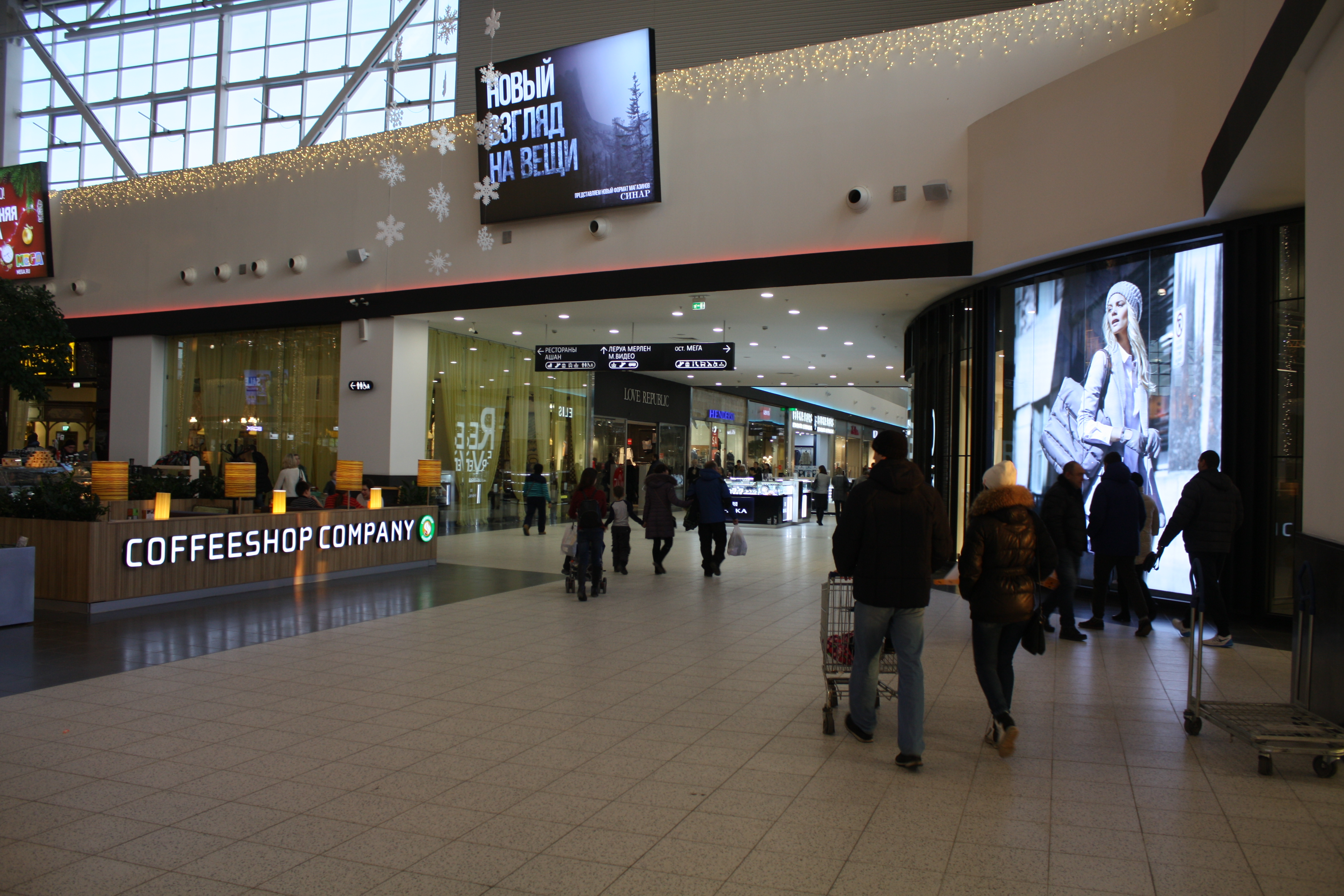

== Crime ==
In 2021, the district ranked first in the number of grievous bodily harm (43 cases) and robberies (81 cases). Also that year, 2051 thefts (third place after Leninsky and Oktyabrsky districts) and 28 motor vehicle theft (also third place after Leninsky and Oktyabrsky) were committed here.

== Transportation ==
=== Tram ===
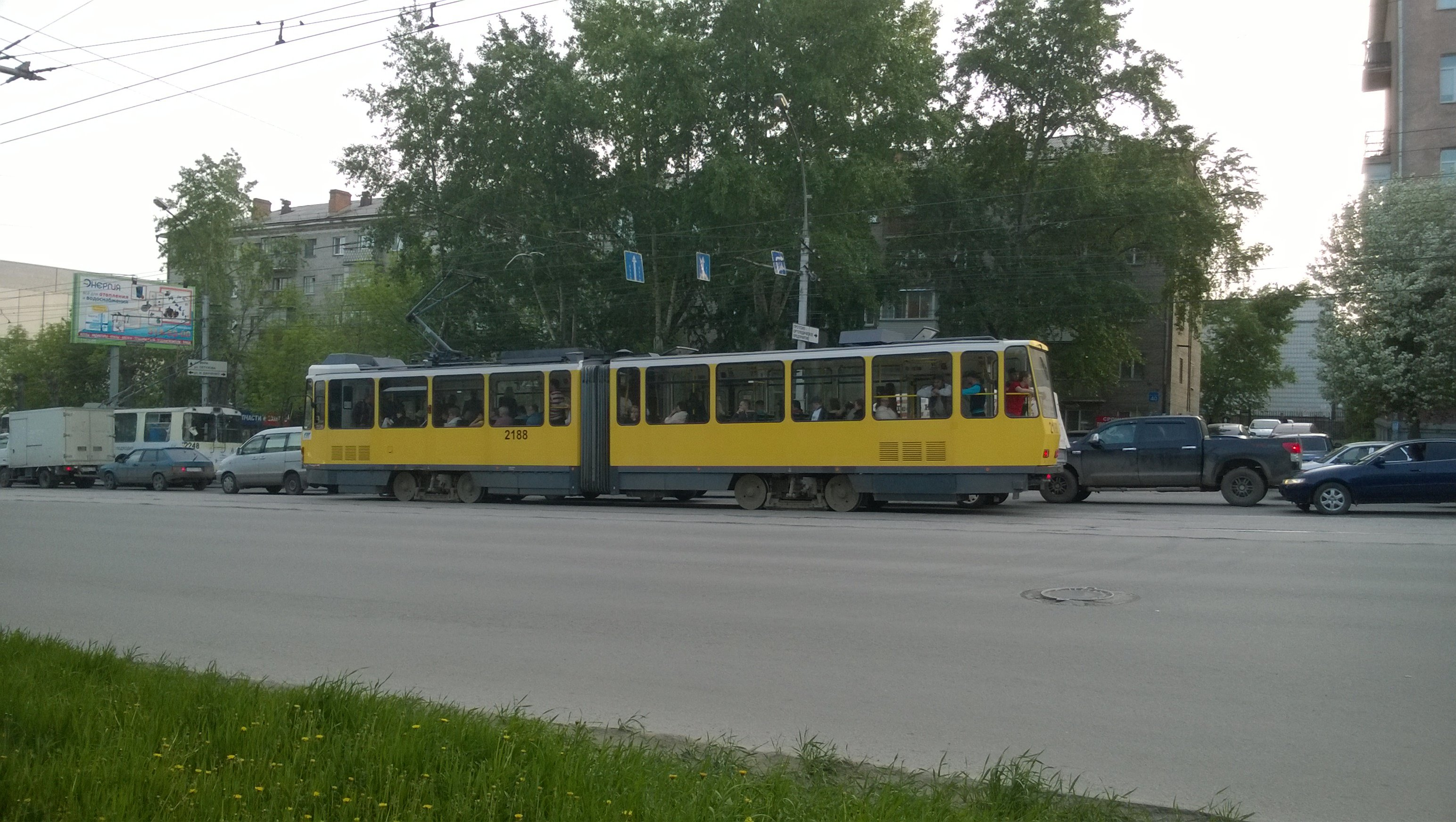

=== Railway ===
Chemskoy Station is located in the district.

=== Bridges ===
Bugrinsky Bridge is an automobile bridge over the Ob River, connecting the Kirovsky and Oktyabrsky districts.

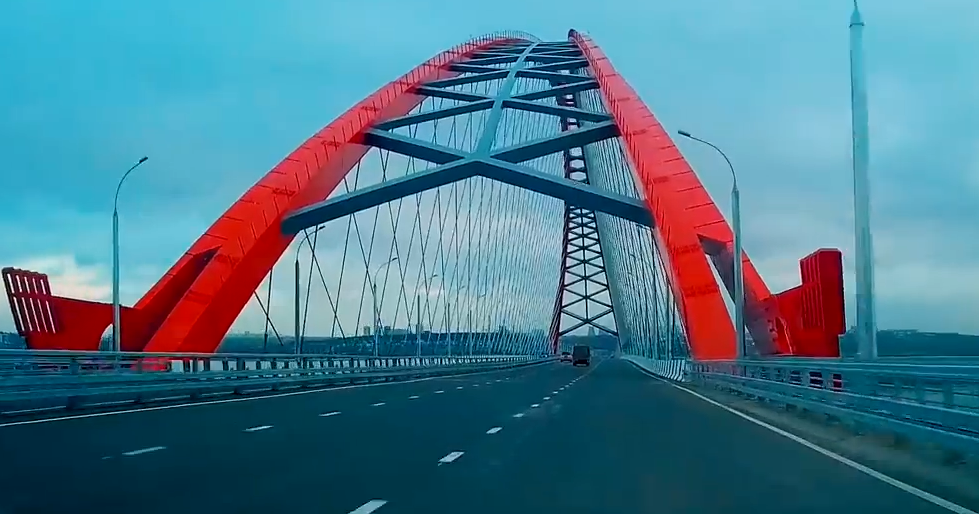
Bugrinsky Bridge

Komsomolsky Railway Bridge is a bridge over the Ob River built in 1930–1931.

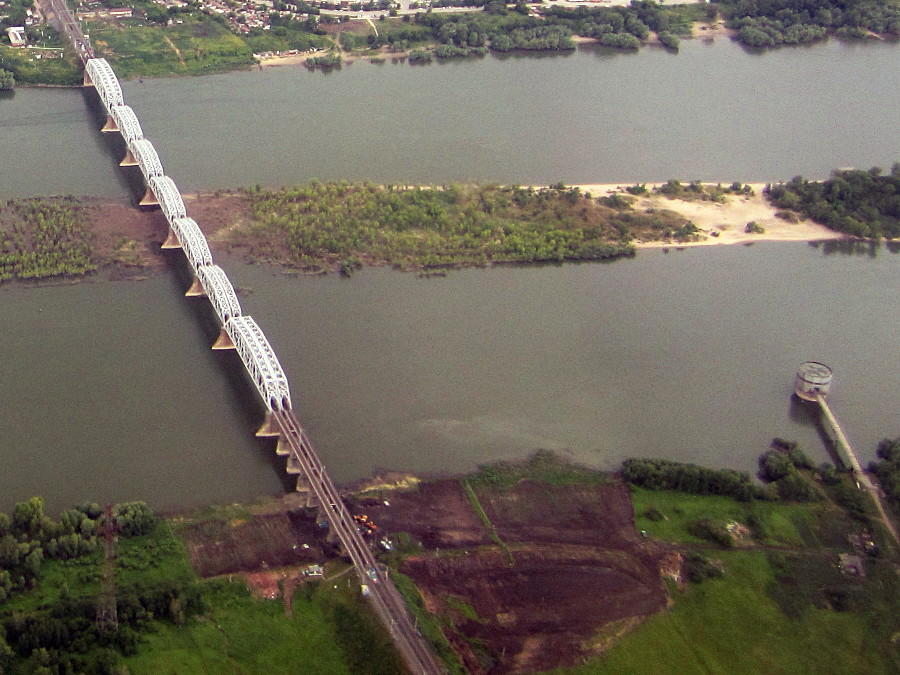
Komsomolsky Railway Bridge
