= Kyshtovka =

Rural locality in Novosibirsk Oblast, Russia

Coordinates: 56°33′34″N 76°37′33″E

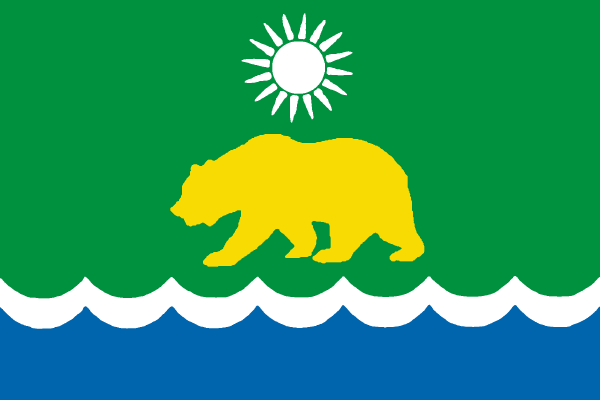
Flag of Kyshtovka

Kyshtovka (Russian: Кыштовка) is a rural locality (a selo) and the administrative center of Kyshtovsky District, Novosibirsk Oblast, Russia. Population: 5,282 (2010 census); 5,798 (2002 census); 6,000 (1989 Soviet census).
