= Coat of arms of Novosibirsk Oblast =

- Armiger: Novosibirsk Oblast
- Adopted: 29 May 2003

The coat of arms of Novosibirsk Oblast (Russian: Герб Новосибирской области, Gerb Novosibirskoy oblasti) is the principal official symbol of Novosibirsk Oblast, Russia.

Coat of arms of Tsardom of Siberia (part of the Russian Imperial Coat of Arms)

According to the law, adopted by the Oblast legislature in 2003, "The coat of arms of the Novosibirsk Region is a heraldic shield, in the silver (white) field of which there is an azure (blue) pillar and on top of it are two black sables facing each other with scarlet (red) tongues, silver (white) inner sides of the ears, noses, with throats and claws, holding with their front paws a golden loaf with a salt shaker, accompanied at the tip by a black filiform belt, changing the color of the column to silver (white)." The armorial composition bears explicit reference to the coat of arms of Tsardom (Governorate) of Siberia which used to be a part of the Coat of arms of the Russian Empire. The Imperial design was probably derived from the earlier symbol of the Tatars of Siberia and featured two sables supporting a crown, a bow and two arrows. Now the sables support korovai and salt-cellar, which is traditional Russian symbols of hospitality. The blue pale at the modern shield is meant to symbolize the great Ob River and the black barrulet is meant to symbolize the Trans-Siberian Railway, which runs through the whole territory of Novosibirsk Oblast in an east-west direction.
