= Tyazhstankohydropress =

- Founded: 1943
- Headquarters: Novosibirsk, Russia
- Products: Hydraulic presses, metalworking machines, pumps, pump stations
- Website: www.nztsg.ru

Tyazhstankohydropress (Russian: Тяжстанкогидропресс) is a plant in Kirovsky District of Novosibirsk, Russia. It produces hydraulic presses, metalworking machines, pumps, pump stations etc. The plant was founded in 1943.

== History ==
In 1943, the plant produced the first hydraulic press.

In 1959, Richard Nixon visited the plant.

== Bibliography ==
- Ламин В. А. (2003). Энциклопедия. Новосибирск. Новосибирск: Новосибирское книжное издательство. p. 896. ISBN 5-7620-0968-8.
