= Kyshtovsky District =

Kyshtovsky District Кыштовский район (Russian)
- District
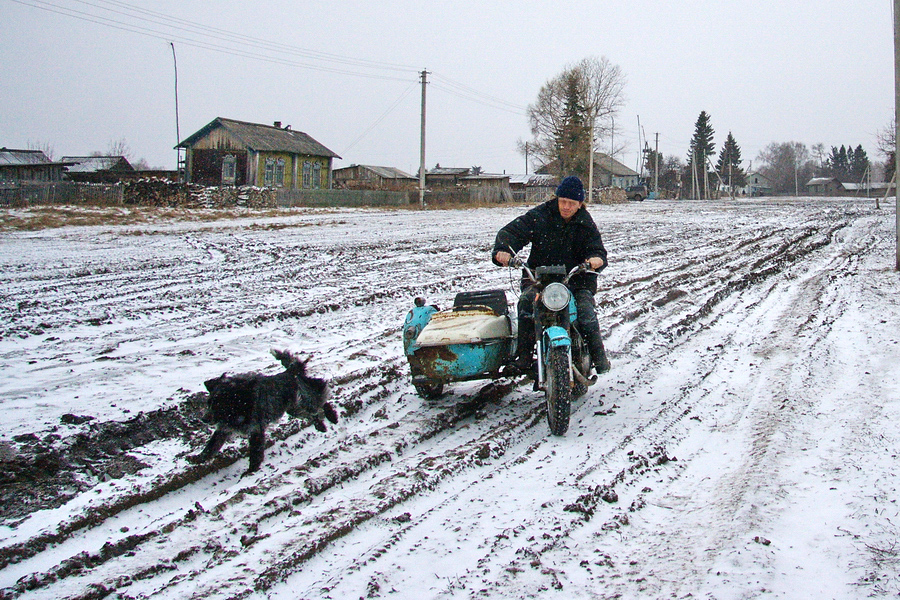
- Nikolaevka Village, Kyshtovsky District

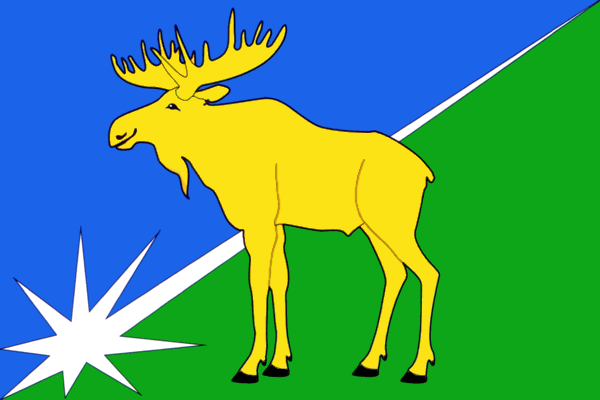
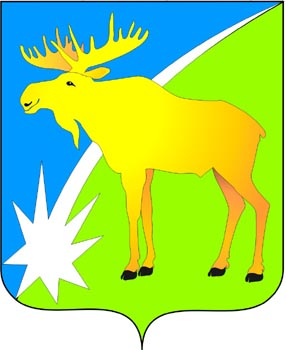
- Flag Coat of arms
- Location of Kyshtovsky District in Novosibirsk Oblast
- Coordinates: 56°33′49″N 76°37′23″E
- Country: Russia
- Federal subject: Novosibirsk Oblast
- Established: 1925
- Administrative center: Kyshtovka

Area
  - Total: 11,101 km^{2} (4,286 sq mi)

Population (2010 Census)
  - Total: 12,399
  - Density: 1.1169/km^{2} (2.8928/sq mi)
  - Urban: 0%
  - Rural: 100%

Administrative structure
  - Inhabited localities: 54 rural localities

Municipal structure
  - Municipally incorporated as: Kyshtovsky Municipal District
  - Municipal divisions: 0 urban settlements, 17 rural settlements
- Time zone: UTC+7 (MSK+4)
- OKTMO ID: 50634000
- Website: https://kyshtovka.nso.ru/

Kyshtovsky District (Russian: Кыштовский райо́н) is an administrative and municipal district (raion), one of the thirty in Novosibirsk Oblast, Russia. It is located in the northwest of the oblast. The area of the district is 11,101 square kilometers (4,286 sq mi). Its administrative center is the rural locality (a selo) of Kyshtovka. Population: 12,399 (2010 Census); 16,427 (2002 census); 19,081 (1989 Soviet census). The population of Kyshtovka accounts for 42.6% of the district's total population.
