= NPO ELSIB =

- Company type: Joint-stock company
- Founded: 1953
- Headquarters: Novosibirsk, Russia
- Website: elsib.ru

NPO "ELSIB" OAO (Russian: НПО "ЭЛСИБ" ОАО) (ELSIB Research and Production Association Open Joint Stock Company) is a machine building company involved in the research, production and design of electric generators and large machines for metallurgy. It is based in Novosibirsk, Russia.

== Overview ==
The company has three main production segments: turbogenerators and hydroelectric generators; asynchronous motors and frequency converters, as well as other equipment, such as drives of the wheel and excitation systems. In addition, the company provides repair and modernization services for both equipment of its own production as well as other producers. Production facilities are concentrated in a single industrial site supporting almost the full production cycle, while the use of co-operation and subcontracting is being kept at minimum. As of 2008, the company's work force consists of about 1200-1300 people.

Most of the company's sales go to domestic customers in industries such as oil and gas, chemical, electric and thermal power transportation, coal and metallurgy.

In 2008, NPO ELSIB was the largest company of Novosibirsk Oblast receiving foreign investment. During its history, NPO ELSIB has delivered turbo- and hydrogenerators to more than 700 power plants worldwide. Currently, more than 60,000 large electric machines produced by the company are being operated in 52 countries of the world. About 30% of power plants in Russia use generators produced by NPO ELSIB. The company's stock is listed at the Russian Trading System.

== History ==
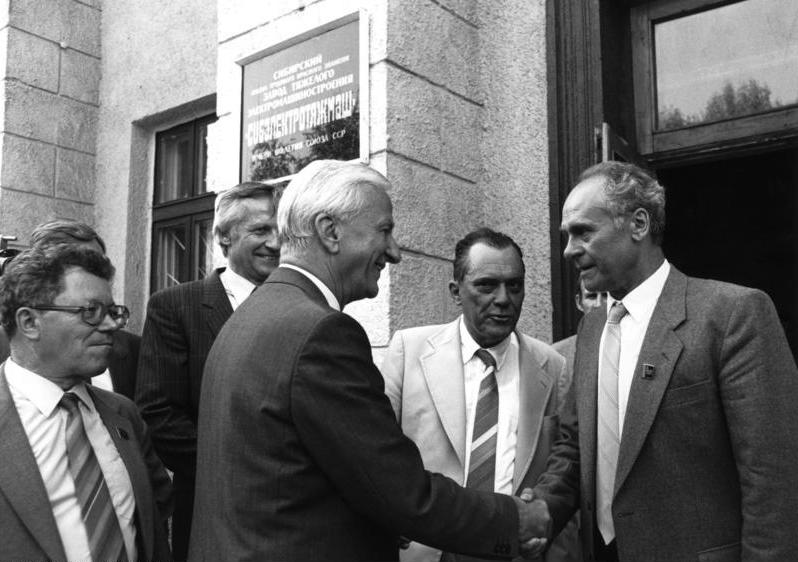
President of Germany Richard von Weizsäcker and director of Sibelektrotyazhmash Vladimir Shalimov (right) near the entrance to the plant in 1987.

NPO ELSIB's history dates back to the 1950s, when it was founded as the "Novosibirsk turbogenerator plant." In 1957 the company achieved its first foreign exports. By the end of the 1960s, the company became one of the leading players of the Russian machine building sector. In 1988, the enterprise was transformed into the Research and Production Corporation "Sibelectrotyazhmash." In 1992 it became the JSC "ELSIB," which was then transformed into the present company in 2001, by a merger with the Research Institute "ELSIB."
