= Novosibirsk Oblast =

First-level administrative division of Russia

Novosibirsk Oblast Новосибирская область (Russian)
- Oblast
- Flag Coat of arms

- Coordinates: 55°27′N 79°33′E
- Country: Russia
- Federal district: Siberian
- Economic region: West Siberian
- Established: September 28, 1937
- Administrative center: Novosibirsk

Government
  - Body: Legislative Assembly
  - Governor: Andrey Travnikov

Area
  - Total: 177,756 km^{2} (68,632 sq mi)
  - Rank: 18th

Population (2021 census)
  - Total: 2,797,176 ▲
  - Estimate (2018): 2,788,849
  - Rank: 15th
  - Density: 15.7360/km^{2} (40.7562/sq mi)
  - Urban: 79.6%
  - Rural: 20.4%

GDP (nominal, 2024)
  - Total: ₽2.22 trillion (US$26 billion)
  - Per capita: ₽793,881 (US$9,315.56)
- Time zone: UTC+7 (MSK+4)
- ISO 3166 code: RU-NVS
- License plates: 54, 154
- OKTMO ID: 50000000
- Official languages: Russian
- Website: novo-sibirsk.ru

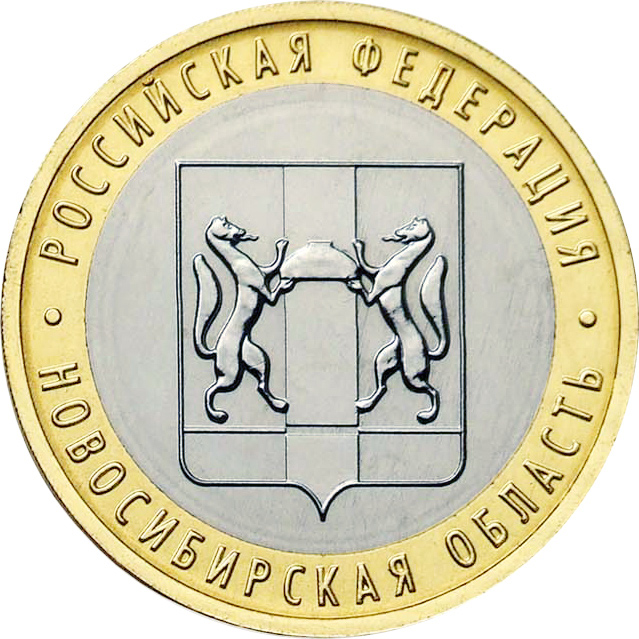
The reverse side of the commemorative coins Bank of Russia (2007)

Novosibirsk Oblast (Note: Russian: Новосиби́рская о́бласть, romanized: Novosibirskaya oblastʹ) is a federal subject of Russia (an oblast) located in southwestern Siberia. Its administrative and economic center is the city of Novosibirsk, the third-largest city in the country. As of the 2021 Census, Novosibirsk Oblast had a population of 2,797,176 with the majority, 1.63 million, lives in Novosibirsk.

== Geography ==
=== Overview ===
Novosibirsk Oblast is located in the south of the West Siberian Plain, at the foothills of low Salair ridge, between the Ob and Irtysh Rivers. The oblast borders Omsk Oblast in the west, Kazakhstan (Pavlodar Province) in the southwest, Tomsk Oblast in the north, Kemerovo Oblast in the east, and Altai Krai in the south. The territory of the oblast extends for more than 600 kilometers (370 mi) from west to east, and for over 400 kilometers (250 mi) from north to south. The oblast is mainly plain; in the south the steppes prevail; in the north enormous tracts of woodland with great number of marshes prevail. There are many lakes, the largest ones located at the south. The majority of the rivers belong to the Ob basin, many of them falling in dead lakes. Among the main lakes are Chany, Sartlan, Tandovo and Ubinskoye.

=== Natural resources ===
As of 2007, the oil reserves of the region amounted to 204 million tons. In addition, Novosibirsk Oblast had free gas reserves of 600 million cubic meters, solute gas reserves of 5.2 billion cubic meters, and gas condensate reserves of 121,000 tons. Most of the oil and gas reserves are located in the Severny and Kyshtovsky districts.

The following metals can be found in the region: zirconium dioxide (0.7 million tons), titanium dioxide (2.9 million tons), bauxite (2,068,000 tons), and tin (588,000 tons). In addition, there are twenty-three fields of alluvial placer gold in the region (nineteen of which were being developed and prospected in 2006) and seven residual soil gold fields suitable for open-cut mining in the southeast.

Novosibirsk Oblast has 5.527 million tons of high-quality anthracite, as well as 2.720 million tons of long-flame and coking coal. Most of these are located in the Iskitim and Toguchin districts. The north part of the region also has peat fields with estimated reserves of 7.6 billion tons. Prospected mineral water reserves in the region amount to 6,948 cubic meters per day. The popular Karachinskaya mineral water originates from the region.

The oblast has 4,531,800 hectares or 45,318 square kilometres of forests, with 509.88 million cubic meters of timber reserves. Most of the region's forests consist of softwood. Softwood forests cover an area of 3,481,300 hectares or 34,813 square kilometres, while softwood timber is spread out over 387.96 million cubic meters. Coniferous forests - located mostly near the Ob River and the Salair Ridge - cover an area of 1,011,900 hectares or 10,119 square kilometres with timber reserves of 121.39 million cubic meters. The economic potential of the forests is reduced by the fact that most of them are located in the north of the region, in areas that are difficult to access.

=== Climate ===
Novosibirsk Oblast has a continental climate. Average temperature is −19 °C (−2 °F) in January and +19 °C (66 °F) in July. Annual precipitation is 300–500 millimeters (12–20 in).

== History ==
During the Middle Ages the region was populated by Siberian Tatar tribes (Baraba and Chat). Being constantly raided by Oirat nomads throughout the first centuries of the exploration of Siberia future Novosibirsk Oblast did not attract many Russian colonists, who preferred to settle around more northerly Tomsk. The first Russian village Maslyanino was founded in 1644. In 1716, officer Ivan Butkeyev built the Berd fortress that later became the city of Berdsk, the main center of future colonization and development of the region. Like many other parts of Siberia, the Berd lands became a safe haven for political dissents, fugitive serfs and religious sects from all across Russia.

For the most parts of its history, the Novosibirsk Oblast belonged to the Tomsk administration, initially as a part of the Tomsk uyezd of the Tobolsk Governorate and later, starting with 1804, the separate Tomsk Governorate. The turning point in history of the region was the construction of the Trans-Siberian and the Turkestan–Siberian railways. Founded in 1893, Novosibirsk, then Novonikolayevsk, became a transport hub of sub-regional importance and surpassed other major Siberian cities like Omsk and Tomsk in mere decades. In 1920, the capital of the Tomsk Governorate was moved to Novonikolayevsk, in 1921 the Novonikolayevsk Governorate was established. In 1925, most of the Siberian governorates were united as the Siberian Krai with Novosibirsk as the capital. In 1930, it was split into West Siberian (Novosibirsk) and East Siberian (Irkutsk) krais, the former existed until 1937. The Novosibirsk Oblast was finally established on September 28, 1937. Kemerovo and Tomsk became separate from it only in 1943–1944.

== Politics ==
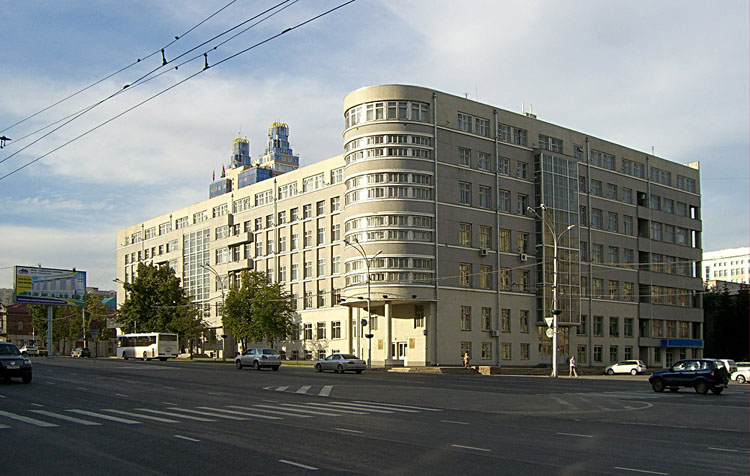
Novosibirsk Oblast Government building

During the Soviet period, the high authority in the oblast was shared between three persons: The first secretary of the Novosibirsk CPSU Committee (who in reality had the greatest authority), the chairman of the oblast Soviet (legislative power), and the Chairman of the oblast Executive Committee (executive power). Since 1991, CPSU lost power, and the head of the Oblast administration, and eventually governor were appointed/elected alongside the elected regional parliament.

The Charter of Novosibirsk Oblast is the fundamental law of the region. The Legislative Assembly of Novosibirsk Oblast is the province's standing legislative (representative) body. The Legislative Assembly exercises its authority by passing laws, resolutions, and other legal acts and by supervising the implementation and observance of the laws and other legal acts passed by it. The highest executive body is the Oblast Government, which includes territorial executive bodies such as district administrations, committees, and commissions that facilitate development and run the day to day matters of the province. The Oblast administration supports the activities of the Governor who is the highest official and acts as guarantor of the observance of the oblast Charter in accordance with the Constitution of Russia.

=== Legislature ===
The Legislative Assembly of Novosibirsk Oblast consists of 76 deputies. The last elections took place on 13 September 2020. The term of office of the Legislative Assembly is five years.

Factions of political parties in the Legislative Assembly:

- United Russia — 45 deputies
- Communist Party of the Russian Federation — 13 deputies
- Liberal Democratic Party of Russia — 6 deputies
- New People — 3 deputies
- A Just Russia — 2 deputies
- Rodina — 2 deputies
- Russian Party of Pensioners for Social Justice — 2 deputies
- Independent — 3 deputies.

== Demographics ==
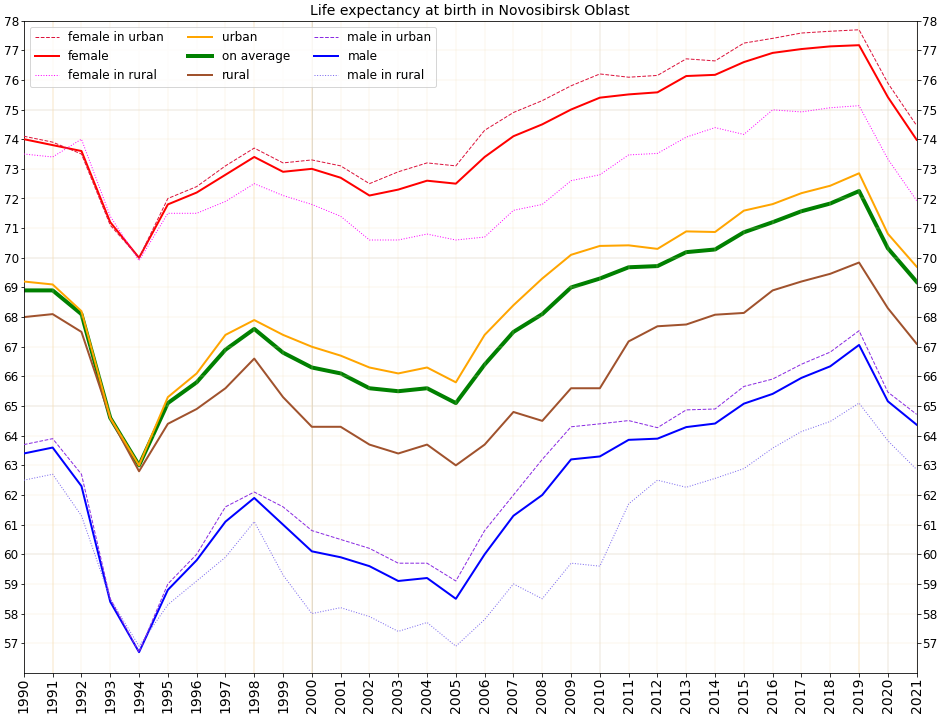
Life expectancy at birth in Novosibirsk Oblast

Historical population
Year	Pop.	±%
1959	2,298,481	—
1970	2,505,249	+9.0%
1979	2,618,024	+4.5%
1989	2,782,005	+6.3%
2002	2,692,251	−3.2%
2010	2,665,911	−1.0%
2021	2,797,176	+4.9%
Source: Census data

Population: 2,797,176 (2021 census); 2,665,911 (2010 census); 2,692,251 (2002 census); 2,782,005 (1989 Soviet census).

Almost 3/4 of region`s population (2,069,715) reside in Novosibirsk and surrounding areas (2019).

According to the 2021 Census, the ethnic composition of the oblast was 94.2% Russians; 0.7% Volga-Ural-Siberian Tatars; 0.7% Germans; 0.4% Tajiks; 0.4% Ukrainians; 0.4% Kazakhs; 0.4% Uzbeks; 0.3% Kyrgyz; 0.2% Armenians and 0.2% Azerbaijanis. Additionally, 475,688 people were registered from administrative databases, and could not declare an ethnicity. It is estimated that the proportion of ethnicities in this group is the same as that of the declared group.

Vital statistics for 2024:

- Births: 24,689 (8.9 per 1,000)
- Deaths: 37,306 (13.4 per 1,000)

Total fertility rate (2024):
1.46 children per woman

Life expectancy (2021):
Total — 69.19 years (male — 64.37, female — 73.98)

Vital statistics since 1990

Year	Population	Live Births	Deaths	Natural Change	Crude Birth Rate (per 1000)	Crude Death Rate (per 1000)	Natural Change (per 1000)	Total Fertility Rate
1990	2,742,075	36116	29558	6558	13,2	10,8	2,4	1,832
1991	2,744,809	33124	29880	3244	12,1	10,9	1,2	1,706
1992	2,749,253	28516	31872	-3356	10,4	11,6	-1,2	1,486
1993	2,746,874	24268	39371	-15103	8,9	14,4	-5,5	1,280
1994	2,733,738	24042	43210	-19168	8,8	15,8	-7,0	1,270
1995	2,732,352	23486	38756	-15270	8,6	14,2	-5,6	1,227
1996	2,732,721	22824	37833	-15009	8,4	13,9	-5,5	1,179
1997	2,729,750	22785	36118	-13333	8,3	13,2	-4,9	1,158
1998	2,732,245	22564	35147	-12583	8,3	12,9	-4,6	1,128
1999	2,734,031	21688	37165	-15477	7,9	13,6	-5,7	1,070
2000	2,725,499	23138	38522	-15384	8,5	14,2	-5,7	1,125
2001	2,715,128	24791	39311	-14520	9,2	14,5	-5,3	1,187
2002	2,692,251	26990	41436	-14446	10,0	15,4	-5,4	1,319
2003	2,688,423	28389	41579	-13190	10,6	15,5	-4,9	1,320
2004	2,672,835	28993	41135	-12142	10,9	15,4	-4,5	1,341
2005	2,662,315	28269	42719	-14450	10,6	16,1	-5,5	1,303
2006	2,649,880	27906	40241	-12335	10,5	15,2	-4,7	1,284
2007	2,640,656	30136	38818	-8682	11,4	14,7	-3,3	1,387
2008	2,635,642	33056	38329	-5273	12,5	14,5	-2,0	1,519
2009	2,639,857	34249	37203	-2954	12,9	14,0	-1,1	1,567
2010	2,665,911	35073	37055	-1982	13,2	13,9	-0,7	1,598
2011	2,666,465	34955	36358	-1403	13,1	13,6	-0,5	1,591
2012	2,686,863	37588	36675	913	13,9	13,6	0,3	1,711
2013	2,709,461	38295	36571	1724	14,1	13,4	0,7	1,749
2014	2,731,176	38387	36356	2031	14,0	13,3	0,7	1,765
2015	2,746,822	39078	36028	3050	14,2	13,1	1,1	1,817
2016	2,762,237	38185	36151	2034	13,8	13,0	0,8	1,805
2017	2,779,555	34448	35830	-1382	12,4	12,9	-0,5	1,665
2018	2,788,849	32673	36168	-3495	11,7	13,0	-1,3	1,626
2019	2,793,384	30023	35605	-5582	10,7	12,7	-2,0	1,556
2020	2,798,170	28859	42833	-13974	10,3	15,3	-5,0	1,550
2021	2,797,176	28273	47189	-18916	10,2	17,0	-6,8	1,571

Major urban centers in 2021 were Novosibirsk (with a population of 1,633,595), Berdsk (102,850), Iskitim (57,147), Kuybyshev (41,946).

In 2016, Novosibirsk became the first oblast in Russia to ban immigrants from select nations from working in jobs such as construction, agriculture, teaching, medicine, and professional jobs. Immigrants already working in Novosibirsk Oblast have to leave after the next three months by the time the ban takes effect in December 2016.

=== Settlements ===
Largest cities or towns in Novosibirsk Oblast 2021 Russian Census
Rank		Administrative division	Pop.
1	Novosibirsk	City of oblast significance of Novosibirsk	1,633,595
2	Berdsk	Town of oblast significance of Berdsk	102,850
3	Iskitim	Town of oblast significance of Iskitim	57,147
4	Kuybyshev	Town of oblast significance of Kuybyshev	41,946
5	Ob	Town of oblast significance of Ob	30,369
6	Barabinsk	Town of oblast significance of Barabinsk	27,648
7	Karasuk	Karasuksky District	24,890
8	Tatarsk	Town of oblast significance of Tatarsk	23,711
9	Toguchin	Toguchinsky District	20,766
10	Cherepanovo	Cherepanovsky District	19,900

=== Religion ===
Religion in Novosibirsk Oblast as of 2012 (Sreda Arena Atlas)
Russian Orthodoxy	24.9%
Other Christians	4.7%
Islam	1.1%
Rodnovery and other native faiths	1%
Spiritual but not religious	31.9%
Atheism and irreligion	25.4%
Other and undeclared	11%

Novosibirsk Oblast is one of the most non-religious regions of Russia.

According to a 2012 survey 24.9% of the population of Novosibirsk Oblast adheres to the Russian Orthodox Church, 5% are unaffiliated generic Christians, 1% of the population adheres to the Slavic native faith (Rodnovery), and 1% to Islam. In addition, 32% of the population declares to be "spiritual but not religious", 25% is atheist, and 11.1% follows other religions or did not give an answer to the question.

== Economy ==
Novosibirsk Oblast's gross regional product in 2007 was $14,950.2 million. GRP per capita was 144,869 roubles; somewhat under the national average of 198,817 roubles. For many years, the region experienced relatively high rates of industrial output growth: between 1999 and 2008 industrial output grew 170%, exceeding the Russian average growth by 23%.

=== Industry ===
Major industrial activities—accounting for over 80% of the total shipped products and services—are basic metals and fabricated metal products, electricity, gas and water supply, fuel extraction, food products and beverages.

Manufacturing accounted for 67.4% of the region's industrial output in 2007. The most notable sector was food products, beverages and tobacco (20.7%). The region produced a total of 278,100 tons of whole milk products, 144,100 tons of bread and baked goods, 6,300 tons of pasta, 54,100 tons of meat, 518.7 million decaliters of mineral water (including the popular Karachinskaya mark), 137,300 tons of mixed fodder and 218,700 tons of flour.

The basic metals and fabricated metal products sector contributed 10.3% of total industrial output. The region produced 190,800 tons of steel pipes, 405,700 tons of rolled ferrous metals, 36,100 tons of steel, 1.300 tons of welding electrodes and 1,100 tons of construction frames and products. Notable companies in this sector include OAO Novosibirsk Electrode Plant, OAO Novosibirsk Tin Mill and OAO Kuzmin Novosibirsk Metals Plant.

In the mechanical engineering sector, electrical and optical machinery and equipment accounted for 7.2% of total industrial output; machinery and equipment (exclusive of weapons or ammunition) accounted for 3.7%, while electrical machinery and transport equipment accounted for 4.5%. One of the largest companies is the aircraft-maker Novosibirsk Aircraft Production Association, which assembles Su-34 fighters, among others.

In 2007, the region produced $12,190,000 worth of high-voltage electric equipment, $3,820,000 worth of low-voltage electric equipment, $1,350,000 worth of computers and spare parts, 71,000 kW equivalent of generators for steam, gas and hydraulic turbines, 296,200 units of electric razors, 154,600 units of chandeliers and suspensions, 1,616,000 units of capacitors, 3,608,000 units of semiconductor instruments, 1,077,000 units of integral microchips, 218 units of large electric machines, 854 units of direct current electric machines and 5,000 kilovolts-amperes equivalent of prefabricated transforming stations. Notable companies in this sector include OAO Novosibirsk Electric Locomotive Repair Plant, OAO Sibselmash Scientific Production Association, NPO ELSIB, OAO Novosibirsk Railroad Switch Plant, OAO Tyazhstankogidropress, OAO Novosibirsk Instrument Plant and OAO Novosibirsk Soyuz Electrovacuum Holding plant. All of the aforementioned companies are located in the regional capital, Novosibirsk.

=== Energy ===
As of 2007, Novosibirsk Oblast enjoyed an electricity surplus, with electricity output of 14.0 billion kWh, while consumption was 12.5 billion kWh. During the summer, 30% of the region's electricity needs were satisfied by the Novosibirsk Hydroelectric Station, which has a capacity of 455 MW. Another important source of electricity is thermal power. The largest thermal power plant is Novosibirsk Thermal Power Plant 5 with a capacity of 1,200 MW. Most of the power plants and the distribution infrastructure are operated by the company OJSC Novosibirskenergo.

The amount of oil produced in the region in 2007 was 2,495,000 tons, while coal production was 1,795,000 tons.

=== Trade and investment ===
In the 2005/2006 ranking "Best Legal Conditions for Investment"–conducted by the Expert RA rating agency–Novosibirsk Oblast received the third place among all 89 federal subjects of Russia.

In 2007, the oblast received $88.8 million in foreign investment. The largest company receiving foreign investment was NPO ELSIB.
