= Berd (disambiguation) =

Berd could refer to:

- Berd Municipality, in Tavush Province, Armenia
  Berd, the eponymous town within the municipality
- Berd (dance), Armenian dance
- Berd (river), in the Siberian Federal District, Russia
  Berd Bay, a body of water between the river and Novosibirsk Reservoir
  Berd Rocks, a natural monument
  Berd Spit, a city park
- Françoise Berd (1923–2001), Canadian actress

== See also ==
- Bird (disambiguation)
- Berding, a surname
