= Shadrikha (Berd) =

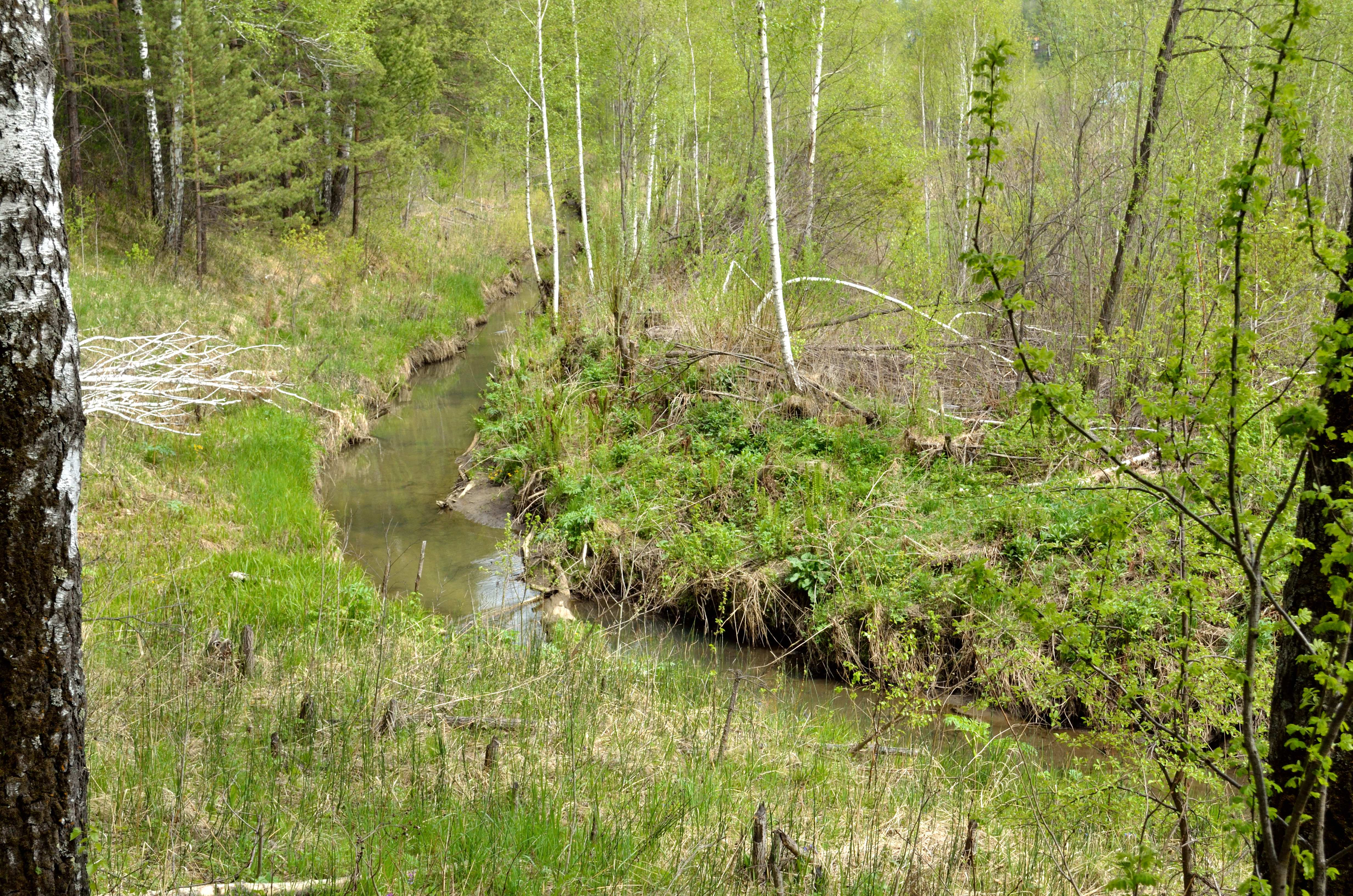
- Native name: Шадриха (Russian)

Location
- Country: Russia
- Region: Novosibirsk Oblast

Physical characteristics
- Mouth: Berd
  - coordinates: 54°46′48″N 83°10′11″E
- Length: 17 km (11 mi)

Shadrikha is a river in Novosibirsky and Iskitimsky districts of Novosibirsk Oblast. The river flows into the Berd Bay. Its length is 17 km (11 mi).

== Tourism ==
From 12 to 14 July 2019, a historical reconstruction took place near the mouth of the river. Residents of Novosibirsk, Tomsk and Zheleznogorsk reconstructed the atmosphere of the Caribbean archipelago of the early 17th century.
