= Khrenovy Island =

Island in Novosibirsk Reservoir, Russia

Native name: Хреновый остров
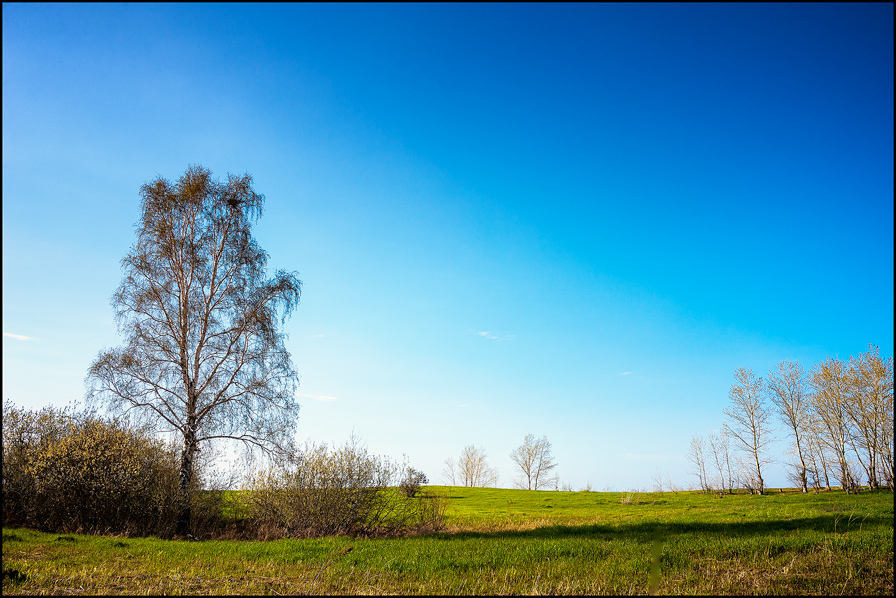
- Interactive map of Khrenovy Island

Geography
- Location: Novosibirsk Reservoir
- Coordinates: 54°46′54″N 83°00′49″E

Administration
- Russia
- Oblast: Novosibirsk Oblast

Khrenovy Island (Russian: Хреновый остров) is a small uninhabited island in the Ob Sea near Berd Spit.

== History ==
Archaeologists have found a Bronze Age stone mace on the island.

Before the emergence of the Novosibirsk Reservoir, the island was the southern part of Berdsk.
