= Ulybino (Novosibirsk Oblast) =

Village in Iskitimsky district, Russia

Ulybino Улыбино
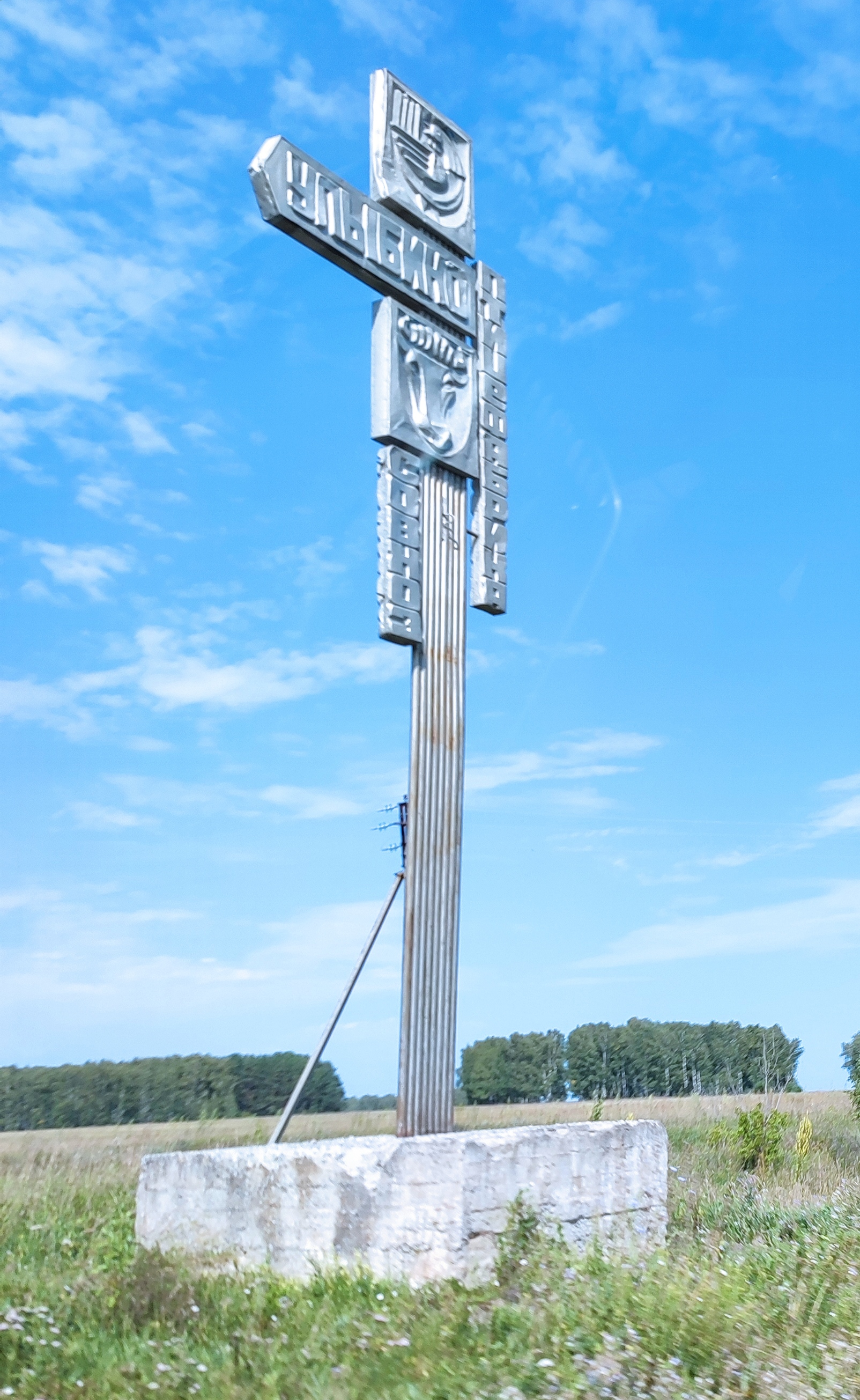
- Village sign
- Interactive map of Ulybino
- Location of Ulybino
- Coordinates: 54°34′34″N 82°55′41″E
- Country: Russia
- Federal subject: Novosibirsk Oblast

Area
  - Total: 1.65 km^{2} (0.64 sq mi)

Population
  - Estimate (2010): 1,500 )
- Time zone: UTC+7 (MSK+4)
- Postal code: 633248
- OKTMO ID: 50615431101

Ulybino is a village (selo) in Iskitimsky District, Novosibirsk Oblast, Russia.

== Geography ==
The area of the village is 165 hectares (2007). Ulybino is located on river Miltysh.

== History ==
The Ulybin brothers, whose ancestors were service class people, founded the village in 18th century. Ulybino is first mentioned in 1775 in a document of the Archival Department of Tomsk region. Ulybino was related to the parish of the Sretensky Church, which was located in Berdsky Ostrog.

== Population ==
Year	Population
1755	28
1787	190
1928	996
2002	1,607
2007	1,848
2010	1,500
