= Taiwan (Novosibirsk Reservoir) =

Island in Novosibirsk Reservoir, Russia

Taiwan’
Native name: Тайвань
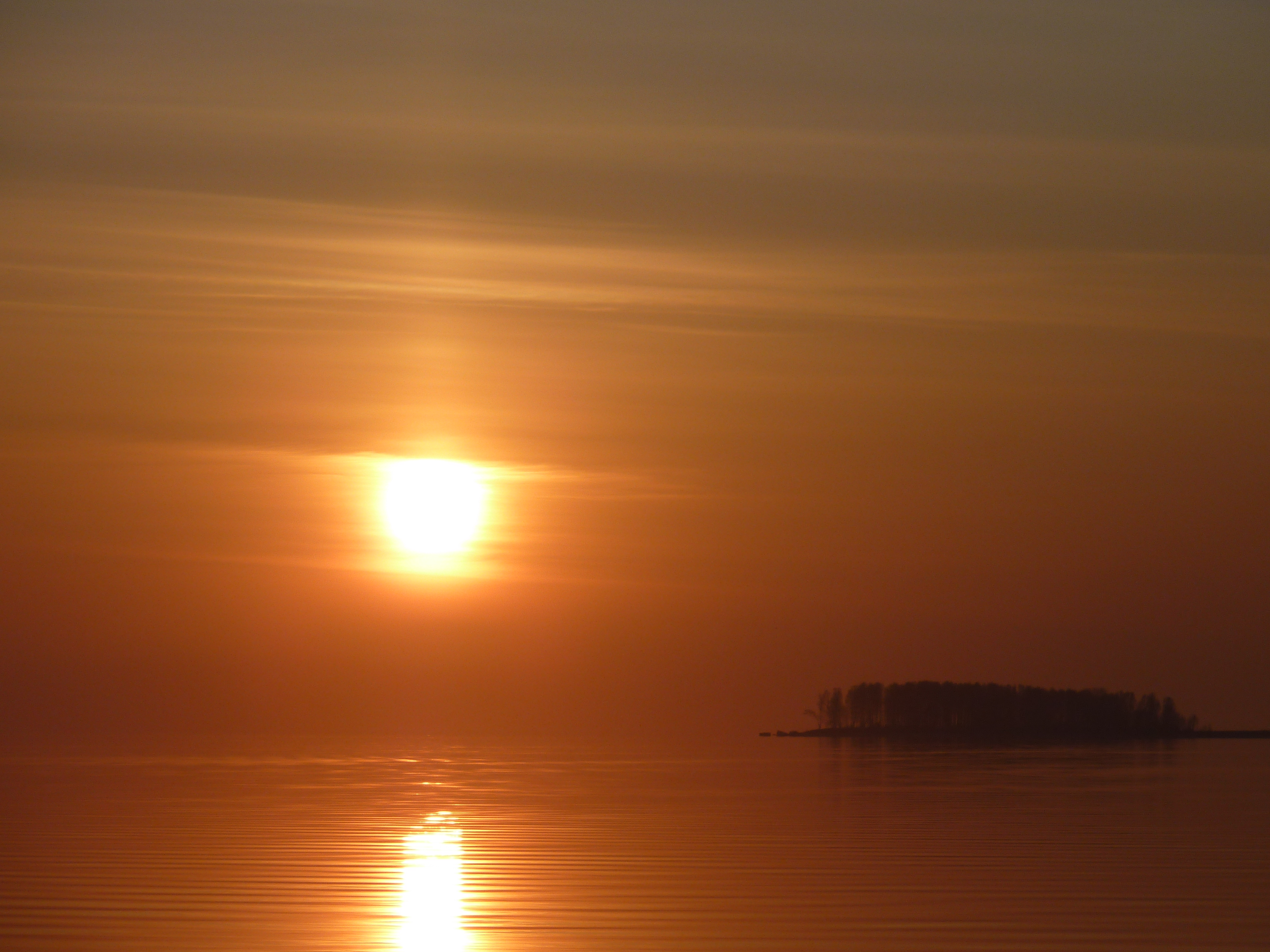
- Interactive map of Taiwan’

Geography
- Location: Novosibirsk Reservoir
- Coordinates: 54°49′00″N 83°02′15″E

Administration
- Russia
- Oblast: Novosibirsk Oblast
- District: Novosibirsky District
- Municipality: Morskoy

Taiwan’ (Russian: Тайвань) or also Tan’-Wan’ (Russian: Тань-Вань) is an uninhabited island in the Novosibirsk Reservoir. It belongs to the territory of the municipality of Morskoy in the Novosibirsky District of the Novosibirsk Oblast.

== History ==
The island was formed as a result of the filling of the Novosibirsk Reservoir. The island's initial name — Taiwan’ — was linked to the fact that it had physically separated from the mainland, much like Taiwan (Formosa) separated from mainland China in a political sense. The island's second name — Tan’-Wan’ — stems from a joke by Mikhail Lavrentyev, regarding the fact that couples in love often sought privacy there ("Тань-Вань" could be translated as "[the island] of women named Tanya and men named Vanya").

Before the construction of the Novosibirsk Hydroelectric Station, the old Berdskoye Highway, which connected Novosibirsk and Berdsk, ran across the territory of what would become the island. Consequently, after the island was formed, an asphalt road was visible on it, leading from the water into the water.

The island was covered with birch forest. Mushrooms and wild strawberries grew there in abundance. Birds nested on the island.

In the 1960s, researches were conducted on the island. Since the experiments involved explosions, concrete structures were built on the island to serve as shelters for personnel and equipment.

During his two-day visit to Novosibirsk on 30 and 31 May 1970, American astronaut Neil Armstrong visited the island at the invitation of Mikhail Lavrentyev, who had organized a picnic there.

== Current status ==
The island was subject to constant erosion on its windward southwestern side due to the action of currents and winds. Simultaneously, a sand spit was continuously building up on the leeward northeastern side. Consequently, the island's total area shrank, its shape altered, and it effectively "migrated" toward the northeast. By 2025, it was determined that the island's original location was entirely submerged, while the current island — essentially an accreted sandbank — was situated where there had originally (following the filling of the reservoir) been open water. The concrete structures used for experiments are now submerged and pose a certain hazard to navigation in the area. In 1964, the island measured 589 meters in width and 990 meters in length. Today, the island’s greatest width from shore to shore is 450 meters, and the length is 633 meters. As 2025 forecasts state, the island could completely disappear within a decade without a shore protection measures.
