= NOEMA (company) =

Audio equipment manufacturer

- Founded: 1929
- Headquarters: Novosibirsk, Russia
- Products: electrodynamic speaker drivers, loudspeakers, amplifiers
- Website: www.noema.ru

NOEMA (Russian: НОЭМА) is an audio equipment manufacturer. The company was founded in Novosibirsk in 1929 and originally produced musical instruments.

== History ==
In 1929, the Symfoniya Artel was created in Novosibirsk. It begins to produce string instruments (mandolins, balalaikas, guitars).

In 1932–1940 the company produced accordions.

During the Great Patriotic War Symfoniya manufactured machine-gun carriages, shell boxes, and fittings for military equipment.

In 1950–1951 the enterprise produced "Qvinta" and "Simfoniya" accordions.

During the 1950s to 1970s, the company produced pianos (Sibir, Beryozka, Elegiya, Chaika, Ob, Noctyurn).

In the 1990s, the company began to produce electrodynamic speaker drivers for tape recorders which were produced by Berdsk Vega Production Association, but in 1996, NOEMA ceased cooperation with this organization due to economic difficulties.

In 2004, together with Sibirtelecom, it developed and participated in the assembly of 2000 payphones.

In 2007, the company produced a miniature pulse amplifier Pervenets.

== Activity ==
NOEMA manufactures electrodynamic speaker drivers, loudspeakers, amplifiers, etc.

Also the enterprise is engaged in the installation of its products. For example, the company equipped secondary schools, the fountains near Globus Theater, Park named after Kirov, Spartak and Sibselmash stadiums with acoustic systems.

== Bibliography ==
- Ламин В. А. (2003). Энциклопедия. Новосибирск. Новосибирск: Новосибирское книжное издательство. p. 627. ISBN 5-7620-0968-8.
