= Berd Rocks =

Russian natural monuments

Berd Rocks Бердские скалы
- Rock formation
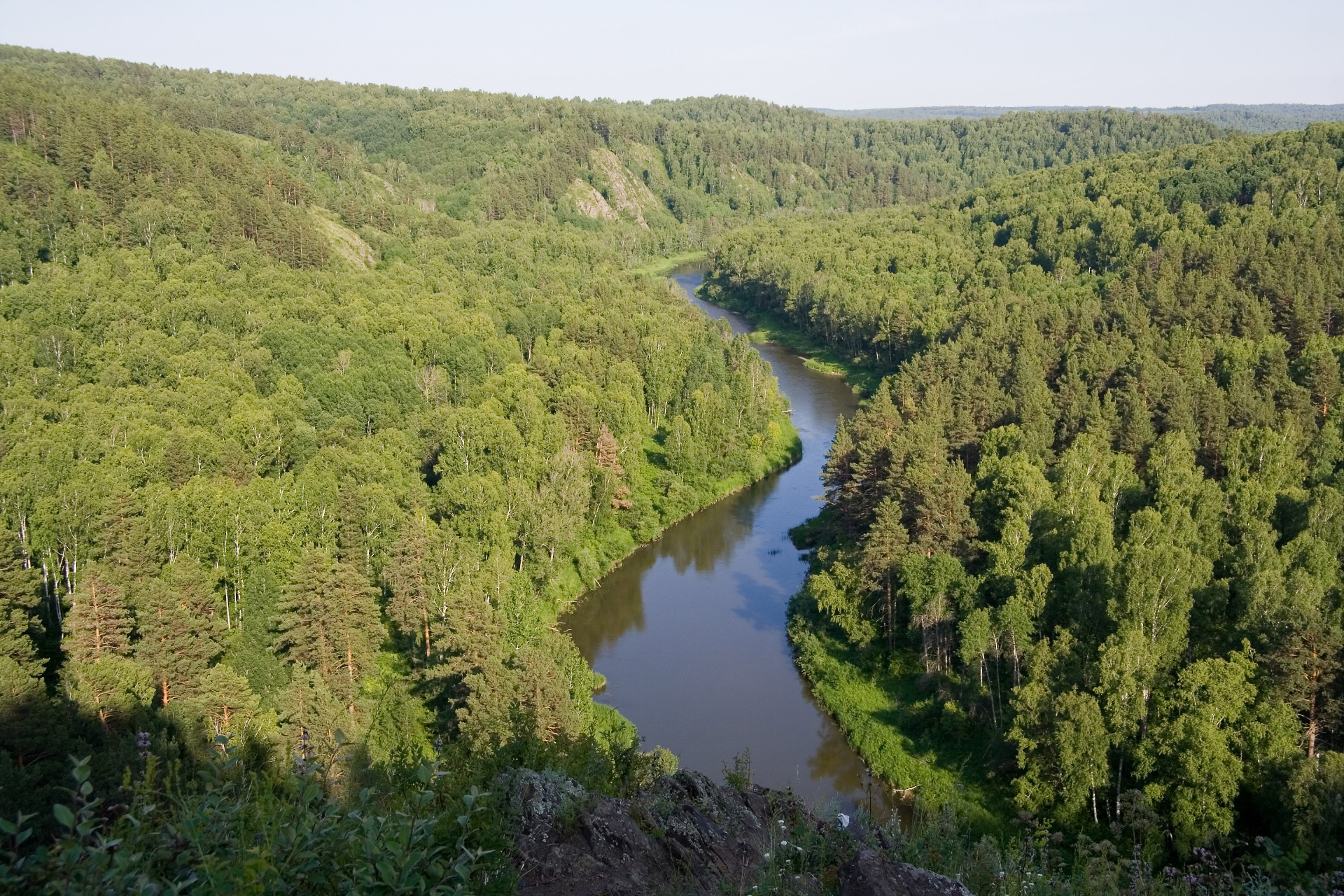
- Berd River flowing through the Berd Rocks

- Coordinates: 54.6094°N 84.0106°E
- Location: Novosibirsk Oblast, Russia

Berd Rocks is a natural monuments in Iskitimsky District of Novosibirsk Oblast, Russia. Its area is 26.7 hectares.

== Flora ==
87 species of vascular plants were registered here, 7 of these species are listed in the Novosibirsk Oblast Red Data Book: Asplenium ruta-muraria, Asplenium septentrionale, Tulipa patens, Erythronium sibiricum, Cerastium maximum, Cypripedium macranthos, Gagea fedtschenkoana.

== Fauna ==
19 species of mammals, 48 species of birds, 2 species of lizards and over 300 species of invertebrates live here. Of particular interest is the insects, which is poorly studied.

Species listed in the Novosibirsk Oblast Red Data Book: Gray marmot, European honey buzzard, Ural owl, Hawfinch, butterflies Apollo and Swallowtail, dragonflies Detka pyatnoglazy and Macromia amphigena fraenata.
