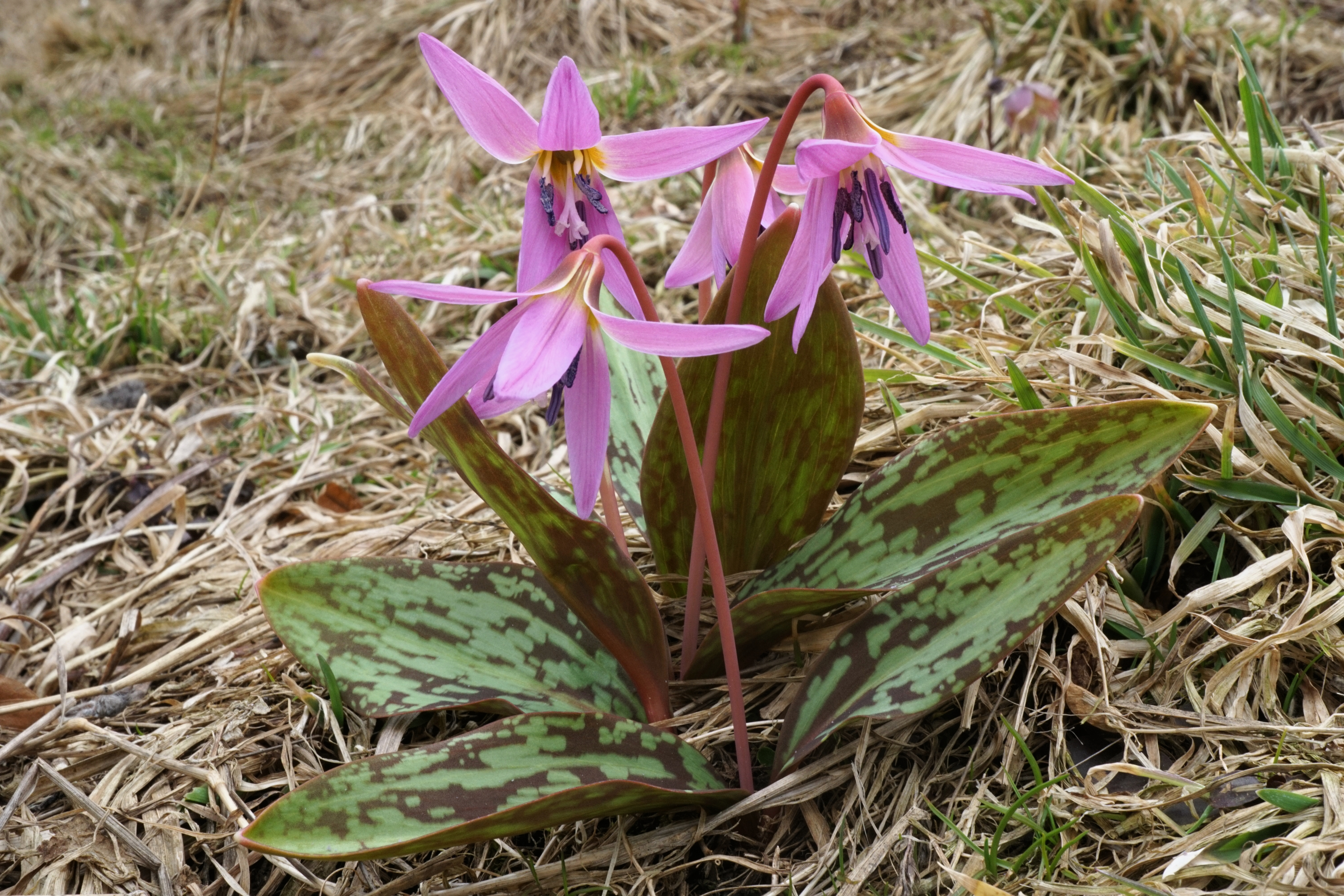
- In the Carpathian Mountains, Romania
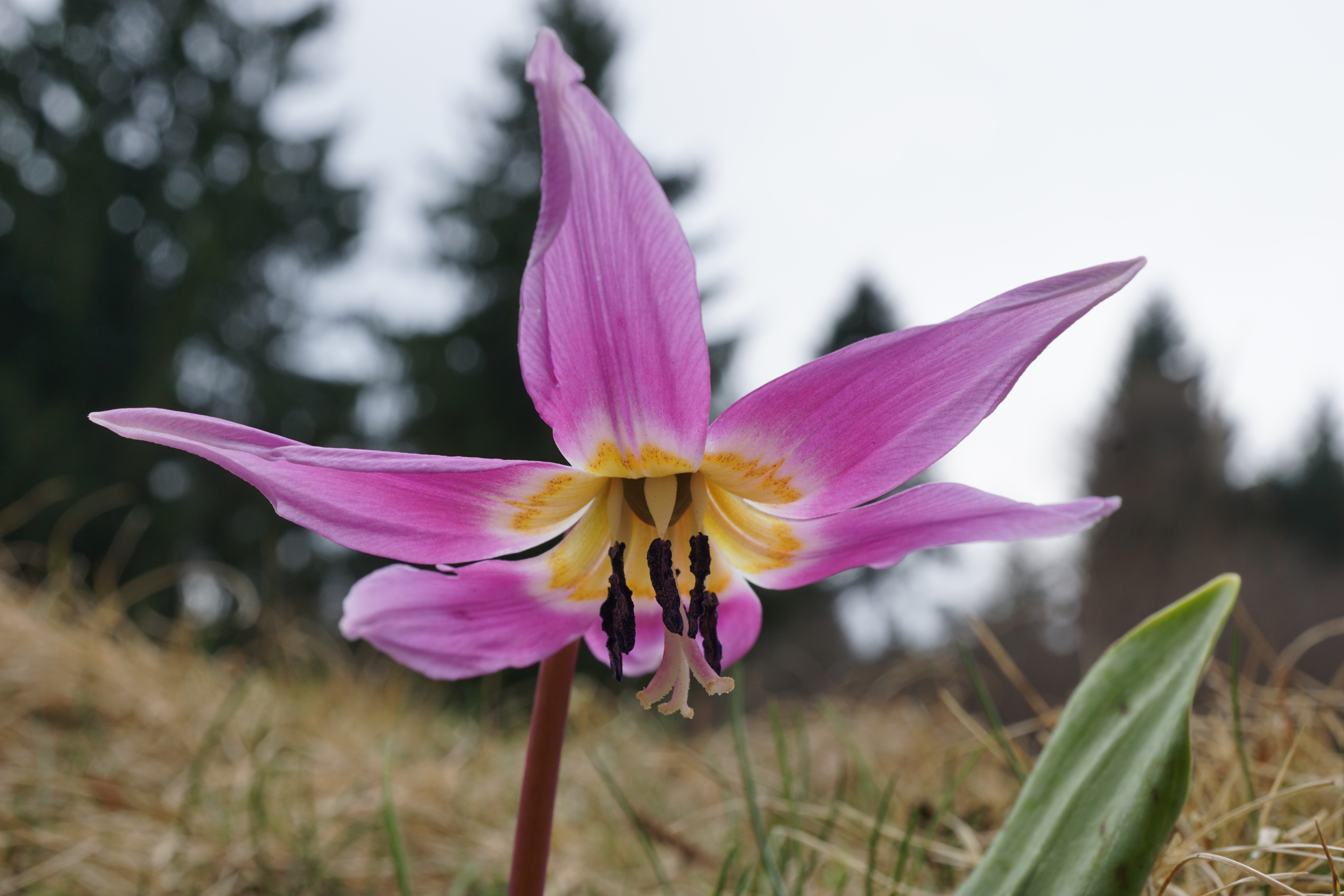
- Close-up of a flower from below, Romania

Scientific classification
- Kingdom: Plantae
- Clade: Tracheophytes
- Clade: Angiosperms
- Clade: Monocots
- Order: Liliales
- Family: Liliaceae
- Subfamily: Lilioideae
- Genus: Erythronium
- Species: E. dens-canis

Binomial name
- Erythronium dens-canis L.

Synonyms
- Synonymy: Erythronium bifidum Sweet; Erythronium bulbosum St.-Lag.; Erythronium caninum Dulac; Erythronium latifolium Schur; Erythronium longifolium Mill.; Erythronium maculatum DC.; Erythronium maculosum Lam.; Erythronium niveum (Baumg.) Pînzaru; Erythronium obtusiflorum Opiz; Erythronium ovatifolium Poir.; Erythronium vernale Salisb.

= Erythronium dens-canis =

Dog's-tooth-violet

Species of flowering plant

Erythronium dens-canis, the dog's-tooth-violet is a bulbous herbaceous perennial flowering plant in the family Liliaceae. It is native to central and southern Europe from Portugal to Ukraine, and locally naturalised north to Germany, Great Britain, and Ireland. It, and the closely related Erythronium caucasicum in the extreme southeast of Europe, are the only naturally occurring species of Erythronium in Europe. Despite its common name, it is not closely related to the true violets of genus Viola.

== Description ==
Erythronium dens-canis grows to 6–30 cm (2–12 in) tall, flowering at the beginning of spring from February to April. The flowers are solitary, pink or lilac (rarely white), with six tepals around 3 cm long; these are reflexed at the top and yellow tinted at the base, and with dark purple anthers. The leaves are marbled in glaucous green and pinkish-brown or purple, and are ovate to lanceolate; they grow in pairs. The white bulb is oblong and resembles a dog's tooth, hence the common name "dog's-tooth-violet" and the Latin specific epithet dens-canis, which translates as "dog's tooth".

== Ecology ==
Erythronium dens-canis is found in damp, sunny or lightly shaded settings such as meadows and open woodland, mainly growing at altitudes of 500–2,000 m.

== Taxonomy ==
Numerous names have been coined at varietal rank for plants once considered to be included within Erythronium dens-canis. None of the European varieties is now considered to merit recognition but some of the Asian species are now regarded as distinct species:

- Erythronium dens-canis var. japonicum, now called Erythronium japonicum
- Erythronium dens-canis var. parviflorum, now called Erythronium sibiricum
- Erythronium dens-canis var. sibiricum, now called Erythronium sibiricum

== Uses ==
It is grown as a garden plant for its attractive flowers. It was first introduced to Britain in 1596, with naturalised plants first noted in 1965.

Its leaves may be consumed raw in salad, or boiled as a leaf vegetable. The bulb is also the source of a starch used in making vermicelli.
