= Ik (Berd) =

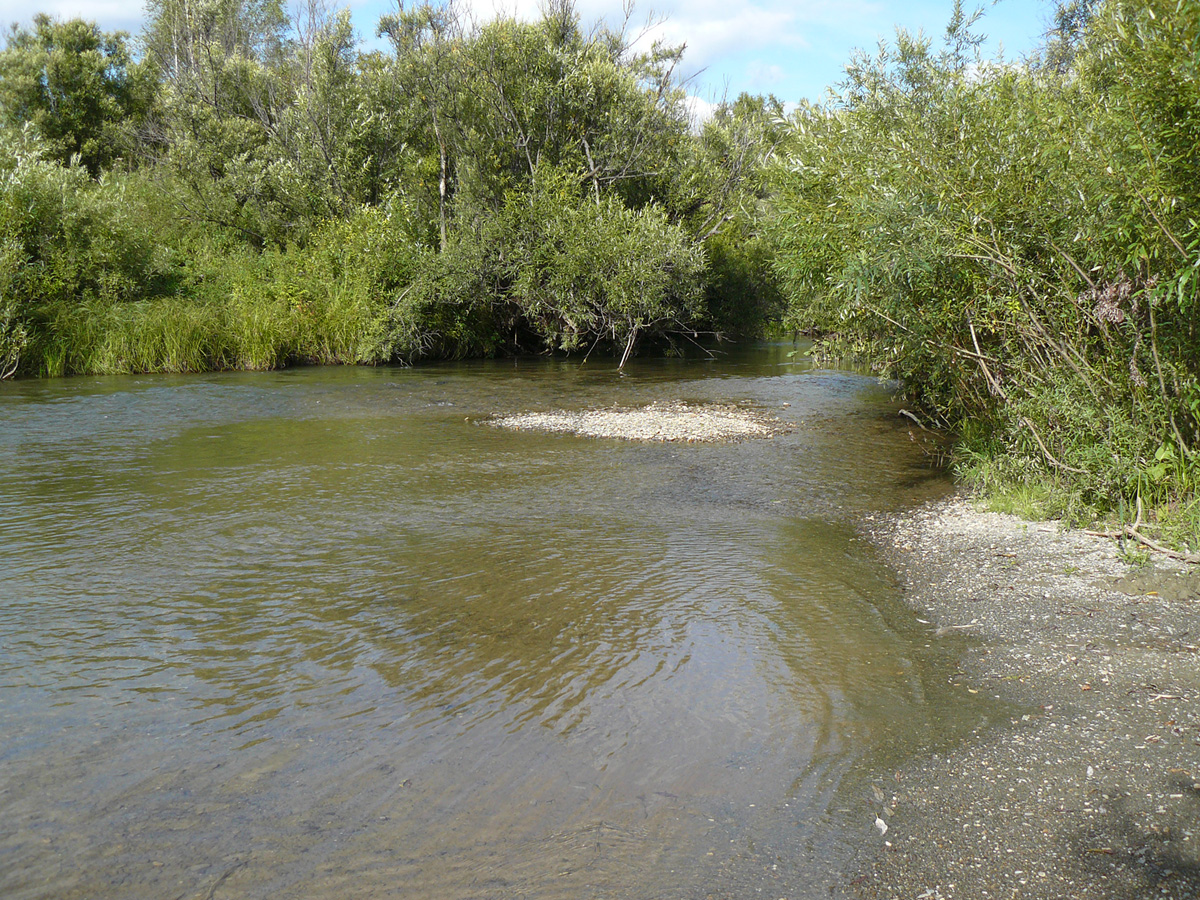
- Native name: Ик (Russian)

Location
- Country: Russia
- Region: Novosibirsk Oblast

Physical characteristics
- Mouth: Berd
  - coordinates: 54°36′55″N 83°56′18″E
- Length: 75 km (47 mi)

Basin features
- Progression: Berd→ Ob→ Kara Sea

The Ik (Russian: Ик) is a river in Toguchinsky, Maslyaninsky and Iskitimsky districts of Novosibirsk Oblast, Russia. Its length is 75 km (47 mi). The river is a tributary of the Berd.

The tributaries of the river are the Kiternya (7 km), Small Ik (8 km), Taradanovka (16 km), Krokhalyovka (23 km), Ashtak (37 km), Big Yelovka (41 km) and Listvyanka (47 km) rivers.

The settlement of Verkh-Iki is situated at the river.
