= Karakan Pine Forest =

Russian national forest in Siberia

Coordinates: 54°28′22″N 82°23′23″E

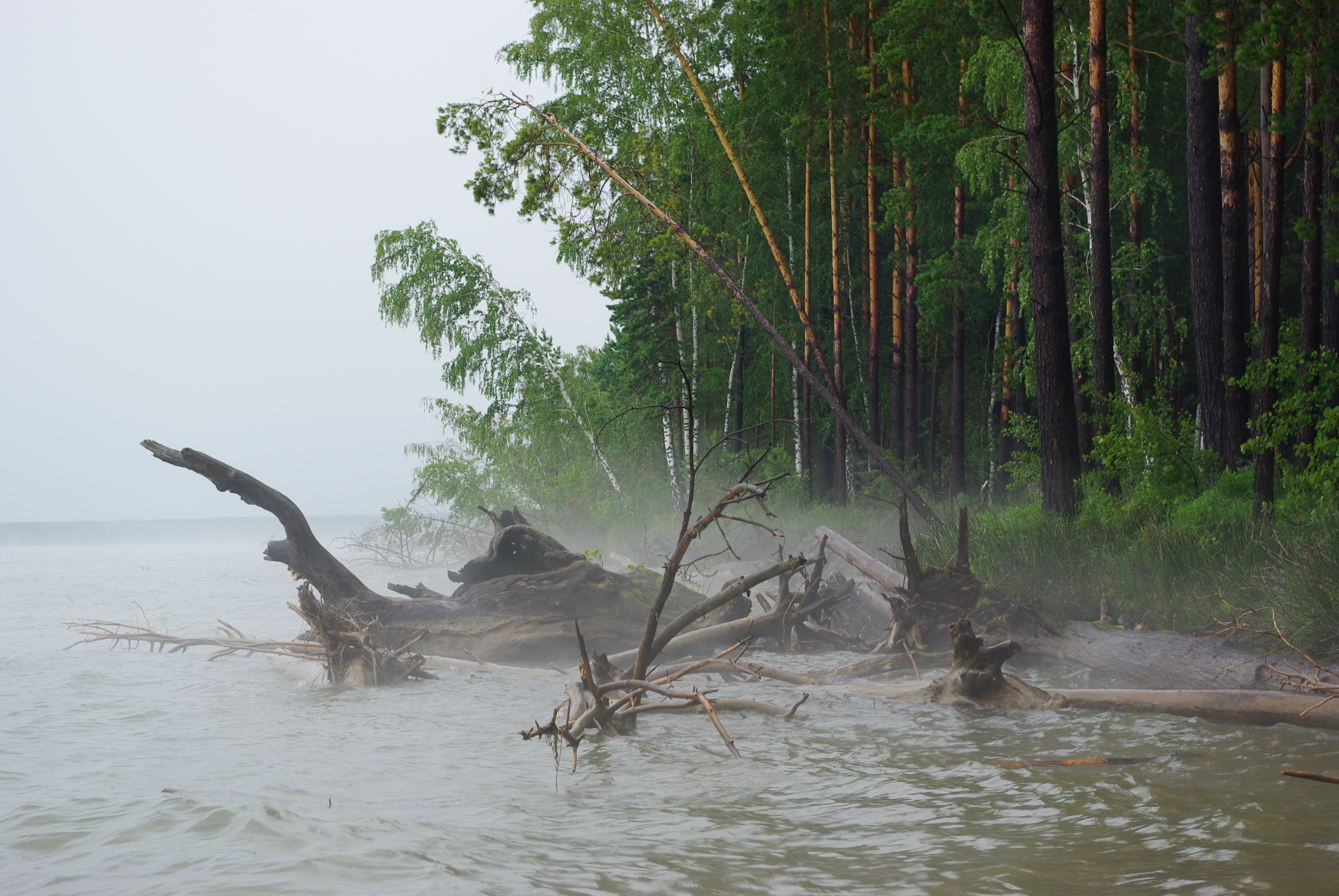
Karakan Pine Forest

The Karakan Pine Forest is a Russian national forest situated in Siberia on the eastern coast of Novosibirsk Reservoir, 70 kilometers south from Novosibirsk center.
