= Anfimov Mocheg =

- Native name: Анфимов Мочег (Russian)

Location
- Country: Russia
- Region: Novosibirsk Oblast

Physical characteristics
- Mouth: Berd
  - coordinates: 54°26′46″N 84°52′59″E
- Length: 14 km (8.7 mi)

Anfimov Mocheg is a river in the Maslyaninsky District of Novosibirsk Oblast that flows into the Berd. Its length is 14 km (8.7 mi).

The tributaries of the river are the Abramov Mocheg and Severny Mocheg.
