= Koyon =

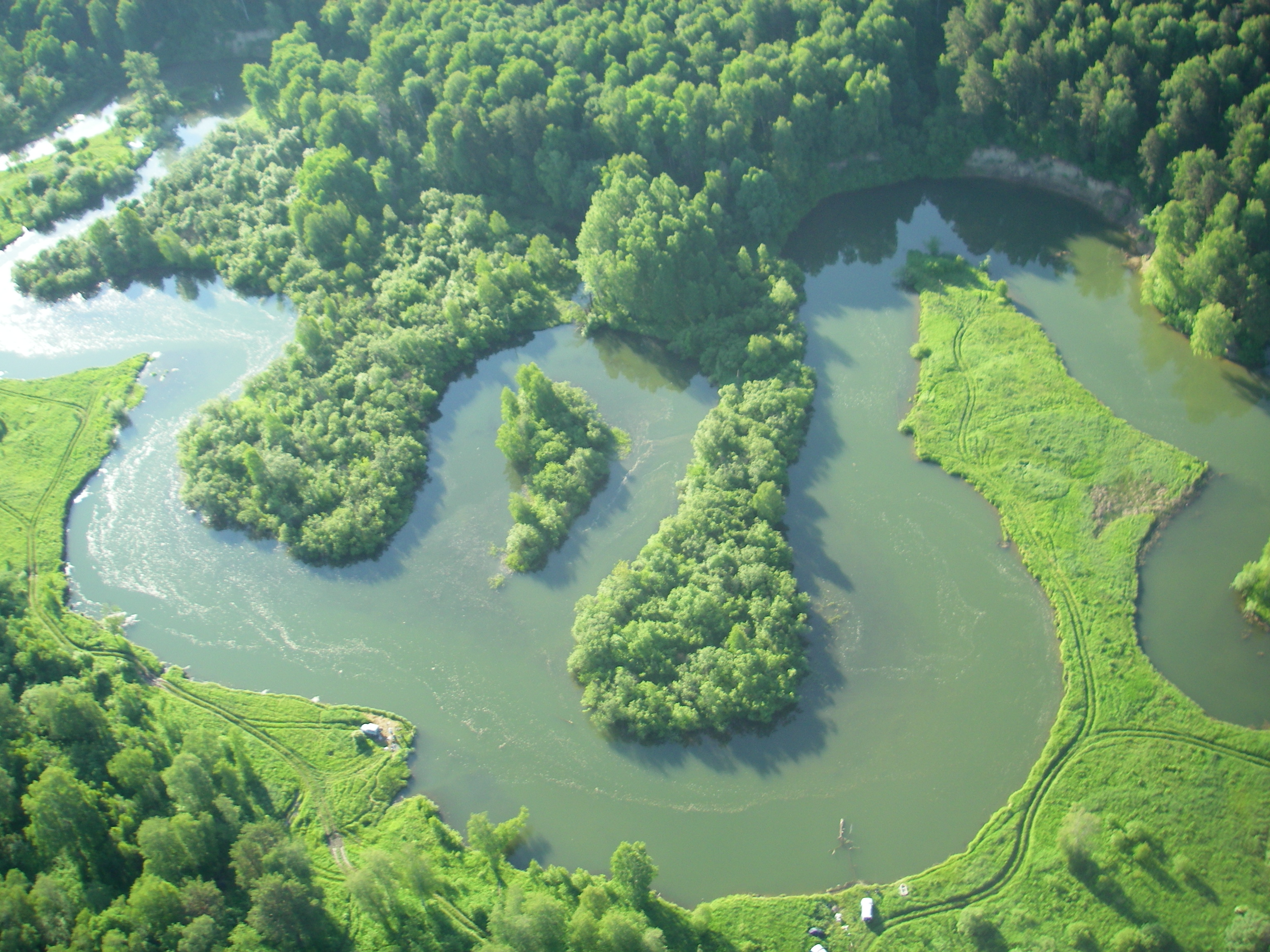
- Native name: Коён (Russian)

Location
- Country: Russia
- Region: Novosibirsk Oblast

Physical characteristics
- Mouth: Berd
  - coordinates: 54°45′35″N 83°13′39″E
- Length: 54 km (34 mi)

Basin features
- Progression: Berd→ Ob→ Kara Sea

The Koyon (Russian: Коён) is a river in Iskitimsky District of Novosibirsk Oblast, Russia. It is a right tributary of the Berd. The length of the river is 54 kilometers (34 mi). By the Koyon lie the settlements of Mikhaylovka, Verkh-Koyon, Nizhny Koyon and Morozovo.

== Gallery ==
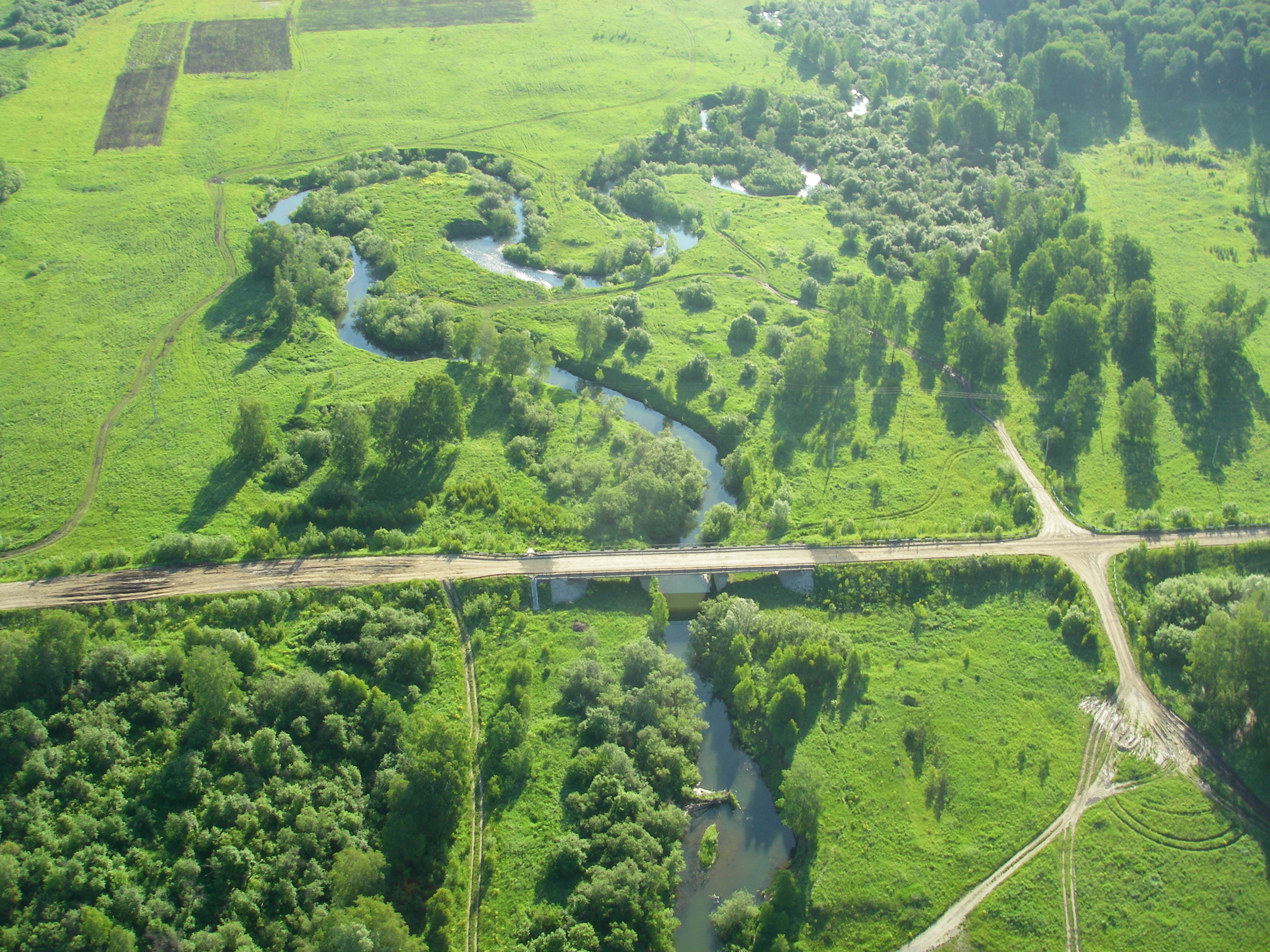
