= Transfiguration Cathedral, Berdsk =

Russian Orthodox church in Berdsk, Russia

Transfiguration Cathedral Преображенский собор
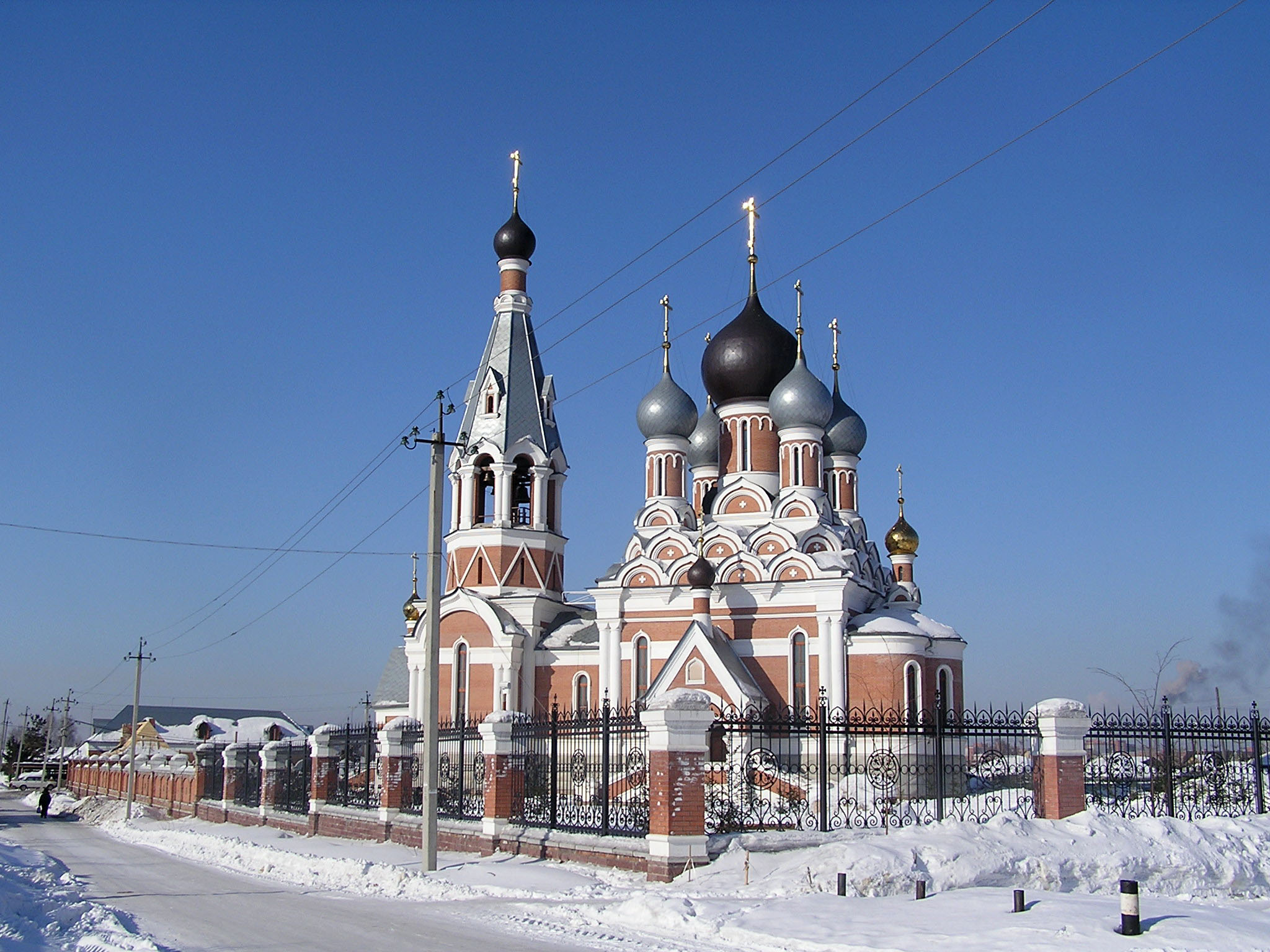

Religion
- Affiliation: Russian Orthodox

Location
- Location: Berdsk
- Interactive map of Transfiguration Cathedral; Преображенский собор
- Coordinates: 54.7518°N 83.0997°E

Architecture
- Architect: P. A. Chernobrovtsev

Transfiguration Cathedral (Russian: Преображенский собор) is a Russian Orthodox church in Berdsk of Novosibirsk Oblast, Russia. Architect: Pyotr Chernobrovtsev. The cathedral is located 10 kilometers south of Novosibirsk.

== History ==
The church was constructed in 1992–2001.

== Graves ==
Archimandrite Macarius (Remorov) and the first Bishop of Novosibirsk and Berdsk Sergius (Sokolov) are buried near the cathedral.
