= Berd Spit =

City park in Novosibirsk Oblast, Russia

Berd Spit Бердская коса (Russian)
- Peninsula
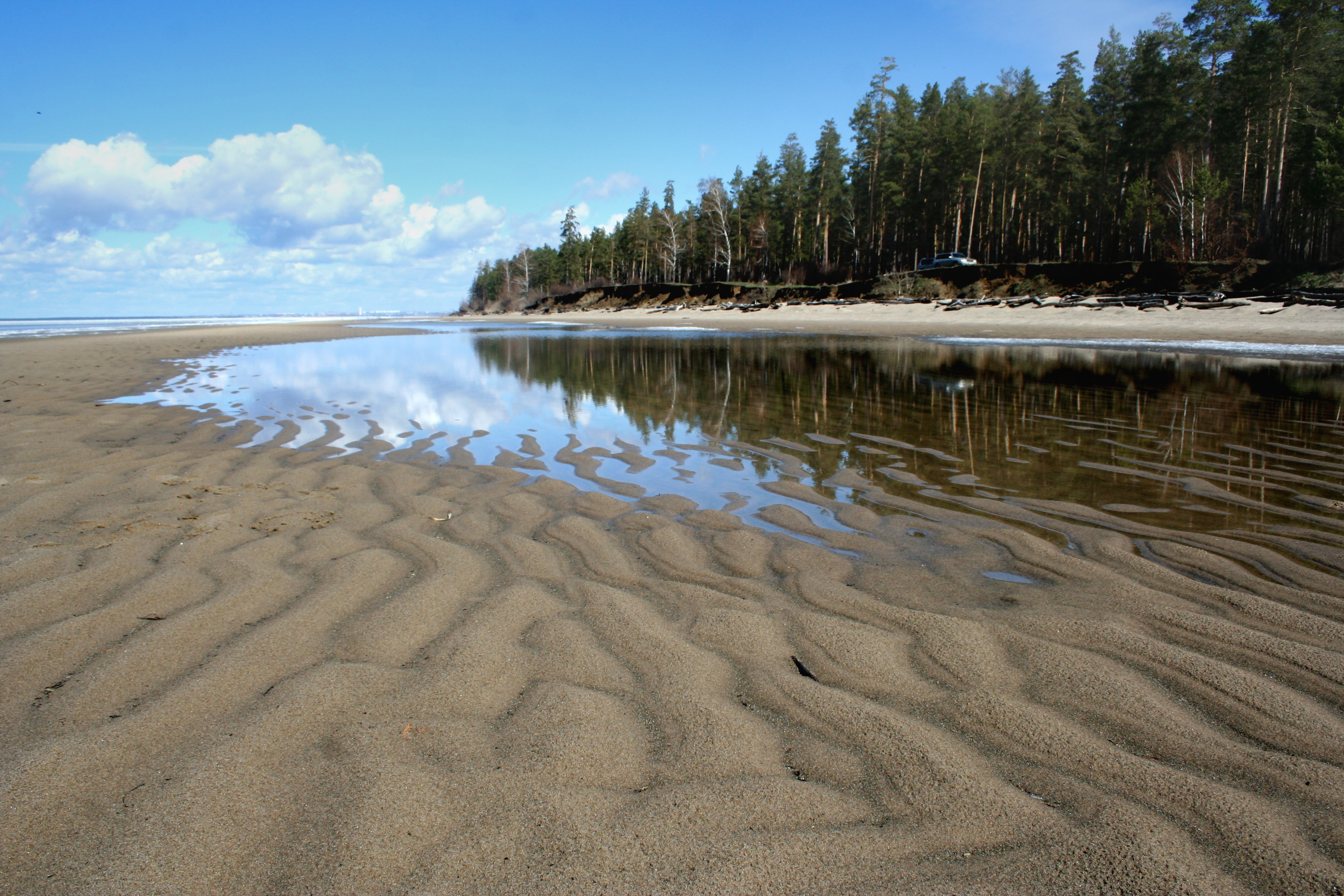
- Interactive map of Berd Spit
- Coordinates: 54°47′58″N 83°03′18″E
- Location: Berdsk, Russia

Berd Spit (Russian: Бердская коса) is a city park in Berdsk of Novosibirsk Oblast, Russia. It is a specially protected natural area since 2006.

== Geography ==
Berd Spit is a peninsula. It is a natural border between Novosibirsk Reservoir and Berd Bay.

== Flora and fauna ==
210 invertebrates, 55 birds, 17 mammals, 4 amphibians, 2 reptiles and 127 plants. 9 animal species and 3 plant species are listed in the Red Data Book of the Novosibirsk Oblast.
