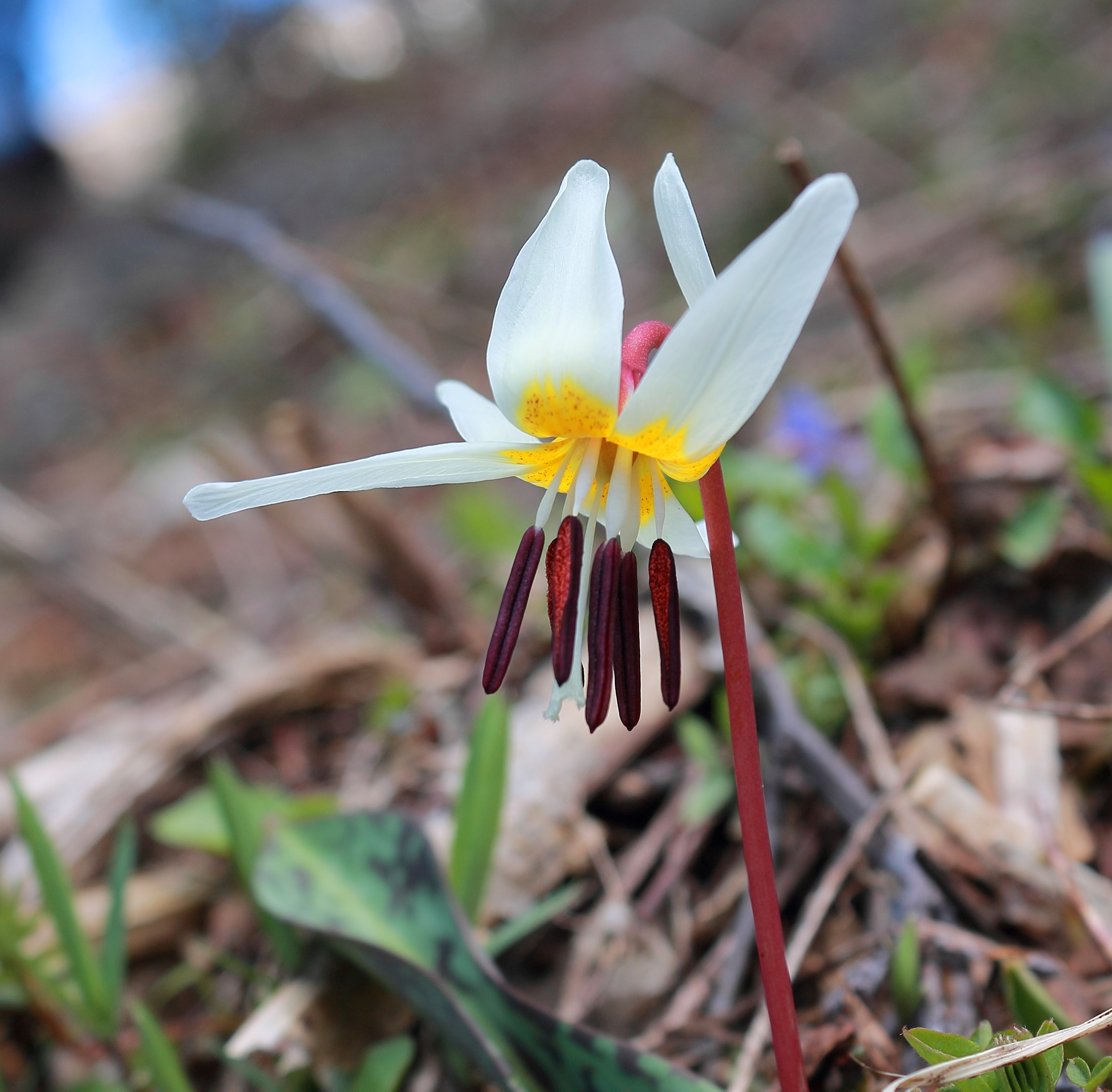

Scientific classification
- Kingdom: Plantae
- Clade: Tracheophytes
- Clade: Angiosperms
- Clade: Monocots
- Order: Liliales
- Family: Liliaceae
- Subfamily: Lilioideae
- Tribe: Lilieae
- Genus: Erythronium
- Species: E. caucasicum

Binomial name
- Erythronium caucasicum Woronow

= Erythronium caucasicum =

Species of flowering plant

Erythronium caucasicum is a bulbous perennial plant in the lily family, native to the western and central Caucasus and the Alborz Mountains in North Iran.

The leaves are spotted. In contrast with its closest relative, Erythronium dens-canis, the anthers are yellow. The petals are usually white or yellowish.
