= Berd Bay =

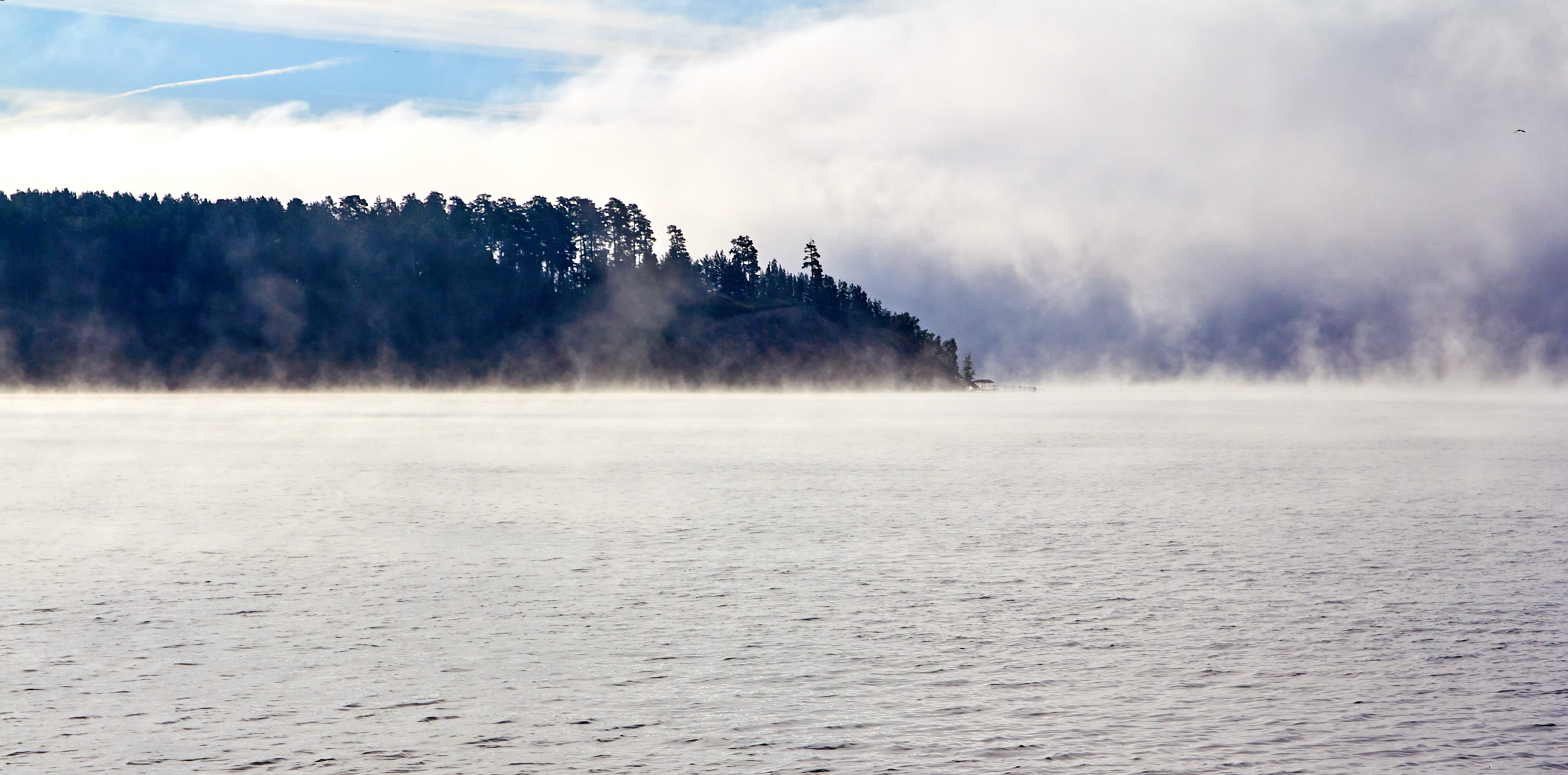

- Location in Russia
- Location: Novosibirsk Oblast
- Coordinates: 54.752°N 83.201°E
- Type: Bay
- Part of: Novosibirsk Reservoir
- Basin countries: Russia
- Max. length: 30 km (19 mi)
- Max. width: 1.5 km (0.93 mi)
- Max. depth: 18 m (59 ft)

Berd Bay is a body of water located between Berd River and Novosibirsk Reservoir. The length of the bay is about 30 km, the average width is 1.5 km, and the maximum depth is 18 m.

== Description ==
The bay was formed during the filling of Novosibirsk Reservoir in 1957–1959.

The right bank is high and covered mainly with pine forest. The left bank is more gently sloping, with arable land; in addition, copses and shrubs are also sometimes found here.

During low-water period, especially in spring, the area of the reservoir decreases sharply.

In the coastal zone and in shallow water there are many old ruins that attract illegal archaeologists with metal detectors.

== Fauna ==
Gulls, grey herons, ducks, Milvus migrans (on August 1, 1995, a gathering of 110–140 black kites was seen here).
