= Iskitim =

Town in Novosibirsk Oblast, Russia

Iskitim Искитим
- Town
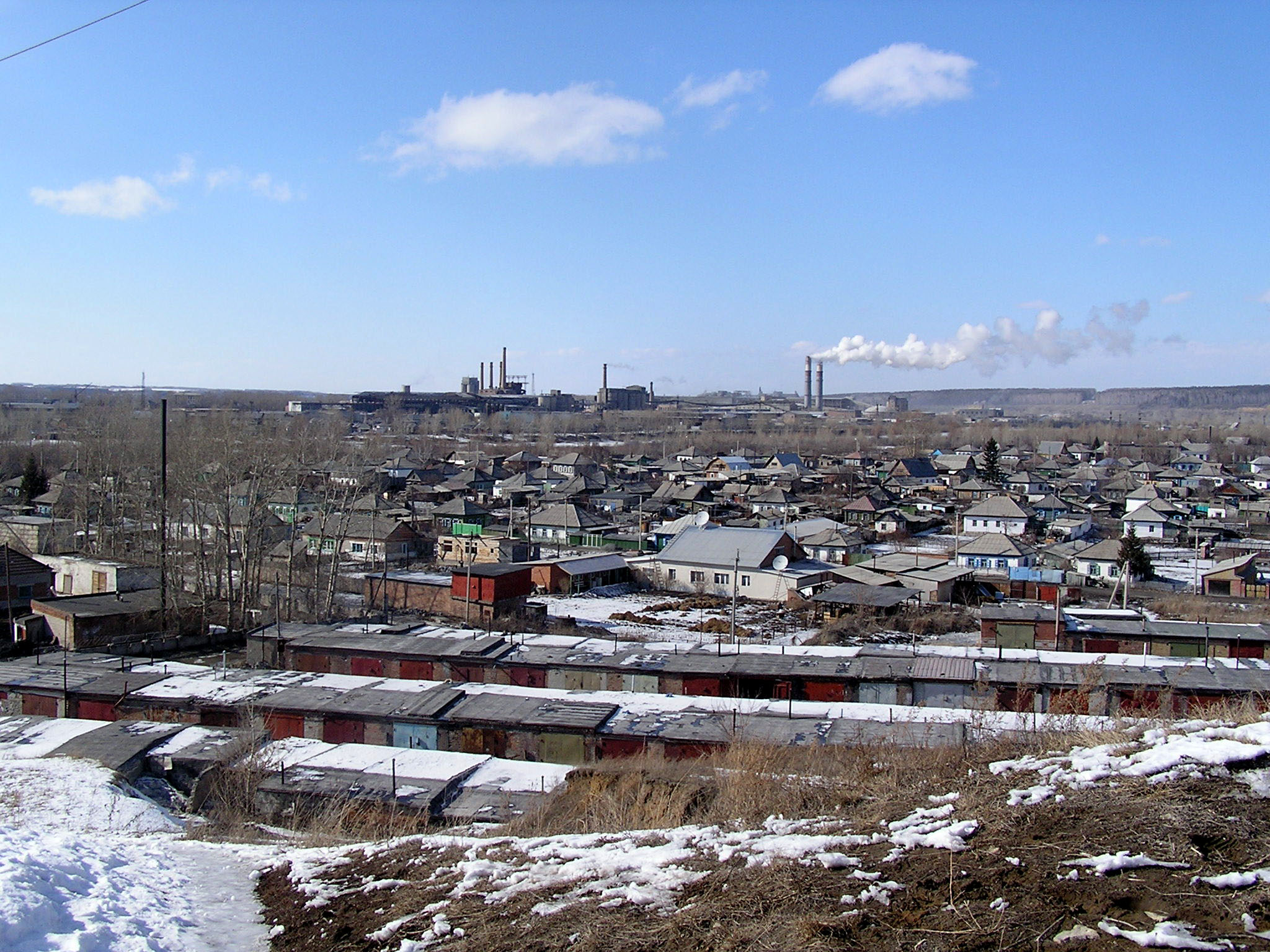
- View of Iskitim

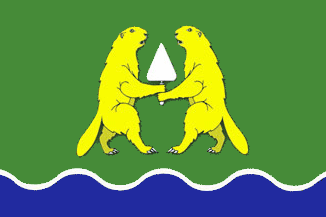
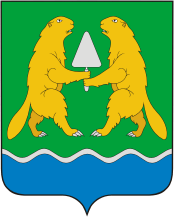
- Flag Coat of arms
- Interactive map of Iskitim
- Location of Iskitim Iskitim (Novosibirsk Oblast)
- Coordinates: 54°38′24″N 83°18′22″E
- Country: Russia
- Federal subject: Novosibirsk Oblast
- Founded: 1717
- Elevation: 140 m (460 ft)

Population (2010 Census)
  - Total: 60,078
  - Estimate (2025): 56,509 (−5.9%)
  - Rank: 273rd in 2010

Administrative status
  - Subordinated to: Town of Iskitim
  - Capital of: Town of Iskitim, Iskitimsky District

Municipal status
  - Urban okrug: Iskitim Urban Okrug
  - Capital of: Iskitim Urban Okrug, Iskitimsky Municipal District
- Time zone: UTC+7 (MSK+4)
- Postal code: 633200–633209
- OKTMO ID: 50712000001
- Website: www.admiskitim.ru

Iskitim (Russian: Искити́м) is a town in Novosibirsk Oblast, Russia, located on the Berd River. Population: 60,078 (2010 census); 62,756 (2002 census); 67,849 (1989 Soviet census).

== History ==
In 1717, four villages were documented on the site of the future city: Koinovo, Shipunovo, Chernodyrovo and Vylkovo.

In 1929, deposits of limestone and shale were found in this place, after which a special commission determined the site for the construction of a cement plant.

In 1933, the working settlement of Iskitim was formed, and the following year the cement plant was built.

In 1938, Iskitim received city status.

In 1994 an area was set aside in the city cemetery for the burial of those who had suffered political repression under the Soviet regime and a commemorative cross was added there.

== Administrative and municipal status ==
Within the framework of administrative divisions, Iskitim serves as the administrative center of Iskitimsky District, even though it is not a part of it. As an administrative division, it is incorporated separately as the Town of Iskitim—an administrative unit with the status equal to that of the districts. As a municipal division, the Town of Iskitim is incorporated as Iskitim Urban Okrug.

== Demographics and crime ==
A large proportion of local population consists of Romani people. The town is also a notorious center of drug trafficking in Siberia.

In 2004–2005, arsons of Roma dwellings took place in Iskitim. Romani people were robbed and driven out of their houses, after which the houses were set on fire. For example, on February 14, 2005, about 10 houses were set on fire. In 2005, a gang of arsonists was caught. However, after their arrest, the arsons of Roma houses continued for some time.

== Industries ==
Iskitim is home to the Chernorechenskii Cement Works and a munitions factory.

== Notable people ==
- Ilya Belous (born 1995), football player
- Ignatiy Lapkin (1939–2026), preacher and sect leader; lived and worked in town for a while
