= Berding =

Berding is a surname. Notable people with the surname include

- Andrew H. Berding (1902–1989), was United States Assistant Secretary of State for Public Affairs from 1957 to 1961
- Franz Berding (1915–2010), German politician
- Helmut Berding (1930–2019), German historian
- Jeff Berding (born 1967), American sports executive and politician

== See also ==
- A. Berding House, historic Carpenter Gothic Victorian style house (California)
