= Berdsk Vega Production Association =

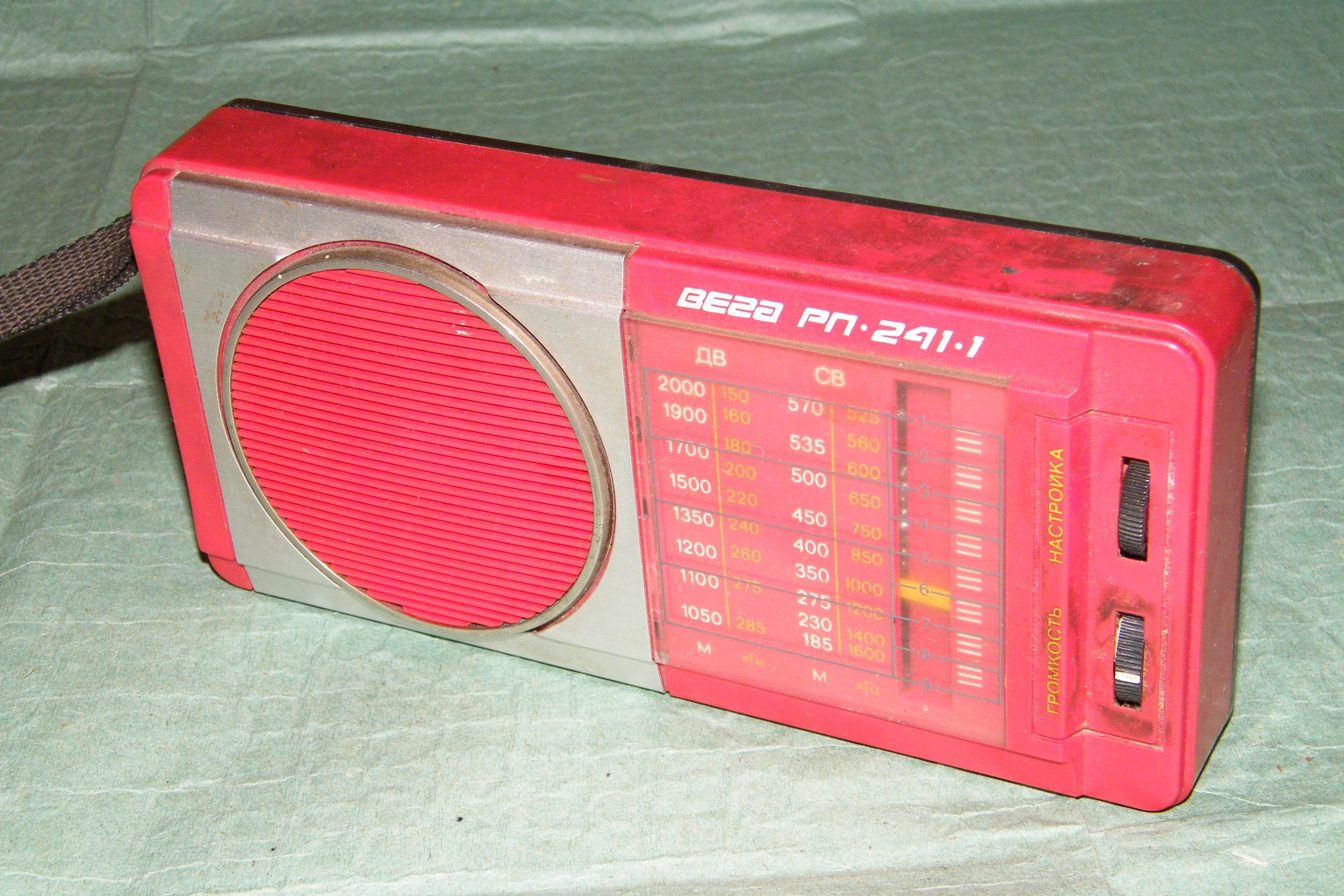
1980s Vega radio receiver

Berdsk Vega Production Association (Russian: Производственное объединение «Вега») is a company based in Berdsk, Russia and established in 1959.

The Berdsk Vega Production Association is one of the largest producers of domestic radios and tape recorders for civil and military use in Russia. Vega includes the Berdsk Radio Plant and its Special Microelectronics Design and Technological Bureau. In the 1990s Vega added compact disc players to its line of stereo electronics.

== Successors ==
The successors of the former production association include:

- LLC "Vega-Arsenal", established in 1991, specializes in the design, development, and production of radio-electronic equipment. The enterprise is located on the premises of the former Vega Production Association.
- "Vega-Sib" Company (full name: Production and Design Bureau "Vega-Sib") was founded in 1994 as a result of the reorganization of the Vega Production Association, based on the radio-electronic equipment development divisions of Vega’s Special Design Bureau (SKB).
- OJSC "BSKB Vega" (Berdsk Special Design Bureau "Vega") is one of the few Russian manufacturers of complex functional electromechanical and radio-electronic devices.
- Scientific and Production Enterprise "Berdsk Radio Receiver Plant" — manufactures consumer radio receivers under the brand name Signal.
