= Berdsk =

Berdsk Бердск
- Town
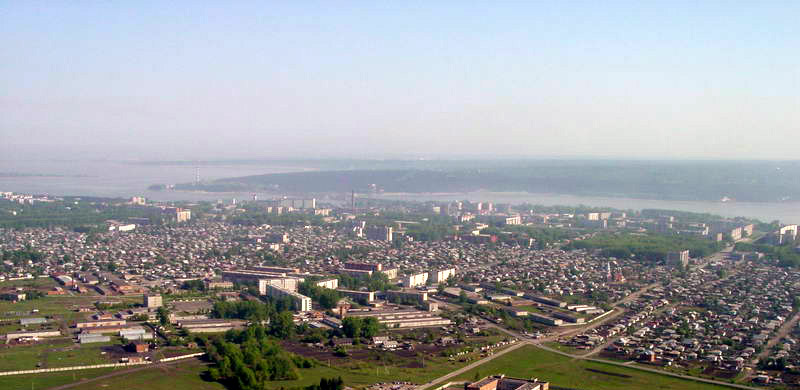
- Panorama of Berdsk

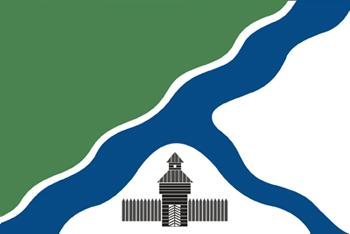
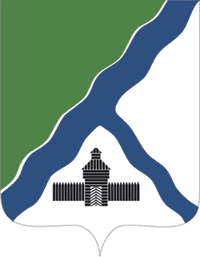
- Flag Coat of arms
- Interactive map of Berdsk
- Location of Berdsk Berdsk (Novosibirsk Oblast)
- Coordinates: 54°45′N 83°06′E
- Country: Russia
- Federal subject: Novosibirsk Oblast
- Founded: 1716
- Town status since: 1944

Government
  - Head: Evgeny Shesternin
- Elevation: 130 m (430 ft)

Population (2010 Census)
  - Total: 97,296
  - Estimate (2025): 101,987 (+4.8%)
  - Rank: 175th in 2010

Administrative status
  - Subordinated to: Town of Berdsk
  - Capital of: Town of Berdsk

Municipal status
  - Urban okrug: Berdsk Urban Okrug
  - Capital of: Berdsk Urban Okrug
- Time zone: UTC+7 (MSK+4)
- Postal code: 633000–633099
- Dialing code: +7 38341
- OKTMO ID: 50708000001
- Town Day: During the first decade of September
- Website: berdsk.nso.ru

Berdsk (Russian: Бердск) is a town and the second largest city in Novosibirsk Oblast, Russia. A suburb of the administrative center, Novosibirsk, it is on the Berd River. In the 2010 Russian census, its population was 97,296 (2010 census).

== Geography ==
Berdsk is on the Berd River. Open land is south of the town and a pine forest covering about 20 square kilometers (7.7 sq mi) is on the west, between Berdsk and the Ob Sea (the Novosibirsk Reservoir).

== History ==
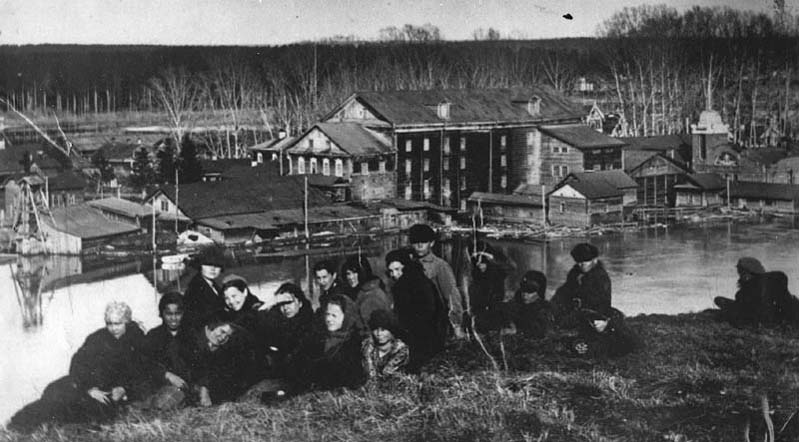
The Gorokhov mill during the 1920s

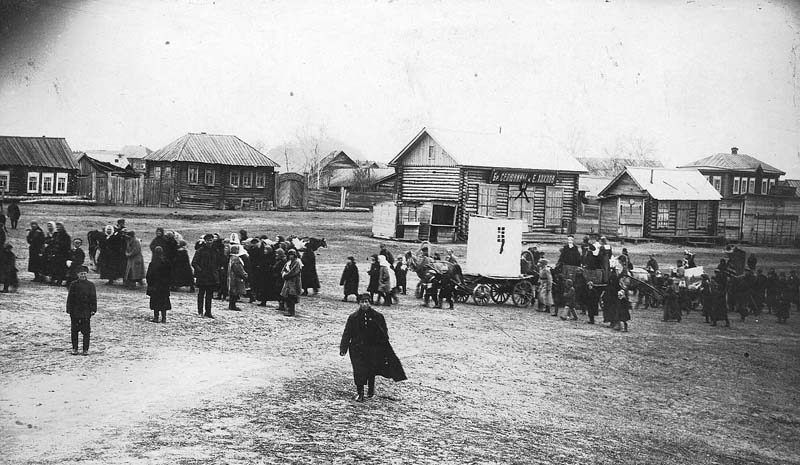
The village center during the 1920s

The migration of Russians into present-day Novosibirsk Oblast began at the end of the 17th century and continued into the 18th century. The Siberian colonists included fugitive peasants escaping Peter the Great's oppression, Old Believers, and hunters in search of furs in the Siberian woods.

By 1715, the Berd River basin had a significant population. The risk of nomad incursions from the south drove the people to demand that the Tomsk regional authorities build a defensive fortress. The fortress, at the confluence of the Berd and Ob rivers, was protected by steep banks on two sides and dense forest on the third side. The Ob river valley could be seen from the banks. The Siberian Route was laid out nearby in 1730, encouraging the development of trade. At the beginning of the 19th century, a small amount of gold washed up from the upper Berd and the Salair Ridge.

By the beginning of the 20th century, Berdsk became a grain-processing center. The local Gorokhov mill produced several types of flour which were distributed throughout Siberia, Russia and Europe via the Kara Sea. The nearby Altai Railway was built in 1915, connecting Novo-Nikolaevsk, Barnaul and Biysk.

Mobilization during World War I and the Russian Civil War which followed the October Revolution reduced Berdsk's population by one-third. The town was an administrative center of the White movement and an underground Bolshevik center. The Soviet collectivization of agriculture ended Siberia's role as an agricultural exporter.

Construction of the Novosibirsk Hydroelectric Station placed the main part of Berdsk in the Novosibirsk Reservoir's flood zone. The town was evacuated several years before the reservoir was filled in 1957–1958, and the area around the railroad station was rebuilt. Bersk's oldest buildings date to 1915, and its streets form a grid. The town was home to a Soviet bioweapons production facility.

== Administrative and municipal status ==
As an administrative division, Berdsk is incorporated as the Town of Berdsk. As a municipal division, the town of Berdsk is incorporated as the Berdsk Urban Okrug.

== Structure and population ==
The town is divided into seven microdistricts. About half the population lives in small private, one-story houses with cold water, electricity and cable radio; the other half lives in recently built municipal housing, some of which has cable TV networks and computer LANs.

Historical population
Year	Pop.	±%
1939	11,000	—
1959	29,021	+163.8%
1970	53,162	+83.2%
1979	67,336	+26.7%
1989	79,252	+17.7%
2002	88,445	+11.6%
2010	96,800	+9.4%
2021	102,850	+6.2%
Source: Census data

== Transportation ==
The R256 highway passes through Berdsk, connecting Novosibirsk with Altai Krai, the Altai Republic and Mongolia. Berdsk has a network of municipal and private bus routes, including intercity routes to Novosibirsk and Iskitim. The town's central railway station has a number of local elektrichkas and long-distance trains to Altai Krai and Kazakhstan. Private river passenger or cargo traffic is negligible, although Berdsk has a pier for sand barges.

== Economy ==
The Berdsk Vega Production Association, founded in 1959, manufactures domestic civilian and military radios, tape recorders and CD players. It and the Berdsk Electromechanical Plant are listed on the Federation of American Scientists' Russian Defense Business Directory.

== Education and culture ==
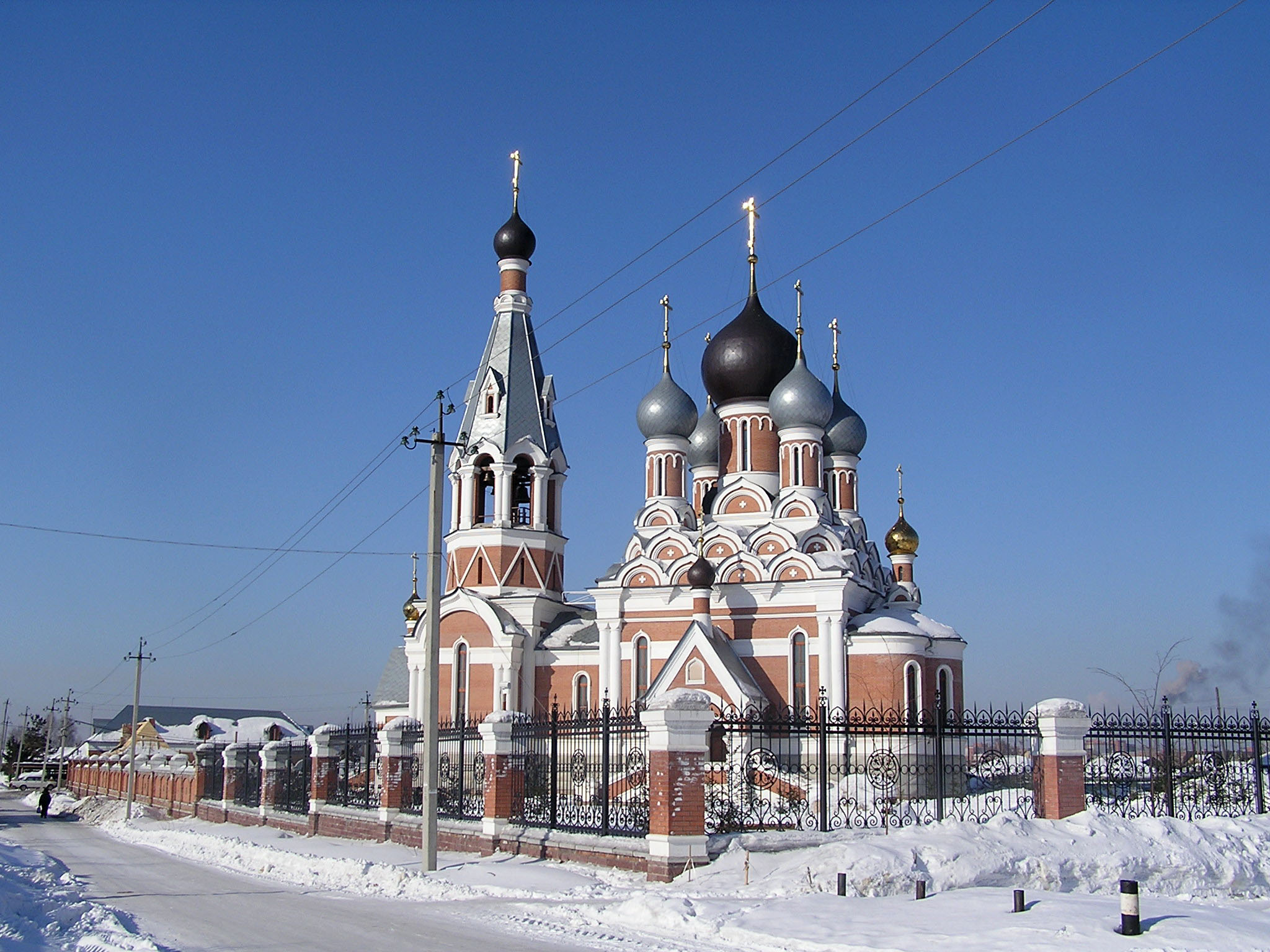
Transfiguration Cathedral, constructed in 2004

Berdsk has about fifteen high schools (the last rebuilt during the 1990s), four trade schools, a secondary school, a lyceum, a management college, a medical secondary school, and several libraries. The town has two palaces of culture. There are three stadiums, five sports schools, a musical school, a museum of history and culture, a park, and a yacht club.

Students enroll in public school at age seven, and graduate eleven years later. Classes are about 40 minutes long. The school day begins at about 8:00 and ends between 12:00 and 14:00, depending on the age of the student. Many students augment their public-school education by attending private, specialized schools after the public-school day ends. Such schools may offer additional training in language, art, or technology.

== Ecology ==
Berd Spit, a city park, has been a protected area since 2006.

== Notable residents ==
- Zakhar Bardakov (born 2001), professional ice hockey player in the NHL
- Irina Kazakevich (born 1997), biathlete
- Artem Ovechkin (born 1986), racing cyclist
