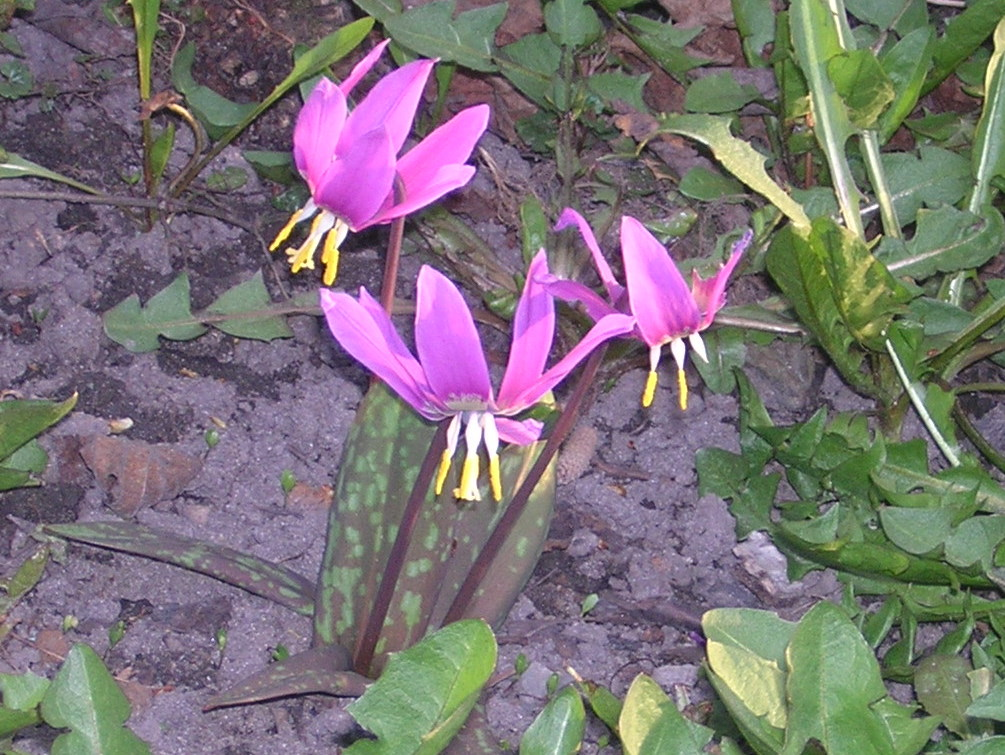

Scientific classification
- Kingdom: Plantae
- Clade: Tracheophytes
- Clade: Angiosperms
- Clade: Monocots
- Order: Liliales
- Family: Liliaceae
- Subfamily: Lilioideae
- Tribe: Lilieae
- Genus: Erythronium
- Species: E. sibiricum

Binomial name
- Erythronium sibiricum (Fisch. et C.A.Mey.) Krylov

= Erythronium sibiricum =

Species of flowering plant

Erythronium sibiricum is a bulbous perennial plant in the lily family Liliaceae, commonly known as the Siberian fawn lily or Siberian trout lily.

== Traits ==
The two basal leaves are often covered with spots. The perigones are between 25 and 70 millimeters long and of a pinkish purple, sometimes white, coloration with a yellow base. The anthers are yellow. Flowering is at the end of April or beginning of May. The number of chromosomes is 2n = 24.

== Distribution ==
Erythronium sibiricum occurs in Siberia (Altay, Tuva, Krasnoyarsk), in Northeastern Kazakhstan and in Northern Xinjiang and Mongolia in the Altai and Sajan mountains. The species inhabits forests, thickets and subalpine meadows at altitudes of 1100 to 2500 meters.

== Systematics ==
This species was first described in 1841 by Friedrich von Fischer and Carl Anton von Meyer as Erythronium dens-canis var. sibiricum. In 1929 Porphyry Nikitic Krylov gave it the species status.
