= Novosibirsk Reservoir =

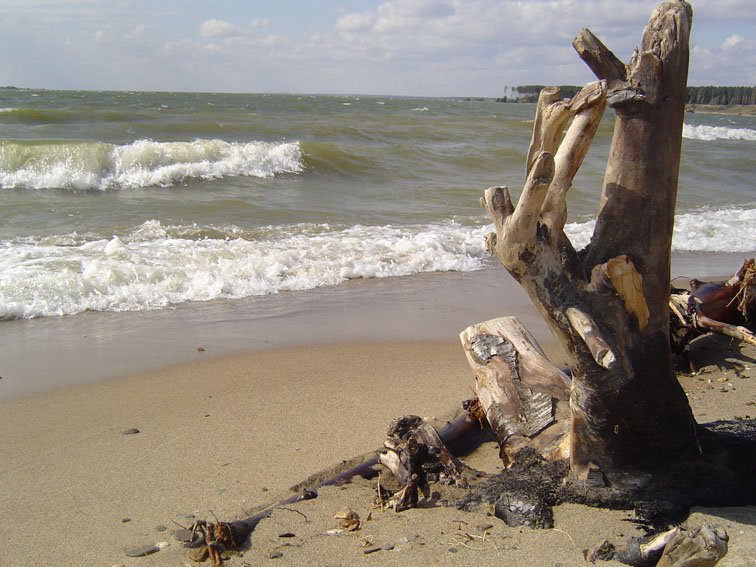
- Interactive map of Novosibirsk Reservoir
- Official name: Новосибирское водохранилище
- Country: Russian Federation
- Location: Novosibirsk Oblast
- Coordinates: 54°50′57″N 82°59′20″E
- Purpose: Power
- Status: Operational
- Construction began: 1950
- Opening date: 1957

Dam and spillways
- Impounds: Ob River
- Height: 33 m (108 ft)

Reservoir
- Total capacity: 8.8 km^{3}
- Surface area: 1,070 km^{2}
- Maximum length: 200 km (124 mi)
- Maximum width: 17 km (10.5 mi)
- Maximum water depth: 25 m

Power Station
- Installed capacity: 460 MW

Novosibirsk Reservoir or Novosibirskoye Reservoir (Russian: Новосиби́рское водохрани́лище), informally called the Ob Sea (Обско́е мо́ре), is the largest artificial lake in Novosibirsk Oblast and Altai Krai, Russian Federation. It was created by a 33 m high concrete dam on the Ob River built in Novosibirsk. The dam, built in 1956, provides a water reservoir for generating hydroelectric power via Novosibirsk Hydroelectric Station.

The reservoir is 200 km long and up to 17 km wide. Its area is 1,070 km^{2} and its volume is 8.8 km^{3} (at normal water level). Its average depth is 8.3 m. The design hydroelectric power output is 460 MW, the average energy production is 1,687 GWh per year. The normal water level (the level of active storage) is 113.5 meters, the maximum water level (the level of flood control storage) is 115.7 meters, the minimum water level (the level of dead storage) is 108.5 meters

The Karakan Pine Forest is situated on the eastern coast of the reservoir, while most of the towns and villages are situated on the western coast. The larger towns bordering the reservoir are Novosibirsk (Akademgorodok quarter, ObGES), Kamen-na-Obi and Berdsk. Berdsk was severely impacted by the reservoir's construction, its historical centre having been submerged by the water. Several smaller villages nearby met with the same fate.

There are several islands in the reservoir, such as Khrenovy Island and Taiwan Island.

== Recreation ==
During the summer, the lake is one of the most popular destinations for Novosibirsk residents, with many yachts and boats dotting the surface, and the beaches teeming with people.
