= Iskitimsky District =

Iskitimsky District Искитимский район
- District
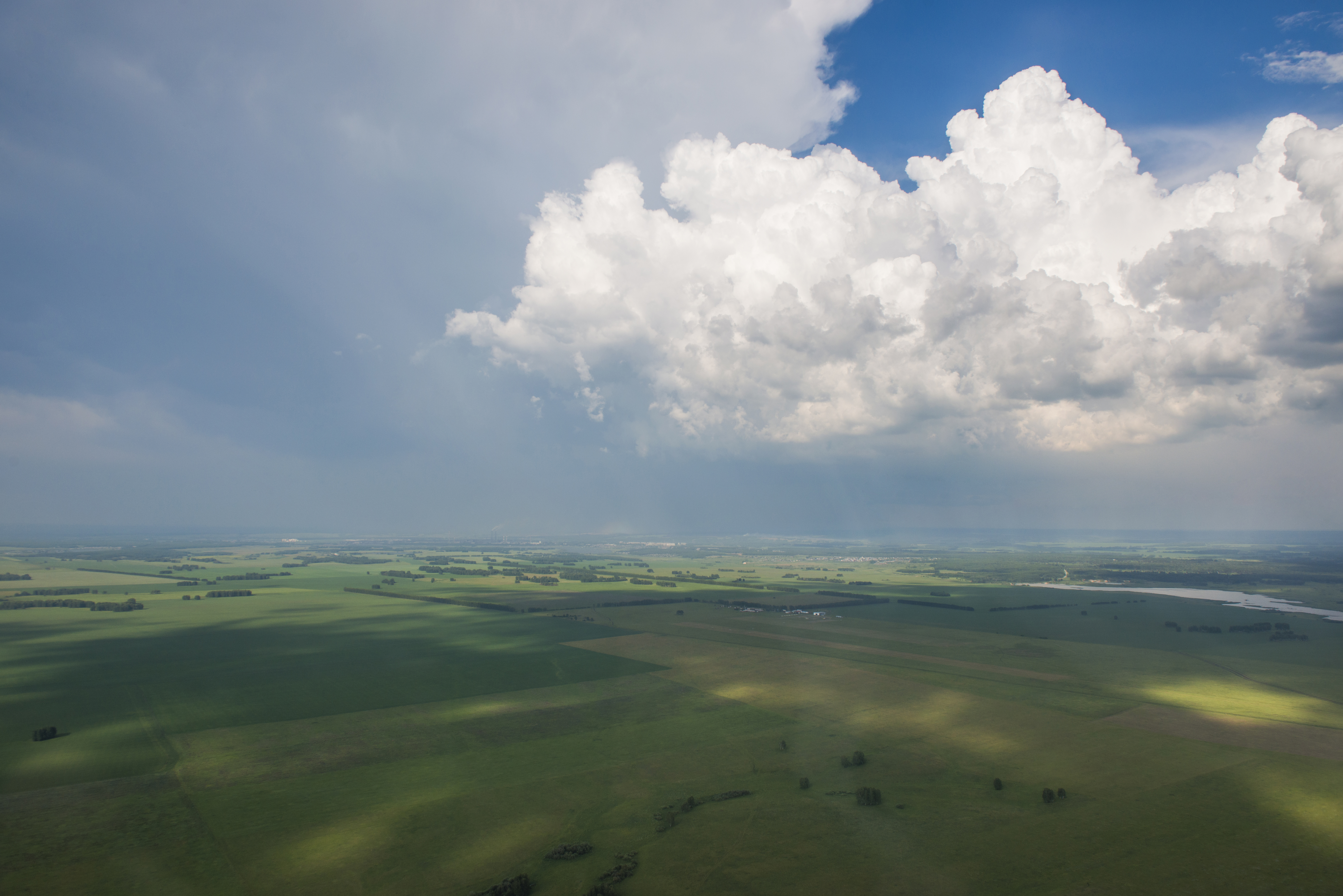

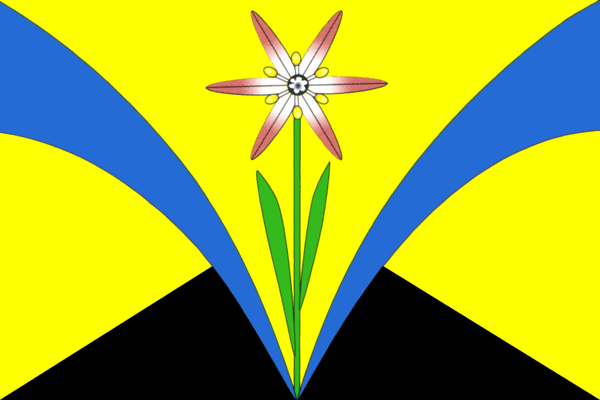
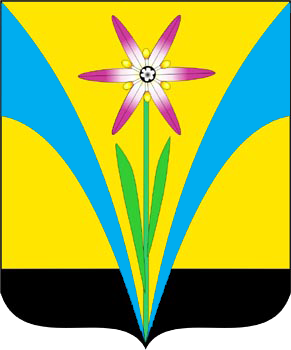
- Flag Coat of arms
- Location of Iskitimsky District in Novosibirsk Oblast
- Coordinates: 54°38′N 83°18′E
- Country: Russia
- Federal subject: Novosibirsk Oblast
- Established: 10 January 1935
- Administrative center: Iskitim

Area
  - Total: 4,384 km^{2} (1,693 sq mi)

Population (2010 Census)
  - Total: 62,816
  - Density: 14.33/km^{2} (37.11/sq mi)
  - Urban: 33.0%
  - Rural: 67.0%

Administrative structure
  - Inhabited localities: 1 urban-type settlements, 71 rural localities

Municipal structure
  - Municipally incorporated as: Iskitimsky Municipal District
  - Municipal divisions: 1 urban settlements, 19 rural settlements
- Time zone: UTC+7 (MSK+4)
- OKTMO ID: 50615000
- Website: http://iskitim-r.ru/

Iskitimsky District (Russian: Искити́мский райо́н) is an administrative and municipal district (raion), one of the thirty in Novosibirsk Oblast, Russia. It is located in the east of the oblast. The area of the district is 4,384 square kilometers (1,693 sq mi). Its administrative center is the town of Iskitim (which is not administratively a part of the district). Population: 62,816 (2010 Census); 66,420 (2002 Census); 67,733 (1989 Soviet census).

== Geography ==
=== Rivers ===
- Koyon River
- Berd River

== Administrative and municipal status ==
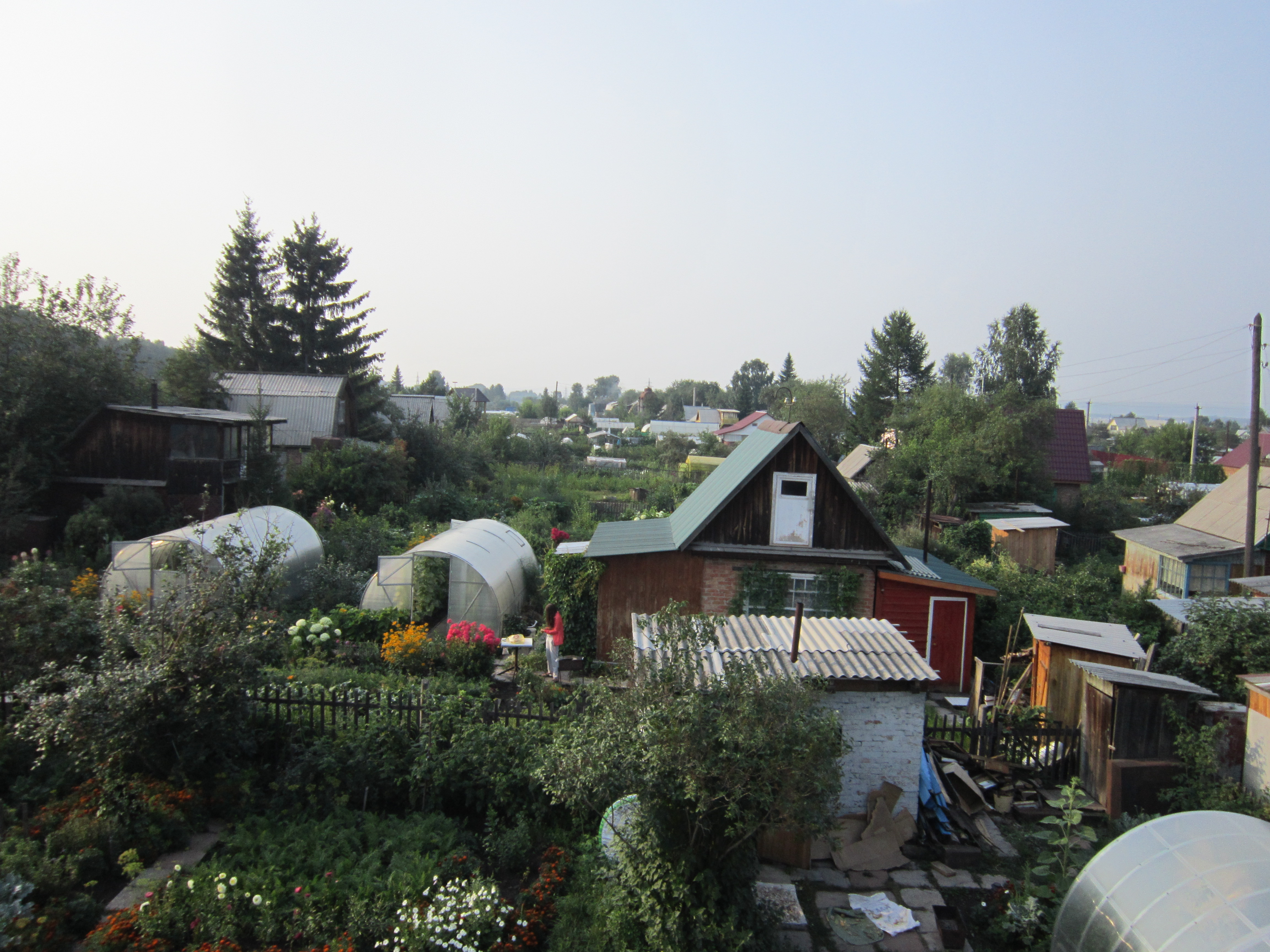
Residential gardens of Iskitimsky District

Within the framework of administrative divisions, Iskitimsky District is one of the thirty in the oblast. The town of Iskitim serves as its administrative center, despite being incorporated separately as an administrative unit with the status equal to that of the districts.

As a municipal division, the district is incorporated as Iskitimsky Municipal District. The Town of Iskitim is incorporated separately from the district as Iskitim Urban Okrug.
