= Berd (river) =

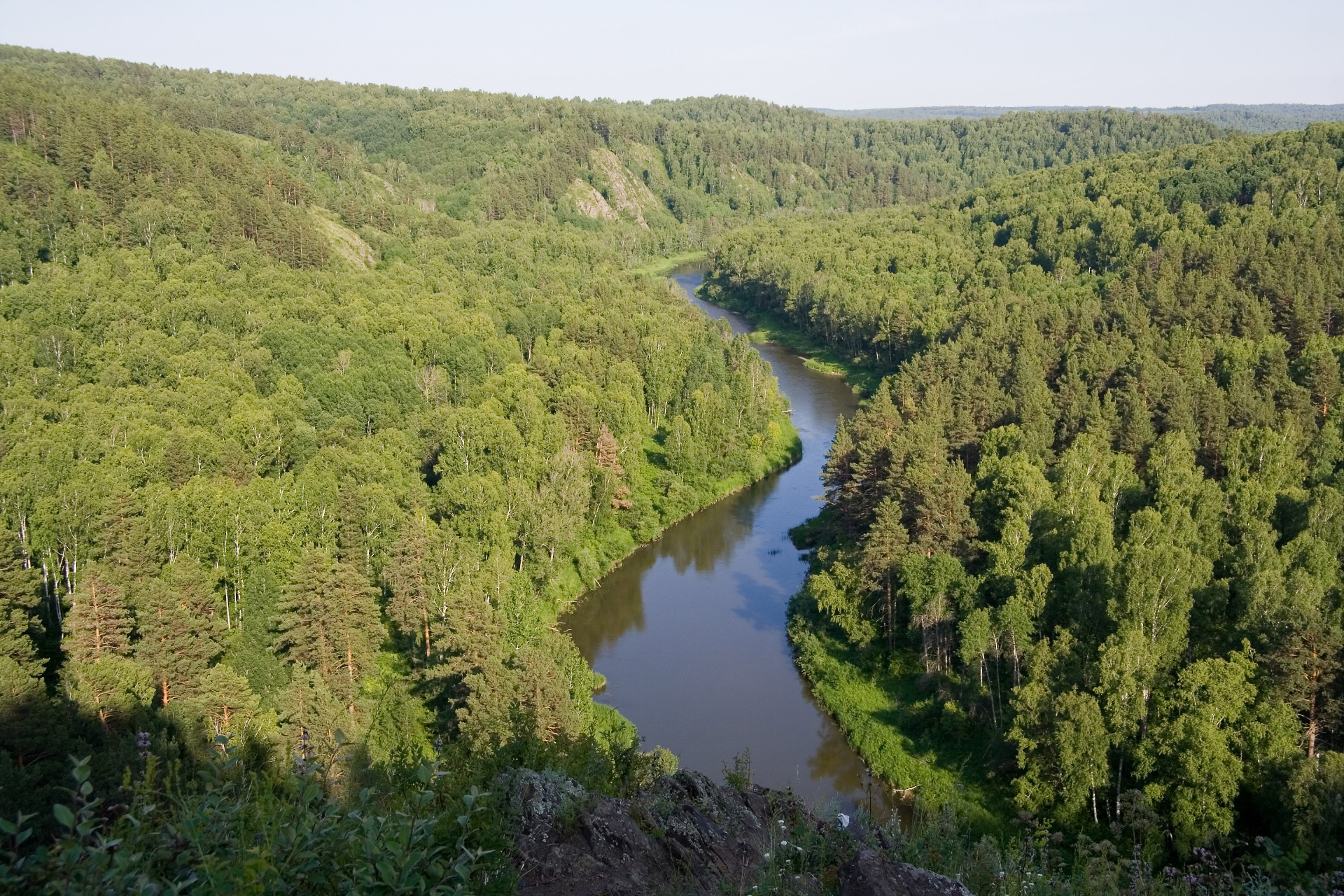
- The Berd flowing through the Berd Rocks

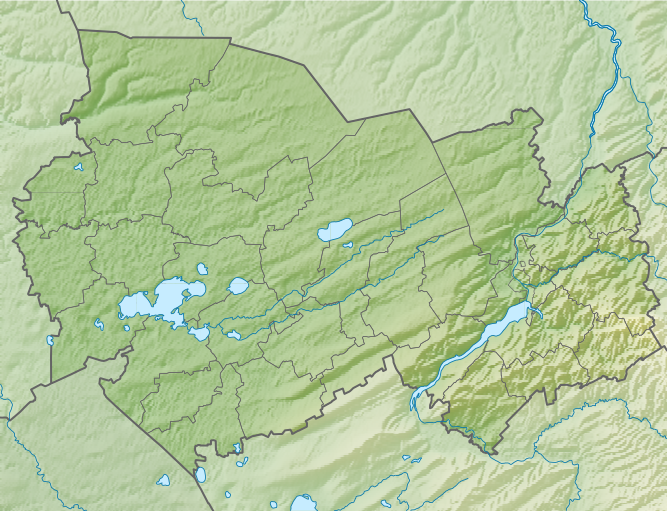
- Mouth location in Novosibirsk Oblast, Russia
- Native name: Бердь (Russian)

Location
- Country: Russia
- Region: Altai Krai, Novosibirsk Oblast

Physical characteristics
- Mouth: Novosibirsk Reservoir
  - coordinates: 54°47′00″N 83°04′10″E
- Length: 363 km (226 mi)
- Basin size: 8,650 km^{2} (3,340 mi^{2})

Basin features
- Progression: Ob→ Kara Sea
- Tributaries
  - right: Ik, Koyon

The Berd (Russian: Бердь) is a river in Russia, a right tributary of the Ob.

The Berd begins on the western slopes of the Salair ridge, flows 30 kilometres (19 mi) in Altai Krai territory and the rest in Novosibirsk Oblast. The river empties into the Novosibirsk Reservoir, which submerged 40 kilometres (25 mi) of the original Berd river after construction.

The Berd is 363 kilometres (226 mi) long and was formerly 416 kilometres (258 mi) long. Its drainage basin covers 8,650 square kilometres (3,340 mi^{2}). The Ik is a tributary flowing into it from the north. Another river flowing into it is the Anfimov Mocheg.

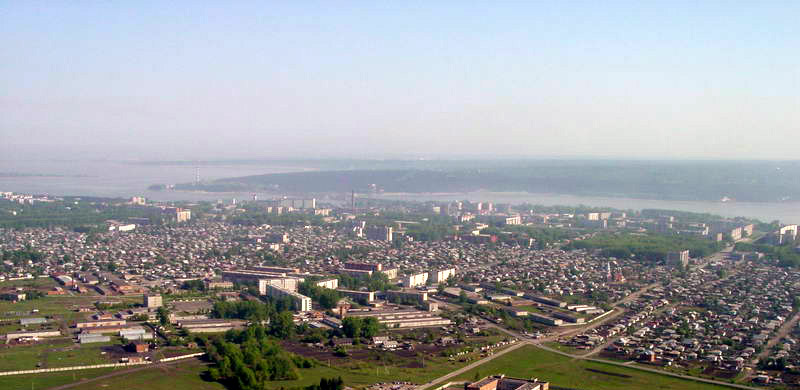
Berd river, the city of Berdsk and the Berdsk gulf

Discharge averages 45.8 cubic metres per second (1,620 cu ft/s). Ice forms on the river in the first weeks of November and breaks apart in mid-April.

Naming, it is thought, is from Turkic languages "Berdi" with the meaning of "given".

Two cities, Berdsk and Iskitim, are along the river.
