= Timeline of Novosibirsk =

The following is a timeline of the history of the city of Novosibirsk, Russia.

== Prior to 20th century ==
- 1893 – Novonikolayevsk settlement developed on former village site during building of Trans Siberian Railway.
  - 30 April -- the first barge of railway workers landed on the right bank of the Ob river.
  - 20 July -- the railway bridge was laid.
- 1894
  - 20 March – Universalny Store opens in the settlement of bridge builders at the mouth of the Kamenka River.
  - November – Railway engineer Grigory Budagov opens a reading room in the settlement.
- 1895
  - Resettlement Center established.
  - The first school opens in the settlement.
  - The first pharmacy established.
- 1896
  - A branch of the Danish company Polizen was opened in the settlement, it was engaged in purchasing and export of butter.
  - 12 August – Ilya Titlyanov becomes the first starosta of the settlement elected by the residents.
- 1897
  - 21 January – Nikolay Litvinov opens the first bookstore.
  - 27 Juny – Volunteer Fire Society established.
  - Bridge built over Ob River.
  - A branch of the Danish company Esmana was opened.
- 1898 – Church of the Prophet Daniel was consecrated near Ob Station.
- 1899
  - Alexander Nevsky Cathedral built.
  - Nikolay Litvinov opens an information office.
- 1900 – Typography of N. P. Litvinov opens.

== 20th century ==
- 1901 – Church of the Protection of the Theotokos was consecrated.
- 1902 – A. A. Pushkaryova opens a pay-library and a reading room in the settlement.
- 1903 – Military Rusk Plant began operating.
- 1904
  - Novonikolayevsk became town (in 1903 according to the Julian calendar).
  - 30 November -- establishment of urban public administration.
  - Novonikolayevsk City Police Department formed (in 1903 according to the Julian calendar).
  - Infectious Diseases Hospital established.
  - Trud Plant founded.
- 1905
  - 20 May – A lying-in strike took place at the Novonikolayevsk pier, in which 340 dockworkers took part. They demanded wage increase and an 8-hour working day. All the conditions of the protesters were met late in the evening of the same day.
  - Juny – The strike of 500 workers of the Ob railway station for higher wages. The results of the action are unknown.
  - Autumn – Society of Clerks established.
  - The International Harvester Company opens its representative office in the city.
- 1906
  - May – South Altai Flour Milling Company in business.
  - 29 May – Yasli orphanage opens for 100-120 children of both sexes.
  - 6 July – The first 17 kerosene lanterns for night lighting appeared in the city.
  - First bank opens.
  - Narodnaya Letopis newspaper begins publication.
  - Telephone service was established at the initiative of the Volunteer Fire Society of Novonikolalayevsk.
- 1907
  - 21 February – Old Believer community officially registered in the city.
  - 1 March – Obskoy Rabochy illegal newspaper of the Ob group of the RSDLP begins publication.
  - 1 April – Sibirskaya Rech newspaper begins publication.
  - 16 May – Ob newspaper begins publication.
  - June – Soldatsky Listok illegal newspaper begins publication.
  - 15 July – Reading Room named after Anton Chekhov opens with free admission.
  - December – Novonikolayevsk Exchange Society opens.
- 1908
  - 15 August – Fedot Makhotin opens the first stationary cinema.
  - 21 January – Zakamenskaya Church was consecrated.
- 1909
  - Novonikolayevsk Fire.
  - Obskaya Zhizn newspaper begins publication.
  - St. Casimir's Roman Catholic Church was consecrated.
  - A branch of the Russian Bank for Foreign Trade opens.
  - February — Novonikolayevsk Police caught a gang of counterfeiters.
  - 21 February – The Novonikolayevsk branch of the Union of the Russian People formed.
- 1910
  - Sibirsky Kommersant newspaper begins publication.
  - Novonikolayevsk waterbus begins operating.
  - 31 August – Pyotr Stolypin's visit to Novonikolayevsk where he visited a resettlement center, a voluntary firefighter society, a cholera barrack, a prison, a city hospital and a rural hospital.
- 1911
  - 2 September – A document appeared in the journal of the Novonikolayevsk City Duma required city residents to plant deciduous trees near their households. Trees should be planted in one row on the streets of 10 sazhens wide (1½ sazhens from the building), in two rows on the streets of 15 (2 sazhens from the building for the first row, 3½ sazhens from the building for the second row) and 25 sazhens wide (9½ sazhens from the building for the first row, 11 sazhens from the buildings for the second row). Violation of the rules of this document, as well as damage to trees, entailed legal liability. The execution of the order was monitored by police officers.
  - Novonikolayevsk Seminary opens.
- 1912
  - Distillery No.7 began operating.
  - Ekonomia Consumer Society in business.
  - Market Square opens in Zakamensky District after repeated requests from residents of this district to open it.
- 1913
  - Population: 62,967.
  - Construction of Military Townlet was completed.
  - Smallpox epidemic.
  - 20 January – Sibirskaya Nov newspaper begins publication.
  - 6 May – Department of the Society for the Study of Siberia and the Improvement of Its Life opens.
- 1914
  - 6–9 March – The first exhibition of field, grass and garden seeds was organized in the city. 16 types of wheat, 11 types of oats, 3 types of barley and 2 types of rye as well as some types of field herbs were presented at the event.
  - 18–22 July – Milan Opera from Italy performs in Novonikolayevsk. Soloists, choir and orchestra under the direction of the Gonzalez brothers performed the operas Rural Honor, Troubadour, La Traviata, Faust and Carmen.
  - Commercial Assembly Building was constructed.
- 1915
  - 5 May – The City Duma sets the price level for bread and meat, which were forbidden to sell above the maximum allowed price.
  - Chapel of St. Nicholas built.
- 1916
  - 17 August – Golos Sibiri newspaper begins publication.
  - The Union of Siberian Cooperative Unions (The Zakupsbyt) was founded.
  - Sugar Riot
- 1917
  - 1 February – Novonikolayevsk City Public Bank opens.
  - July – Znamya Svobody newspaper begins publication.
  - December – Soviets in power.
- 1918
  - January – Novonikolayevsk Union of Worker Cooperation established.
  - Soap Factory founded.
  - Delo Revolyutsii newspaper begins publication.
- 1920
  - Spring – Novonikolayevsk City Council of Workers', Peasants' and Red Army Deputies established.
  - 5 August – Central Folk Museum of Novoniklolayevsk (future Novosibirsk Local History Museum) opens on Kommunisticheskaya Street 19.
  - Scientific Medical Society founded.
- 1921
  - 5 September – Professionalnoye Dvizhenie magazine begins publication.
  - The city becomes seat of the Novonikolayevsk Governorate.
  - Avtomat Sewing Factory established.
- 1922
  - 5 January – Day of Help for a Hungry Child was held in Novonikolayevsk.
  - 17 January – Felix Dzerzhinsky's visit.
  - 1 March – 14 April – Martial law was introduced in the city due to a wave of banditry.
  - 22 March – Sibirskiye Ogni literary magazine begins publication.
  - 1 April – Radio communication established between Moscow and Novonikolayevsk.
  - 1 May – Free lunches for children were organized in honor of the holiday.
  - Monument to the Heroes of the Revolution unveiled.
  - The first football team named Pechatnik appears in the city. It was organized by the proofreader A. L. Timiryayev and the former assistant commissar of the regiment A. Polsky. Since 1922, football matches have been held continuously.
- 1923
  - February – Usage of books becomes free in city libraries.
  - 15 May – City-wide meeting and demonstration of protest against the ultimatum of Lord Curzon to the Soviet Government.
  - July – Novosibirsk bus system begins operating.
  - December
    - Novonikolayevsk Dermatovenerologic Dispensary founded.
    - The rise in armed robberies in the city. Criminal Investigation Department was able to catch several gangs operating at night.
    - Macaroni Factory begins operating at Mill No.1.
  - German Consulate established.
- 1924
  - January – Polish school opens on Irkutskaya Street.
  - 30 July – Uchyoba i Vospitanie military-political journal begins publication.
  - 5 December – Yuny Leninets newspaper begins publication.
  - Polish Consulate established.
- 1925
  - September – Sibir magazine begins publication.
  - Central Park, Novosibirsk established.
  - Lenin Building constructed on Krasny Prospekt.
  - City becomes capital of the Siberian Krai.
  - Novonikolayevsk Verification Chamber of Weights and Measures No. 12 founded.
  - Okhotnik Altaya hunting and fishing magazine relocates to Novonikolayevsk.
- 1926
  - City renamed "Novosibirsk."
  - Population: 120,128.
  - Sibkraisoyuz, Sibrevcom and Textilsindikat buildings were constructed.
  - Taisneiba Latgalian-language newspaper begins publication.
  - The first quarter of the year – the Criminal Investigation Department identified 140 brothels in the city that provided sex services and sold drugs.
  - 1 April – The AKKORT Joint-Stock Company in business.
  - June 21 – A major fire in the center of Novosibirsk.
  - November 7 – Sibrevcomovsky Bridge was opened.
- 1927
  - July – Construction of a water transportation and sewage system began in the city.
  - Spartak Stadium opens.
  - Statue of Lenin unveiled on Barnaul Street.
  - Na Leninskom Puti magazine begins publication.
- 1928
  - 18–21 January – Joseph Stalin's visit to the city.
  - March – a major demonstration against beer parlors and the sale of vodka.
  - Sibir Knitwear Factory established.
  - Business House built.
- 1929 – Sibselmash established.
- 1930
  - 10 July – Theater of the Young Spectator opens.
  - City becomes capital of the West Siberian Krai.
  - City Clinical Hospital No. 1 founded.
  - Zaobsky District was formed.
  - Novosibirsk Research Institute of Hygiene established.
- 1931
  - 1 July – Novosibirsky Rabochy newspaper begins publication.
  - Komsomolsky Railway Bridge built.
  - Opening of the Mochischche Road to the quarry, which was located north of the city (current Zayeltsovsky District). After its opening, the productive capacity of the quarry reached 200 thousand tons of stone per year.
  - Stankosib Plant established.
- 1932
  - National Bank building constructed.
  - Siberian State Transport University opens.
- 1933
  - Dzerzhinsky District was established.
  - Novosibirsk Regional Puppet Theatre founded.
- 1934
  - Novosibirsk tram begins operating.
  - Bars Fur Factory established.
- 1935
  - Marketplace area officially named Stalin Square, Novosibirsk
  - Tomsk Railway Residential Building was constructed.
  - Novosibirsk Electromechanical Plant established.
  - Novosibirsk State Pedagogical Institute founded.
- 1936
  - Football Club Sibir Novosibirsk formed.
  - Novosibirsk Agricultural Institute opens.
  - Technical School of Soviet Trade established.
- 1937
  - City becomes part of Novosibirsk Oblast.
  - Novosibirsk State Philharmonic Society founded.
  - 100-Flat Building was constructed.
  - Sibtekhgaz Plant for the production of gases and gas mixtures established.
  - Severyanka Sewing Factory founded.
- 1938
  - The first state taxis appeared in the city. The fare was 1 ruble 40 kopecks per kilometer.
- 1939
  - Novosibirsk military infantry school established.
  - Novosibirsk Regional Clinical Hospital opens.
  - Population: 405,589.
- 1940 – Zayeltsovsky District was formed.
- 1941
  - 30 April – The first tram route was opened on the left bank of the city, it worked from 5 am to 2 am. Prior to this, the tram operated only on the right bank.
  - Zayeltsovskoye Cemetery established.
  - Chaplygin Siberian Scientific Research Institute Of Aviation founded.
  - Elektrosignal, Tochmash, Instrument-Building, Refinery plants established.
  - NIIIP evacuated to Novosibirsk.
- 1942
  - 9 July – Symphony Orchestra of the Leningrad Philharmonic performed Dmitri Shostakovich's Seventh Symphony at the Stalin Club. At this time, Shostakovich was listening to his work in the auditorium of the club.
  - Novosibirsk Thermal Power Plant 3 started operating.
  - Chocolate, Cartographic, Film Copy factories were founded; Luch Plant established.
- 1943
  - Novosibirsk TB Research Institute established.
  - Institute of Systematics and Ecology of Animals founded.
  - Institute of Mining opens.
  - Inskoy Technical School of Railway Transport established.
- 1944
  - 8 February – West Siberian Branch of the Academy of Sciences of the Soviet Union established.
  - Siberian Scientific Research Institute of Metrology and Chemical and Metallurgical Institute established.
  - Sewing Technical School of the People's Commissariat of Light Industry founded.
  - Electric Locomotive Repair Plant put into operation.
- 1945
  - Novosibirsk Opera and Ballet Theatre building opens.
  - City Lecture Bureau organized.
  - Sibelektroterm established.
- 1946
  - 18 May – Novosibirsk Department of the All-Union Geographical Society formed.
  - Central Siberian Botanic Garden established.
  - Novosibirsk Research Institute of Traumatology and Orthopedics was created.
- 1947
  - Novosibirsk Zoo founded.
  - Repair and Mechanical Plant established.
- 1948 – Novosibirsk House of Models established.
- 1950
  - Novosibirsk Electrotechnical Institute established.
  - Confectionery shop opens on Krasny Prospekt selling products from Moscow, Leningrad and local factories.
  - Uzlovaya Hospital at the Inskaya railway station opens.
- 1951
  - 15 May – Novosibirsk Institute of Water Transport Engineers established.
- 1952
  - Large Novosibirsk Planetarium opens in Central Park.
  - Kleschchikhinskoye Cemetery established.
  - Novosibirsk Industrial Technical School founded.
- 1953
- April – House of Culture named after Zhdanov opens.
  - NPO ELSIB founded.
  - Gusinobrodskoye Cemetery established.
- 1954
  - Ekran Plant established.
  - A cafe with automatic serving of dishes has opened in the city. It had 20 vending machines.
- 1955
  - Kommunalny Bridge built.
  - Leninsky Market opens.
  - Power Machine-Building Plant established.
- 1956
  - Novosibirsk Conservatory established.
  - Novosibirsk State Choreographic School was created.
  - Stroitel House of Culture built in Levyie Chyomy (current ObGES Microdistrict).
  - Nikita Khrushchev's first visit to the city.
- 1957
  - 20 May – 192-meter high TV tower was installed on the left bank of Novosibirsk.
  - 7 August – The first broadcast of a local TV program took place.
  - Reinforced Concrete Plant No.1 put into operation.
  - Palace of Culture named after M. Gorky and House of Culture named after A. Popov were built.
  - Vecherniy Novosibirsk established.
  - Novosibirsk trolleybus begins operating.
  - Siberian Branch of the Russian Academy of Sciences established.
  - Novosibirsk Reservoir created near the city.
- 1958
  - Sovetsky District was formed.
  - Institute of Economics and Organization of Industrial Production established.
  - Institute of Organic Chemistry and Institute of Catalysis founded.
  - Fonyakov's Literary Association established.
- 1959
  - Novosibirsk Capacitor Plant was commissioned.
  - Budker Institute of Nuclear Physics was founded.
  - Novosibirsk State University established.
  - Novosibirsk Theatre of Musical Comedy established in Central Park.
  - Population: 885,045.
  - Development of science town Akademgorodok begins near city.
  - Fox domestication experiment.
  - July 28 – Future US President Richard Nixon visited Novosibirsk.
  - 10 October – Nikita Khrushchev's second visit.
- 1960
  - Novosibirsk State Theater Institute founded.
  - Journal of Structural Chemistry begins publication.
  - Cold storage facility began to operate.
- 1961 – Nikita Khrushchev visited the city twice.
- 1962
  - Auto Repair Plant and Experimental Mechanical Plant established.
  - Kosmos Cinema opens.
  - Technical School of Foodservice established.
  - Algebra i Logika founded.
  - HC Sibir Novosibirsk founded.
  - Special Design Bureau of Scientific Instrument Engineering established.
- 1963
  - January – Physics and Mathematics School opens.
  - 1 December – Pod Integralom Debating Club opens.
  - VEP-1 particle accelerator begins operating at the Budker Institute of Nuclear Physics.
  - Sibeltrans (Tram and Trolleybus Repair Plant) founded.
- 1964
  - 1 January – Institute of Computational Mathematics and Mathematical Geophysics established.
  - Ice Sports Palace Sibir opens.
  - Rzhanov Institute of Semiconductor Physics established.
  - Plant of Reinforced Concrete Supports and Piles begins operating.
- 1965
  - Population: 1,029,000.
  - Avtometriya scientific magazine begins publication.
- 1966
  - Siberian Mathematical Journal established.
  - Institute of Applied Physics founded.
  - Institute of Archeology and Ethnography formed.
  - 23–25 June – Charles de Gaulle's visit to Novosibirsk.
- 1967
  - Novosibirsk Military Command Academy established.
  - State Scientific Research Institute of Physiology and Basic Medicine established.
- 1968 – Institute of Soil Science and Agrochemistry founded.
- 1969 – Aurora Cinema opens.
- 1970
  - January – EKO economic magazine begins publication.
  - 10 October – Georges Pompidou's visit.
  - Statue of Lenin, Novosibirsk unveiled in Lenin Square, Novosibirsk.
  - Katalizator Special Design and Technological Bureau established.
  - Beginning of the gray rat domestication experiment at the Institute of Cytology and Genetics.
- 1971 – Novosibirsk Chess Club was founded.
- 1972
  - 9 February – Gorizont Cinema opens.
- 1975
  - March – Novosibirsk scientists have synthesized a new polymer, on the basis of which a fireproof artificial fabric will subsequently be created, recommended for the manufacture of suits for cosmonauts (future participants in the flight under the Soyuz-Apollo program).
  - July
    - 17 July – West German Chancellor Willy Brandt's visit.
    - Specialized cafe-confectionery with a wide range of confectionery and bakery products, ice cream, coffee and tea opens on Karl Marx Prospekt.
    - The Institute of Clinical and Experimental Medicine of the Siberian Branch of the USSR Academy of Medical Sciences and the Arctic and Antarctic Research Institute signed an agreement on cooperation in the systematic study of the problems of human adaptation in the polar regions.
  - 25 August – The development of a new cardiology center in the City Clinical Hospital No. 34 begins. The cardio center is designed to record ECG on magnetic and paper tape by telephone at any distance. It was also possible to get advice from specialists from other cities.
  - 20 September – Soloist of the Novosibirsk Opera and Ballet Theater Anatoly Berdyshev arrived with a group of Soviet artists on tour in Italy. At the opening of the season at the Milan Opera, he danced the part of José in the Carmen Suite with Carmen, People's Artist of the USSR Maya Plisetskaya.
  - 26 September – The experimental pool was created at the Novosibirsk Institute of Water Transport Engineers, in which a powerful current is created and the loads on the model are recorded using the control panel.
  - 28 September – Soviet and American cosmonauts arrived in the city: Alexei Leonov, Vladimir Shatalov, Valery Kubasov, Deke Slayton, Vance D. Brand and Thomas P. Stafford.
  - October – New bus route No. 26 opens going from Garin-Mikhailovsky Square to VASKhNIL. Its length is 23 km. It became the 42nd bus route of the city.
  - 12 November – Molochnoye Specialized Cafe opens on Ordzhonikidze Street.
  - 31 December – On New Year's Eve, N.A. Rimsky-Korsakov's Christmas Eve was performed at the Novosibirsk Opera and Ballet Theater.
  - Sovetskaya Sibir Printing House built in Kirovsky District of Novosibirsk.
  - Novosibirsk Television Studio begins color broadcasting. The first color broadcast started with the opening of the hockey season at the Sibir Stadium located in Kalininsky District of the city.
  - The 5th Microdistrict (or Snegiri), the northernmost microdistrict of the city, is being actively built.
  - Novosibirsk Household Chemicals Plant established.
  - Novosibirskmebel production association for the production of furniture founded.
  - By the end of the year, Novosibirsk has 166 industrial enterprises, 171 construction enterprises, 63 transport enterprises, and 19 communications enterprises. In addition, the city has 277 secondary schools, 52 vocational schools, 16 higher education institutions, more than a hundred research and design institutes, 6 theaters, 52 clubs and houses of culture, 120 post offices, 8 parks, 6 swimming pools, 64 libraries, 120 hospitals and clinics, 21 cinemas, as well as a circus, a hippodrome and a zoo.
- 1976
  - January
    - 4 January – Ocean Fish Shop opens in Kirovsky District.
    - The argon laser was created at the Institute of Semiconductor Physics, which differs from other analogues in its high power of continuous visible radiation.
  - 9 April – Visit of the Prime Minister of Sweden Olof Palme accompanied by the Prime Minister of the USSR Alexei Kosygin.
  - 26 July – Kirovsky Department Store opens on Petukhov Street.
  - Novosibirskryba fish plant begins operating.
- 1977 – Novosibirsk Thermal Power Plant 5 started operating.
- 1978
  - Dimitrovsky Bridge built.
  - Institute of Single Crystals founded.
- 1980 – Part of the Dzerzhinsky District became the Kalininsky District.
- 1981
  - 7 February – Production of Pepsi-Kola tonic drink begins in the city under an agreement between the Ministry of Trade USSR and PepsiCo.
  - 21 September – Institute of Therapy of the SB RAMS established.
  - Institute of Clinical Immunology established.
  - Siberian Synchrotron and Terahertz Radiation Centre was established.
  - Insula Magica (early music group) formed.
- 1982 – ND experiment.
- 1983
  - Vocational School No. 60 established (future Novosibirsk College of Hairdressing).
- 1984 – Novosibirsk Globus Theatre built.
- 1985
  - Population: 1,393,000.
  - Novosibirsk Hotel built.
- 1986
  - Novosibirsk Metro begins operating.
  - Metro Bridge opens.
  - Institute of Informatics and Computer Science established.
  - Gas-Dynamic Plasma Trap (GDL) begins operating at the Budker Institute of Nuclear Physics.
  - Zakrytoye Predpriyatiye (new wave band) formed.
- 1987
  - Ploshchad Garina-Mikhaylovskogo Metro Station opens.
  - Sibirskaya Metro Station built.
  - 12 February – Luch Plant produces the first two-cassette tape recorders.
- 1988
  - SoftLab-NSK in business.
  - Aerospace Lyceum named after Yury Kondratyuk founded.
  - Sibirsky Diksilend (jazz orchestra) formed.
- 1989
  - Siberian Serpentarium established.
  - Moment Istiny newspaper begins publication.
  - International Tomographic Center was created.
  - International Tomography Centre SB RAS established.
  - Novosibirsk Architectural Institute founded.
  - SibIA (newspaper of democratic opposition) begins publication.
- 1990
  - 1 August – Doverie newspaper begins publication.
  - 24 October – Accept Bank in business.
  - 4 December – Sibirsky Bank in business.
  - Sibakadembank in business.
  - Institute of Computational Technologies founded.
  - Institute of Informatics Systems established.
  - Institute of Archaeology and Ethnography founded.
  - Tseosit Research and Engineering Center established.
  - Delovaya Sibir newspaper begins publication.
  - Sister city relationship established with Sapporo, Japan.
  - Mangazeya Publishing House established.
- 1991
  - 17 January – Levoberezhny Bank in business.
  - 11 February – Vedomosti Novosibirskogo Oblastnogo Soveta newspaper begins publication.
  - 5 March – Sibirsky Khronograf scientific publishing house begins operating.
  - 7 May – Novosibirskie Novosti newspaper begins publication.
  - 1 August – Mir Television Station, the city's first private television company, began regular broadcasting.
  - Center of Financial Technologies established.
  - Ploshchad Marksa Metro Station built.
  - Siberian Stock Exchange established.
  - Research Institute of Clinical and Experimental Lymphology established.
  - Institute of Laser Physics founded.
  - Vitaly Mukha becomes governor of Novosibirsk Oblast.
  - Siberian Grain Corporation in business.
  - Otvazhnzya Peshka International Children's Festival established for chess competitions.
  - International Centre of Aerophysical Research founded.
  - International Centre for Research and Testing of Catalysts organized.
  - Sibir Hotel opens.
  - Stroikeramika brick plant started operation.
  - Russian Journal of Engineering Thermophysics begins publication.
  - Technological Design Institute of Applied Microelectronics established.
- 1992
  - February – Rost teen newspaper begins publication.
  - 15 September – Siberian Interbank Currency Exchange established.
  - Novosibirsk Union of Auditors in business.
  - Novosibirsk State Technical University active.
  - Biathlon World Championships 1992
  - Gagarinskaya Metro Station opens.
  - Zayeltsovskaya Metro Station built.
  - NTN 4 (TV channel) was founded.
- 1993
  - April – Timur speculative fiction publishing house established.
  - October – NTN 12 (TV channel) begins broadcasting.
  - Novaya Sibir newspaper begins publication.
  - Westfalika Shoe Company was founded by an army officer, Mikhail Titov.
  - Novosibirsk College of Olympic Reserve established.
  - Rozhdestvo Folklore Ensemble founded.
  - Concert Wind Orchestra formed.
- 1994
  - September – Proza Sibiri literary magazine begins publication.
  - 1 October – Mir Radio Station begins broadcasting.
  - November – Radio Slovo established.
  - Novosibirsk Gerontological Center opens.
  - Germany opens its consulate in Novosibirsk.
- 1995
  - January – Novosibirskaya Kamerata Ensemble of Soloists founded.
  - 6 December – Radio NTN begins broadcasting.
  - SND Experiment.
  - BrokerCreditService established.
- 1996
  - Sibir-Hokkaido founded.
  - New York Pizza restaurant chain in business.
  - Ekran FEP, a manufacturer of image intensifiers, established.
- 1997
  - 30 January – Chestnoye Slovo newspaper begins publication.
  - 6 March – The murder of the general director of Novosibirsk Chocolate Factory Vera Kopasova.
  - 1 April – Na Levom Beregu Drama Theater founded.
  - 7 May – Radio Melodi begins broadcasting.
  - Transfiguration Cathedral built.
  - Hillary Clinton's visit to Novosibirsk.
  - Traveler's Coffee founded.
  - Circulation Pathology and Cardiac Surgery magazine begins publication.
  - NPM Group in business.
  - Renewal pharmaceutical company in business.
  - Vavilov Journal of Genetics and Breeding begins publication.
- 1998
  - 5 March – Novosibirsk branch of the Interpol National Central Bureau of the Ministry of Internal Affairs of Russia organized.
  - Sibers established.
  - Siberian Technological Machine Building Plant (Sibtekhnomash) founded.
  - Journal of Applied and Industrial Mathematics begins publication.
- 1999
  - On the night of 8 to 9 March, unknown persons destroyed the synagogue in Novosibirsk. The attackers broke furniture, destroyed the library and various valuable items, including the Torah Scroll (according to other source, the Torah was stolen). The walls of the building were covered with swear words and threats against the Jews. Among these inscriptions was found the abbreviation of RNU.
  - The chairman of the board of directors of the Novosibirskgeologiya Yuri Fyodorov was killed.
  - Alawar established.
  - 2GIS founded.
  - Sibirsky Bereg snack food company in business.
  - Viktor Tolokonsky becomes governor of Novosibirsk Oblast.
- 2000
  - 7 June – OTS Radio begins broadcasting.
  - 25 July – Church of the Theotokos of the Sign was consecrated.
  - 17 November – Vladimir Putin's first visit to the city.
  - 28 December – Marshala Pokryshkina Metro Station opens.
  - Sibir International Fotosalon biennale was held for the first time.
  - CDEK delivery company in business.
  - Sib-Altera theatre festival begins.
  - Vladimir Gorodetsky becomes mayor.
  - City becomes part of the Siberian Federal District.
  - Museum for Railway Technology Novosibirsk established.
  - Novosibirsk Center of Belarusian Culture was founded.
  - Archeology, Ethnography and Anthropology of Eurasia scientific journal begins publication.
  - Sibirsky Brass Ensemble established.

== 21st century ==
- 2001
  - March – The Novosibirsk Chamber of Commerce and Industry established.
  - 10 July – Avtoradio Novosibirsk begins broadcasting.
  - The murder of the vice mayor of Novosibirsk Igor Belyakov.
- 2002
  - 7 September – Aivazovsky's painting "Going aground" was stolen from the Novosibirsk State Art Museum.
  - Novosibirsk became the third largest city in terms of population after Moscow and Saint Petersburg.
  - Roman Catholic Diocese of Transfiguration at Novosibirsk active.
  - 14-hectare car market opens in Zatulinsky Zhilmassiv, Kirovsky District.
  - Rich Family in business.
  - Euroasian Entomological Journal begins publication.
- 2003
  - 14 October – Istoricheskoye Nasledie Sibiri Publishing House established.
  - Novosibirsk Crematorium was opened.
  - OR Group shoe company in business.
  - Punk TV (musical group) formed.
- 2004
  - February – Institute of Computational Mathematics and Mathematical Geophysics creates the Expert Database on Tsunami Observation in the Pacific Ocean.
  - October – The director of the Sibir Hotel and Siberian Scientific Research Institute of Metrology Alexei Kondrashov was killed.
  - The murder of the vice mayor of Novosibirsk Valery Mariasov.
  - SCIENCE First Hand magazine begins publication.
  - For the first time the Total Dictation was held.
  - Elenarda Tolkien Club founded.
- 2005
  - Beryozovaya Roshcha Metro Station built.
  - Small West Siberian Railway opens.
  - EF English First opens in the city.
  - Biathlon European Championships 2005.
- 2006
  - 11 April – The murder of the head of the Sale of Confiscated and Seized Property of the Russian Federal Property Fund Sergey Korolko. He was stabbed in the chest and back several times in Zheleznodorozhny District of the city.
- 2007
  - September – The city launched a tracking system for public transport using the GLONASS satellite system.
  - Nicolas Roerich Museum founded.
  - ΣΧΟΛΗ magazine of ancient philosophy and classical tradition begins publication.
- 2008
  - 15 December – Pervy Theatre founded.
  - 26 May – Baltika-Novosibirsk Brewery was commissioned.
  - 25 Juny – Pliny Starshy bookstore opens.
  - September – Kapital bookstore opens.
  - Novosibirsk was in the center of the path of a solar eclipse.
  - The plant of the Orion Confectionery started operating in Novosibirsk.
- 2009
  - Goethe-Institut opens in Novosibirsk.
  - i'way transfer company in business.
- 2010
  - 17 April – Versal Shopping and Office Center opens on Karl Marx Square.
  - Zolotaya Niva Metro Station opens.
  - Population: 1,473,754.
- 2011
  - 18 March – Aura Mall was opened.
  - May – Sun City Multifunctional Complex opens.
  - Rusaviaprom Aircraft Plant established.
- 2012
  - 31 January – Novosibirsk Expocentre opens.
  - 8 February – opening of the second planetarium of the city.
  - 22–23 June – opening of the monument to Tsar Alexander III.
  - ШКЯ art project for the creation of comics established.
- 2013
  - August – Yandex opened an office in Zheleznodorozhny District.
  - November – Yandex opened a second office in Sovetsky District.
  - Languages and Folklore of Indigenous Peoples of Siberia magazine begins publication.
  - Arnold Katz State Concert Hall was built.
  - The first Burger King restaurant was opened in the city.
  - Ploho (musical group) formed.
  - Novosibirsk Сourt sentenced Konstantin Rudnev, the founder of the Ashram Shambala sect, to 11 years in a colony of strict regimen.
- 2014
  - 1 March – Kaleidoskop na Marxa Trade and Exhibition Centre opens.
  - 26 July – The first McDonald's restaurant was opened in the Aura Mall.
  - 16 December – Galereya Novosibirsk Mall opens at the intersection of Gogol and Michurin streets.
  - Bugrinsky Bridge opens.
  - Anatoly Lokot becomes mayor.
  - Buerak (musical group) formed.
  - Maskulo Fetish Clothing Company for Men in business.
- 2015
  - 7 June – Alexei Navalny's visit to Novosibirsk.
  - September – Novosibirsk Metal Cutting Plant established.
  - December – Colliding Electron-Positron Beams-5 (VEPP-5) begins operating at the Budker Institute of Nuclear Physics.
  - Pingvin Curling Club opens.
- 2016
  - Novosibirsk Dolphinarium opens.
  - Akvamir Waterpark built.
  - Chistaya Sloboda Microdistrict and Marx Square were connected by a tram line.
- 2017
  - 19 March – Alexei Navalny's visit to the city.
- 2018
  - The reconstruction of the Mikhailovskaya Embankment was completed.
  - School No. 214 named after Elizaveta Glinka opens.
  - 7 February – Vladimir Putin's visit to Novosibirsk.
- 2019
  - September — School No. 216 opens in Plyushchikhinsky Zhilmassiv, Oktyabrsky District.
- 2020
  - 30 January – Church of Our Lady of Kazan built in KSM Microdistrict.
  - 10 February – School No. 217 was opened in Yuzhno-Chemskoy Microdistrict.
  - 16–23 March – Russian Wheelchair Curling Championship.
  - 15 August – Alexei Navalny's visit to Novosibirsk.
  - 1 September (or a little later) – School No. 218 opens in Rodniki Microdistrict.
  - 5 September – Museum of Retro Technology opens.
  - According to Forbes, in 2020, Novosibirsk has become one of the most popular destinations for business tourism in Russia.
- 2021
  - 23 January – Alexei Navalny protests, more than 90 people detained by the Novosibirsk police.
  - 31 January – Alexei Navalny protests, Novosibirsk police detained over 100 people.
  - 17–24 April – Russian Fencing Championship.
  - 28 June – The 4th Leroy Merlin store opens in Novosibirsk.
  - 6 December – Food hall opened at the Tsentralny Market (in the media, this location is called a gastrocourt).
  - 17 December – Mir Television Station ceased broadcasting.
- 2022
  - Late February – Protests against the Russian invasion of Ukraine on Kalinin and Pimenov squares.
  - 1 March – Roskomnadzor blocked the Taiga.info local online-edition.
  - July – Russia's first School of Olympic Reserve in esports opens in Novosibirsk.
  - 1 September – School No. 219 opens in Rodniki Microdistrict.
  - 21 September – Protest against mobilization.
  - 29 September – An unknown person threw two bottles of flammable liquid into the windows of the military commissariat on the left bank of the city. A small fire broke out outside the building.
- 2023
  - 9 February
    - A gas explosion in a residential building on Lineinaya Street, as a result the building has been partially destroyed and 14 people died.
    - New terminal at Tolmachyovo Airport opens.
  - 31 May – Yevgeny Prigozhin's visit to the city.
  - 10 June – Grani Shopping Centre built.
  - August
    - 13 August – Sibir Arena Ice Palace opens.
    - 27 August – 2 September – Russian Mixed Curling Cup.
    - Kirovsky Rynok Shopping Centre opens.
- 2025
  - 5 September – Sportivnaya Metro Station opens.
  - 15 December – Tsentralny Bridge opens.

== See also ==
- Novosibirsk history
- Novosibirsk history (in Russian)
- Timeline of Berdsk
- Timelines of other cities in the Siberian Federal District of Russia: Omsk

== Bibliography ==
- William Henry Beable (1919), "Novo-Nicolaievsk", Russian Gazetteer and Guide, London: Russian Outlook
