= Timeline of Berdsk =

The following is a timeline of the history of the city of Berdsk, Russia.

== 18th–19th centuries ==
- 1716 – Berd Ostrog was built at the confluence of the Berd River into the Ob River.
- 1777 – The road (trakt) passed from Barnaul to Berd Ostrog, as a result this place became an important hub for horse-drawn and water transport.
- 1783 – Catherine the Great ordered to assign the status of a provincial city (Kolyvan) to the Berd Ostrog, which became the center of the Kolyvan Governorate.
- 12 December 1796 – By decree of Paul I, Kolyvan Governorate was abolished, its territory was included in the Tobolsk and Irkutsk governorates; 2 November 1797, the city of Kolyvan became a settlement of Berdskoye.
- 1869 — Berdsk Uprising.
- 1870 – Merchant Vladimir Gorokhov (1849–1907) bought the mill from the widow of the merchant Vasiliev, it was located 4 verst east of Berdsk.
- 1899 – Health camp for physically weakened children opens under the patronage of the merchant Vladimir Gorokhov.

== 20th century ==
- 1908 – Vladimir Gorokhov's son Sergey organized the cableway along which 54 trolleys move; grinding products were transported towards the Berdsk pier, and the grain moved from the pier to the mill.
- 1915 – The movement of trains along the Altai Railway begins which passed 10 versts east of the settlement; now one of its stations is part of the Berdsk.
- 1944
  - 9 February – The working settlement of Berdsk was transformed into a town of regional submission.
- 1946 – Berdsk Radio Plant established.
- 1954
  - February – the first information in the newspapers about the upcoming relocation of the city to a new location in connection with the construction of the Novosibirsk Hydroelectric Station.
  - 26 March – An article appeared in one of the newspapers informing residents that the city would fall into the flood zone due to the construction of a hydroelectric power station and the formation of Novosibirsk Reservoir and that 10 000 buildings, including 2500 households, 4 schools, house of culture, kindergartens, nurseries, enterprises and government institutions will be moved to a new location.
- 1957
  - Home for the disabled, bread and garment factories were built within the new city, the construction of a hospital complex (4-storey main building for 100 beds, infectious disease building, economic building) and communication office begins.
- 1959 – Berdsk Electromechanical Plant established.
- 1964
  - February – Berdsk Chemical Plant produced the first product (antibiotic Biovit-40 for the treatment of farm animals).
- 2000
  - Autumn – S-TEP Shoe Factory established.

== 21st century ==
- 2001
  - Transfiguration Cathedral built.
- 2016
  - 7 October – McDonald's restaurant opens in the city.
- 2022
  - Population – 102 850 people.

== See also ==
- Timeline of Novosibirsk
