= Novosibirsk Infectious Diseases Hospital No. 1 =

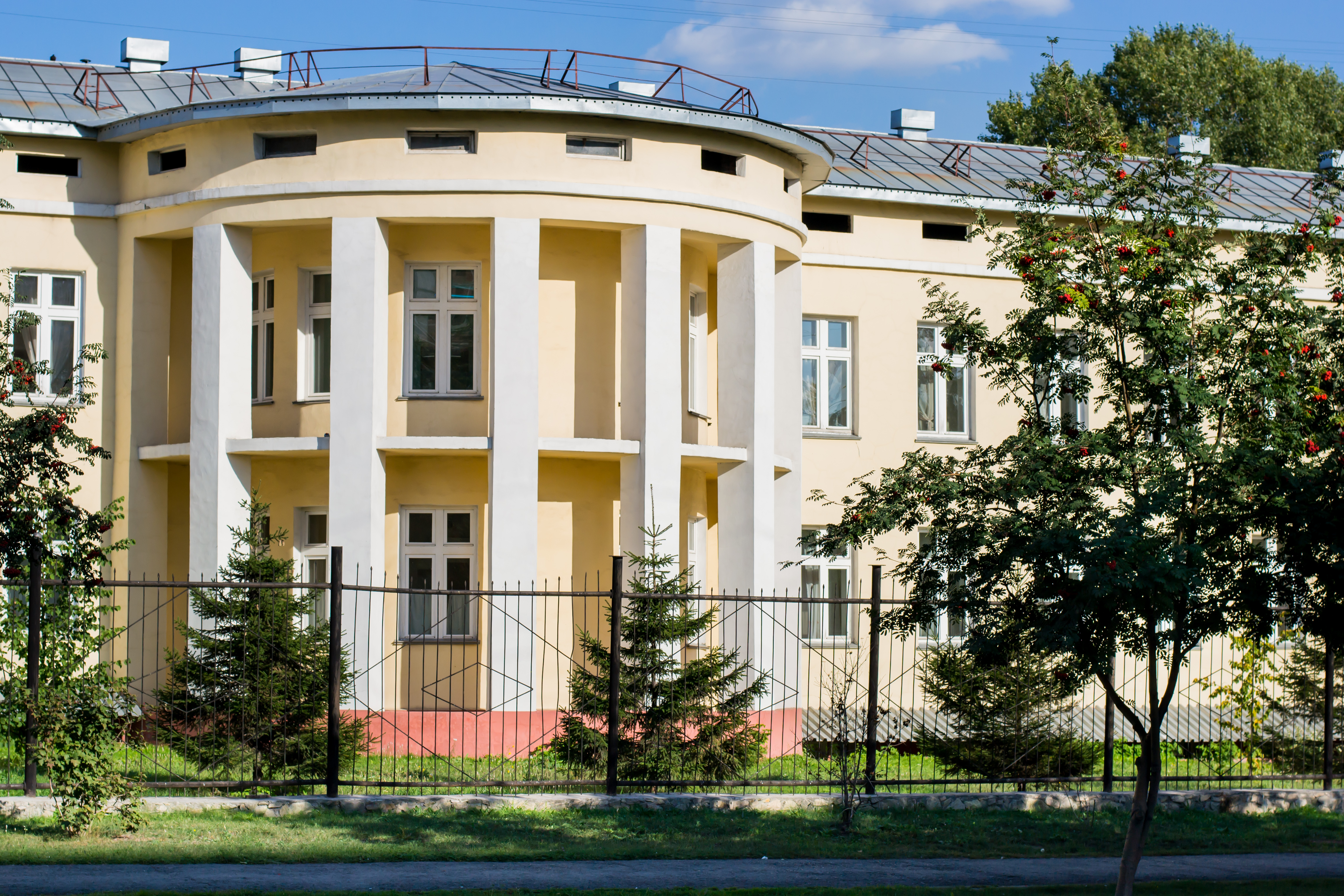

Geography
- Location: Novosibirsk, Russia

History
- Opened: 1904

Novosibirsk Infectious Diseases Hospital No. 1 (Russian: Городская инфекционная клиническая больница № 1) is a hospital in Tsentralny District of Novosibirsk, Russia. It was founded in 1904.

== History ==
In the late 19th century, large inflows of migrants to Novonikolayevsky Settlement (now Novosibirsk) gave rise to cases of infectious diseases, such as typhus, dysentery, cholera.

In 1904 (or 1906), the Infectious Diseases Hospital was established. It opened in rented premises on Yadrintsevskaya Street.

In 1912, a new hospital was constructed at 40 place (now block No. 1).

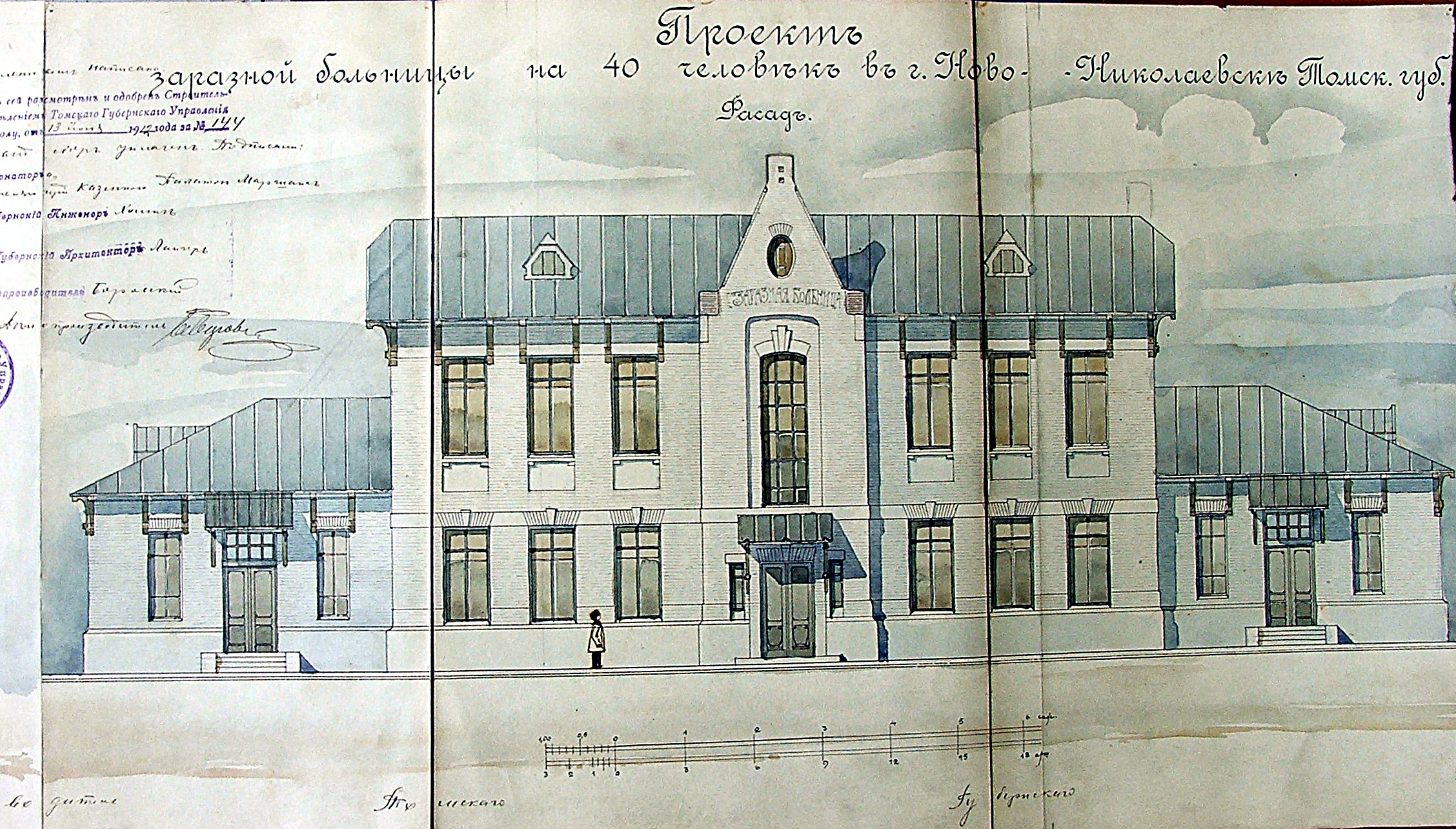
Project of the hospital built in 1912

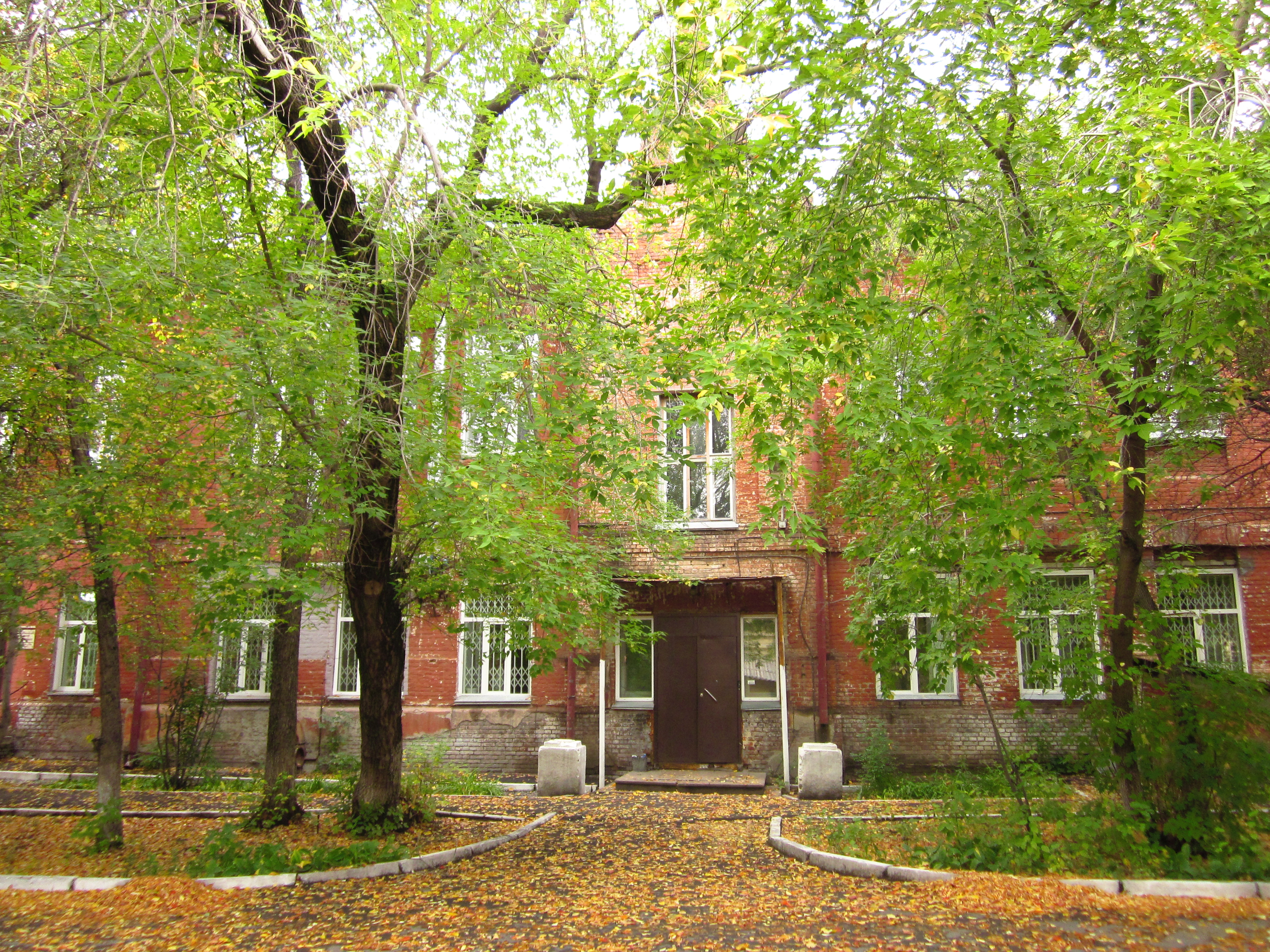

=== COVID-19 ===
Since 2020, the hospital began to accept COVID-19 patients.

== See also ==
- Novosibirsk City Clinical Hospital No. 1
