= Katalizator =

Russian materials company

- Founded: 1970
- Headquarters: Novosibirsk, Russia
- Products: catalysts, sorbents, catalyst carriers etc.
- Website: katcom.ru

SKTB Katalizator (Russian: СКТБ Катализатор) is a special design and technological bureau in Sovetsky District of Novosibirsk, Russia. It was founded in 1970. The company manufactures catalysts, sorbents, catalyst carriers etc.

== History ==
The organization was created in 1970, at the initiative of Georgy Boreskov, director of the Institute of Catalysis of the Siberian Branch of the USSR Academy of Sciences.

Initially, the bureau began its activities on the premises of the Institute of Catalysis. At the same time, a building complex for the organization was under construction (1971–1980). The first buildings of the organization were commissioned in 1973.

== Activities ==
The company develops and manufactures catalysts, catalyst carriers, sorbents and desiccants for oil processing, thermostable catalysts for the dehydrogenation of hydrocarbons in a fluidized bed for the production of synthetic rubber, palladium and vanadium catalysts; dessicants for organic liquids and industrial gases etc.

== Locations ==
The company's plants are located in Shlyuz and ObGES microdistricts of Sovetsky District of Novosibirsk, as well as in Krasnoyarsk Krai and Ryazan Oblast.

== Bibliography ==
- Ламин В. А. (2003). Энциклопедия. Новосибирск. Новосибирск: Новосибирское книжное издательство. p. 403. ISBN 5-7620-0968-8.
