= Novonikolayevsk City Police Department =

Police department, Russian Empire

Novonikolayevsk City Police Department (NGPU) was a law enforcement organization in Novonikolayevsk, Russian Empire, that existed from 1903 to 1917.

== History ==
The police department was established in 1903 after Novonikolayevsk was granted city status. The organization controlled three parts (uchastki) of the city: Tsentralny, Vokzalny and Zakamensky, each of which had two subdivisions (okolotki).

At first, the police department rented premises, as it did not have its own building. The office of the court bailiff Arseny Yershov was located in the Teterin House on Barnaulskaya Street and the city bailiff occupied the Nazarov House on Tobizenovskaya Street. Later, the police department got its own building on Barnaulskaya Street. The state-owned apartment of the chief of police (politsmeister) was located in the same place.

In 1907, by order of the Governor of Tomsk Governorate, the extradepartmental night guard with free hired workers was organized.

According to the norms of that time, there should have been one low-ranked policeman (gorodovoy) for 400–500 people, however, as in many cities of the Russian Empire, these rules were not respected. In 1910–1911, the staff of the NGPU consisted of only 33 mounted and 15 unmounted low ranked police officers while the number of Novonikolayevsk residents was about 60 000.

The police of Novonikolayevsk, as well as throughout the Russian Empire, was also involved in activities that were not related to criminality. For example, in 1911, it monitored the planting of trees by city residents near their households; in 1915–1917, the commission for the requisition of butter and meat for the army led by police chief G. P. Bukhartovsky operated in the city.

In 1916–1917, the detective department (Ugolovny rozysk) was created..

After the 1917 February Revolution, the NGPU was liquidated, and police functions were transferred to the city militsiya which was controlled by the Novonikolayevsk Duma..

== Sources of funding and employee wages ==
Funding for the Novonikolayevsk Police came from the city public self-government budget. In the cost estimate of the Novonikolayevsk Duma for 1917, an amount of 270 580 rubles was indicated for the maintenance of the police department while the total amount of planned expenses was 2 654 992 rubles..

The salaries of police officers were small: mounted and pedestrian policemen earned 35 and 25 per month, respectively. A bailiff received 600 rubles a year and a politsmeister earned 900 rubles a year. However, police officers and their families could receive additional payments. For example, in 1910, the city duma paid extra 900 rubles to the politsmeister for the leadership of the night guard and also allocated 100 rubles for the funeral of the murdered policeman in 1911.

== Abuse of power ==
A small material support and a number of other reasons led to official abuses in the police. Among law enforcement officers there were rudeness, bribery, connivance, etc..

In 1909, the activists of the Novonikolayevsk branch of the Union of the Russian People collected 113 applications from persons who had suffered from the local police. The members of the branch asked the Tomsk Governor Nikolay Gondatti to launch an investigation into police abuses. In 1910, the commission was organized, its activities was widely covered in the media. The investigation discovered numerous violations of law. For example, the owners of beer outlets and small shops paid police officials a fixed amount of money from 5 to 20 rubles a month, Jews paid policemen 20–200 rubles a month for the right to live in Novonikolayevsk.

In addition, brothels were also a source of illegal income for the police. Of the 113 brothels of Novonikolayevsk only seven were legal. The largest brothels paid police officers 300 rubles a month. And the women of these establishments could not visit any tavern rooms, except for the Chandorin Inn. Smaller brothels paid 5–10 rubles a month.

In 1914, the trial took place over former employees of the NGPU. Police chief Bernchardt Wisman as well as police officers F. V. Kurnitsky, A. V. Chukreyev, M. N. Dubogrey and V. V. Patsanovsky were sentenced to eight months in prison companies.
