= Research Institute of Clinical and Experimental Lymphology =

Research institute in Novosibirsk, Russia

Research Institute of Clinical and Experimental Lymрhology
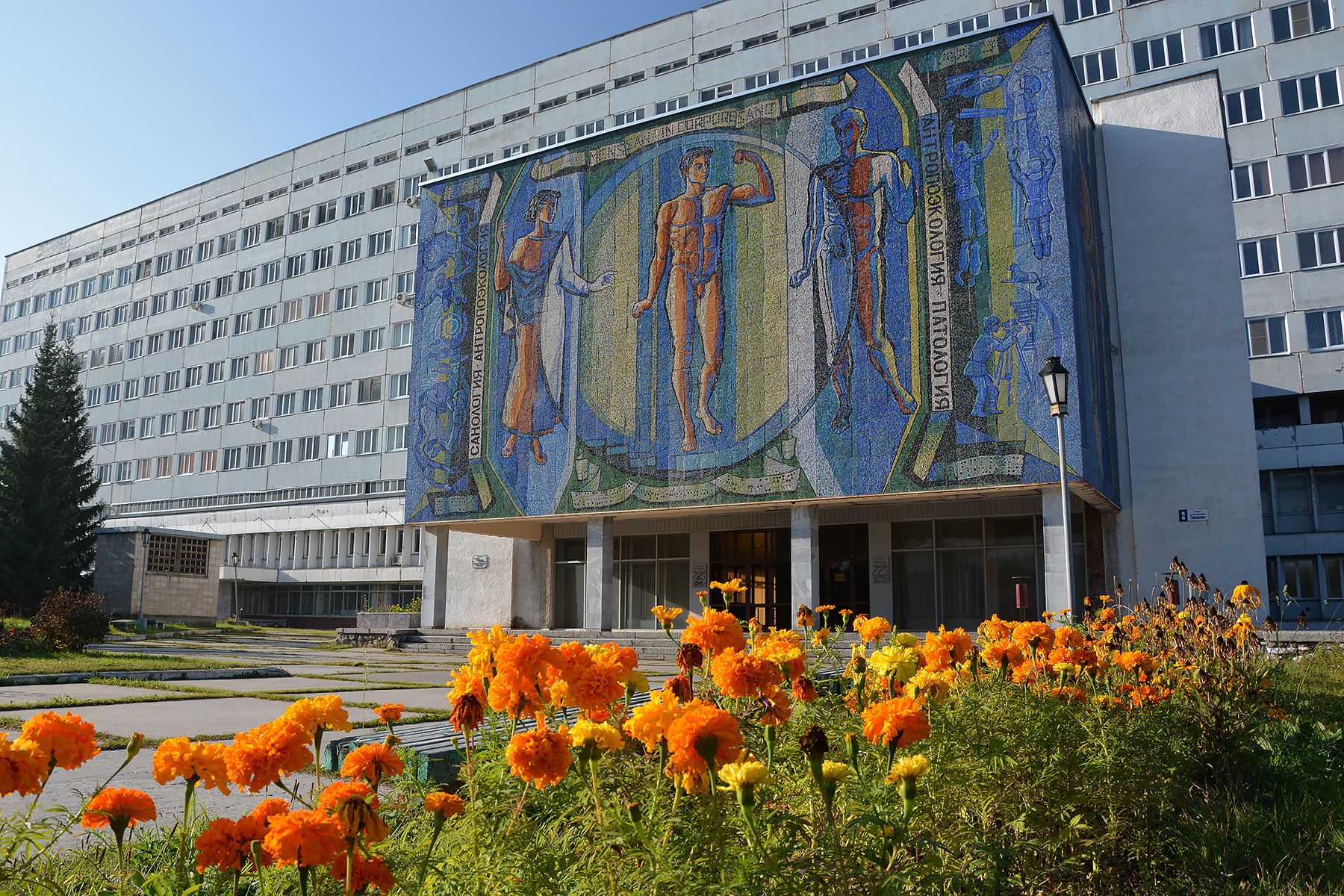
- Established: 1991
- Owner: Siberian Branch of RAS
- Address: Timakov Street 2, Novosibirsk, 630117, Russia
- Location: Novosibirsk, [ussia
- Website: niikel.ru

Research Institute of Clinical and Experimental Lymphology (Russian: Научно-исследовательский институт клинической и экспериментальной лимфологии) is a scientific and medical organization in Sovetsky District of Novosibirsk, Russia. It was founded in 1991. The institute is located in Nizhnyaya Yeltsovka Microdistrict. It is a branch of the Institute of Cytology and Genetics.

== History ==
The collective of Novosirsk lyphologists originated at the Department of Anatomy of the Novosibirsk Medical Institute. In 1948, this department was headed by Professor Konstantin Romodanovsky, who participated in the development of a new scientific direction for that time, called the functional morphology of the lymphatic system.

In 1981, the Institute of Physiology of the Siberian Branch of the Academy of Medical Sciences of the USSR organized the Laboratory of Functional Morphology of the Lymphatic System headed by Yuri Borodin, a disciple of Professor Romodanovsky. In 1989, the facility was transformed into the Department of Lymphology, then it was reorganized into an independent laboratory which was named the Laboratory of Clinical and Experimental Lymphology (1990). In 1991, it became an institute.

In 2017, the institute became a branch of the Institute of Cytology and Genetics.

== Activity ==
Development of treatment methods for primary and secondary lesions of the lymphatic system and methods of lymph detoxification, the study of the effect of medications on the lymphatic system, analysis of the prevalence of diseases of the lymphatic system, rehabilitation of patients suffering from pathologies of the lymphatic system, the training of medical practitioners etc.
