= Sibelektroterm =

Manufacturing company in Russia

- Founded: 1945
- Headquarters: Novosibirsk, Russia
- Products: electric furnaces, gas distribution and mining equipment, agricultural equipment etc.

Sibelektroterm (Russian: Сибэлектротерм) is a manufacturing company in Kirovsky District of Novosibirsk, Russia. It was founded in 1945. The enterprise is a developer and manufacturer of electrometallurgical equipment.

== Production ==
The plant produces electric furnaces, gas distribution and mining equipment, agricultural equipment etc.

== Partnerships ==
The company collaborates with the Budker Institute of Nuclear Physics. In 2020, Sibelektroterm completed several complicated orders for the research work of this scientific organization. In addition, in November 2020, the company won a tender for the supply of magnetic cores for the Siberian Ring Photon Source (SKIF), which has been under construction in Koltsovo since August 2021.

According to an article published in Kontinent Sibir Online in 2021, 80% of the customers of Sibelektroterm's products were Kazakhstan plants.
