= Institute of Soil Science and Agrochemistry =

Russian research institute

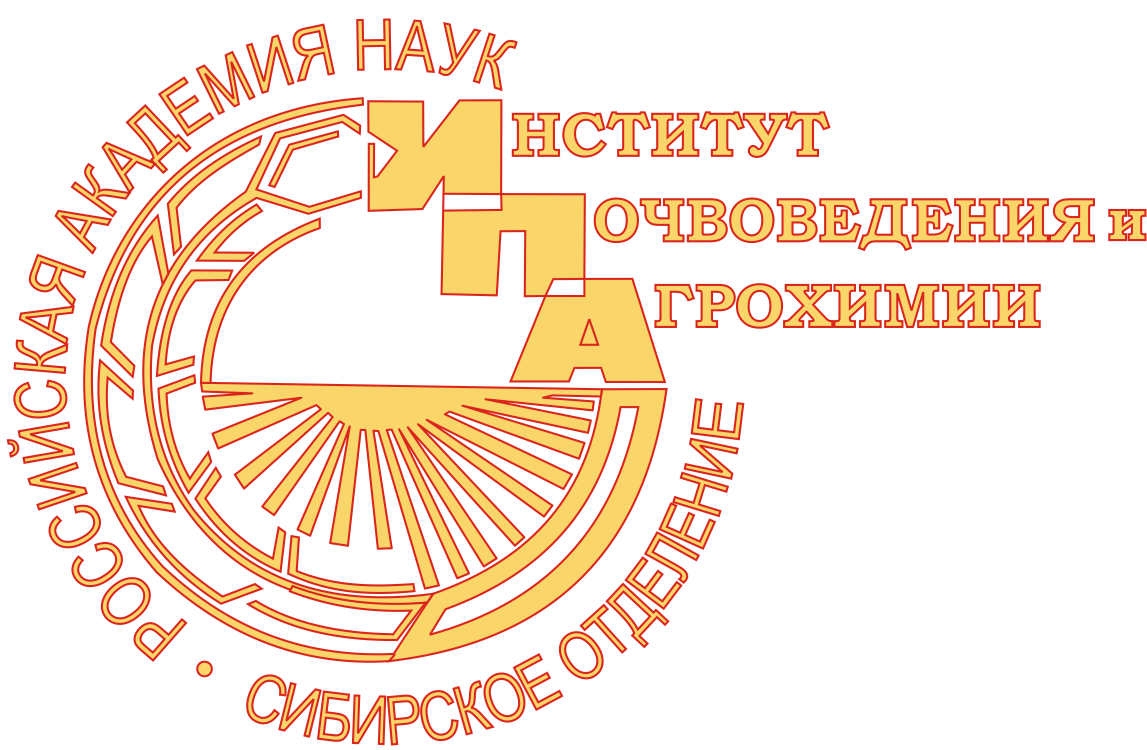
- Established: 1968
- Director: Alexander Syso
- Owner: Siberian Branch of RAS
- Address: Lavrentyev Prospekt, 8/2, Novosibirsk, 630090, Russia
- Location: Novosibirsk, Russia
- Website: issa-siberia.ru

Institute of Soil Science and Agrochemistry (Russian: Институт почвоведения и агрохимии СО РАН) is a research institute in Akademgorodok of Novosibirsk, Russia. It was founded in 1968.

== History ==
The institute was organized in 1968. It was created to study the soils of Siberia and the Russian Far East.

== Scientific activity ==
The creation of new methods of soil and plant diagnostics, development of soil reclamation technologies etc.

== Laboratories ==
- Laboratory of Agrochemistry
- Laboratory of Soil Biogeochemistry
- Laboratory of Biogeocenology
- Laboratory of Geography and Genesis of Soils
- Laboratory of Soil Physical Processes
- Laboratory of Soil Reclamation
