= Novosibirsk Research Institute of Hygiene =

Research institute in Leninsky District of Novosibirsk, Russia

- Established: 1930
- Director: Irina Novikova
- Address: Parkhomenko Street 7, Novosibirsk, 630108, Russia
- Location: Novosibirsk, Russia
- Website: www.niig.su

Novosibirsk Research Institute of Hygiene (Russian: Новосибирский научно-исследовательский институт гигиены) is a research institute in Leninsky District of Novosibirsk, Russia. It was founded in 1930.

== History ==
The organization was established in 1930 by the decision of the West Siberian Krayispolkom as the West Siberian Krai Institute for the Study of Occupational Diseases and worked for the population of West Siberian Krai (modern Novosibirsk, Kemerovo, Tomsk, Omsk oblasts and Altai Krai).

The institute was often renamed in the past: Institute of Social Healthcare and Hygiene (1932), Institute of Sanitation and Hygiene for Coal, Ferrous and Non-ferrous Metals (1935), Novosibirsk Oblast Research Sanitary Institute (1941), Republican Research Sanitation Institute (1948).

== Activities ==
Since 1934, the institute had been engaged in research on pollution and self-purification of the Ob River and its tributaries. In 1936, the organization began to study the level and nature of air pollution in a number of cities: Novosibirsk, Novokuznetsk, Krasnoyarsk, Iskitim, Kemerovo etc. It also carried out a hygienic examination of large construction projects.

During the Great Patriotic War, the institution worked in the field of epidemiology, bacteriology and food hygiene. The food hygiene sector investigated the quality of products and production conditions of the food industry in Western Siberia and was engaged in the search for additional sources of vitamins and proteins. It studied vitamin resources in Western Siberia, the vitamin value of fruits and crops (it was especially interested in sources of vitamin C).

After the war, the institute was engaged in research and improvement of hygienic working conditions and health of workers of large enterprises in Novosibirsk and Novosibirsk Oblast. The institute has studied toxicity and carried out hygiene regulations for more than 100 chemicals.

In 1948, it investigated the likelihood of malaria epidemics within the future Novosibirsk Hydroelectric Station and prepared recommendations for the prevention of malaria during the construction and operation of the station. The institute developed recommendations for conducting sanitary measures during flooding and resettlement of people in the area of the Novosibirsk Reservoir. In 1952–1953, the organization gave a sanitary and hygienic characteristic of the Novosobirsk Reservoir. The institute investigated the composition of groundwater in the West Siberian Plain. In 1950s, the institute began work to create recommendations for improving the hygienic conditions for vocational training of adolescents and young people and for reducing their morbidity; it was also engaged in systematic studies of physical development and functional abnormalities and chronic diseases among children of school and preschool age.
