= Church of the Protection of the Theotokos, Novosibirsk =

Russian Orthodox church in Novosibirsk, Russia

Church of the Protection of the Theotokos Церковь Покрова Пресвятой Богородицы
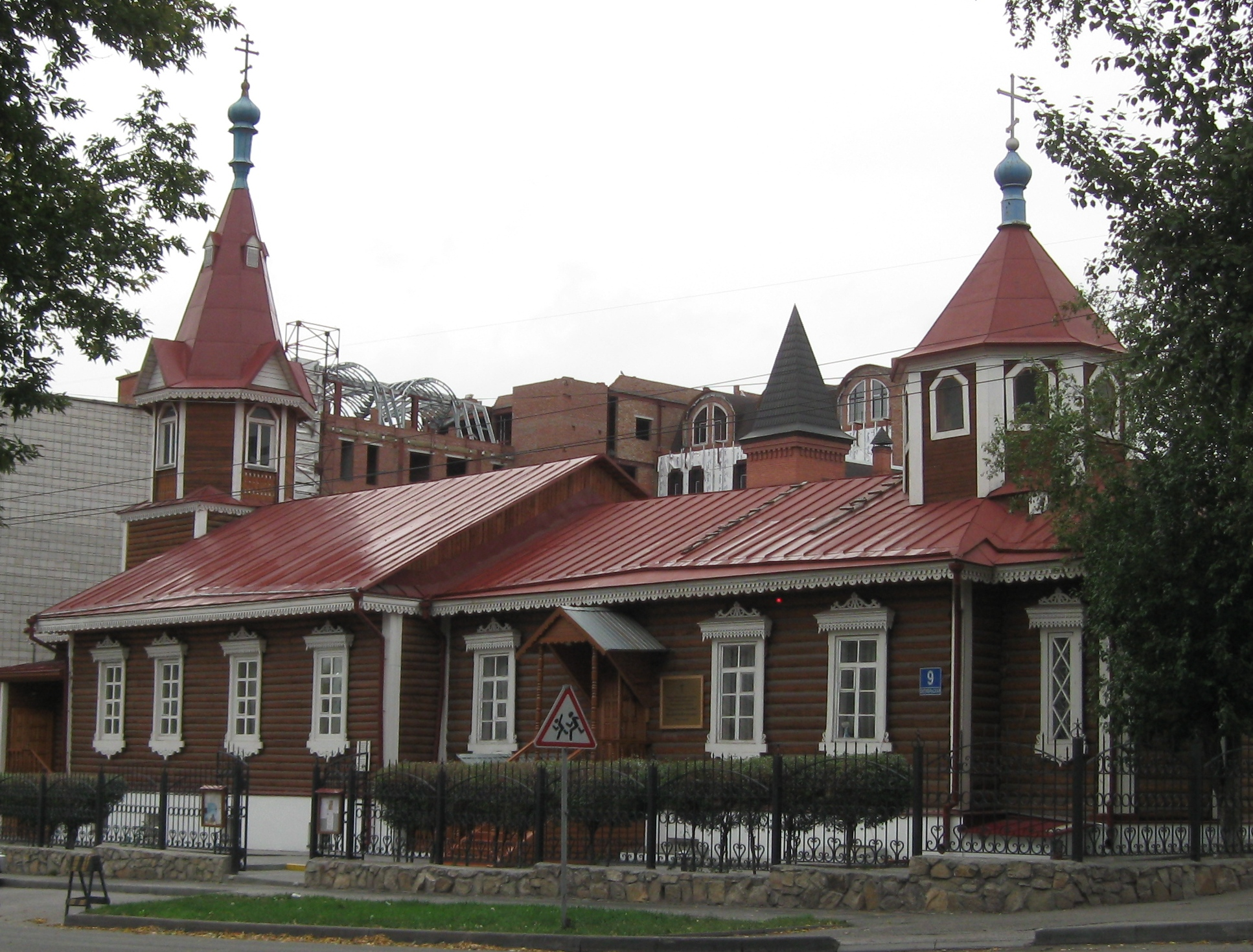

Religion
- Affiliation: Russian Orthodox

Location
- Location: Novosibirsk
- Interactive map of Church of the Protection of the Theotokos; Церковь Покрова Пресвятой Богородицы
- Coordinates: 55°01′27″N 82°54′48″E

Architecture
- Completed: 1901

Church of the Protection of the Theotokos (Russian: Церковь Покрова Пресвятой Богородицы) is a Russian Orthodox church in Zheleznodorozhny City District of Novosibirsk, Russia. It was built in 1901.

== History ==
Church of the Protection of the Theotokos was consecrated on December 10, 1901 by Protoiereus Fyodor Sosunov.

The church was expanded in 1906, the refectory and the bell tower were attached to it.

In 1915, the parish had more than 2000 parishioners.

In the early 1930s, the church was closed and then occupied by various organizations (theater school, Siberian Folk Choir etc.).

In 1994, it was transferred to the Novosibirsk Diocese.

From 2002 to 2007, it was reconstructed.

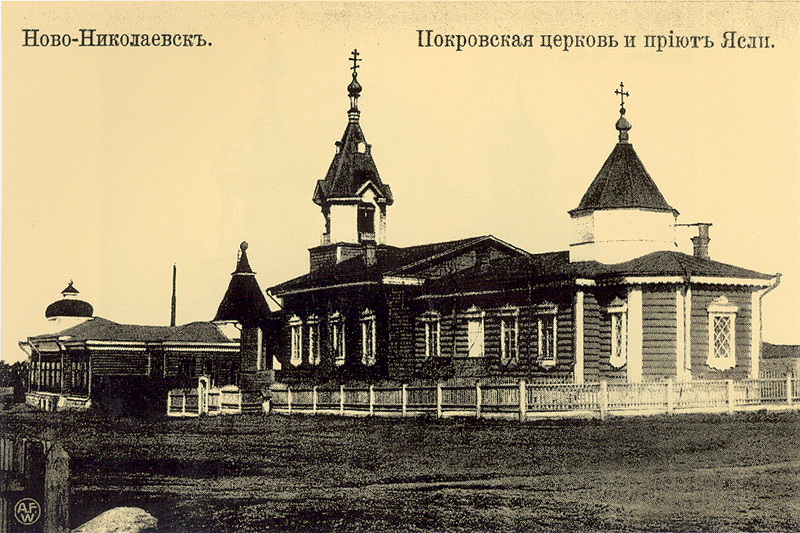
Tsarist period

== Gallery ==
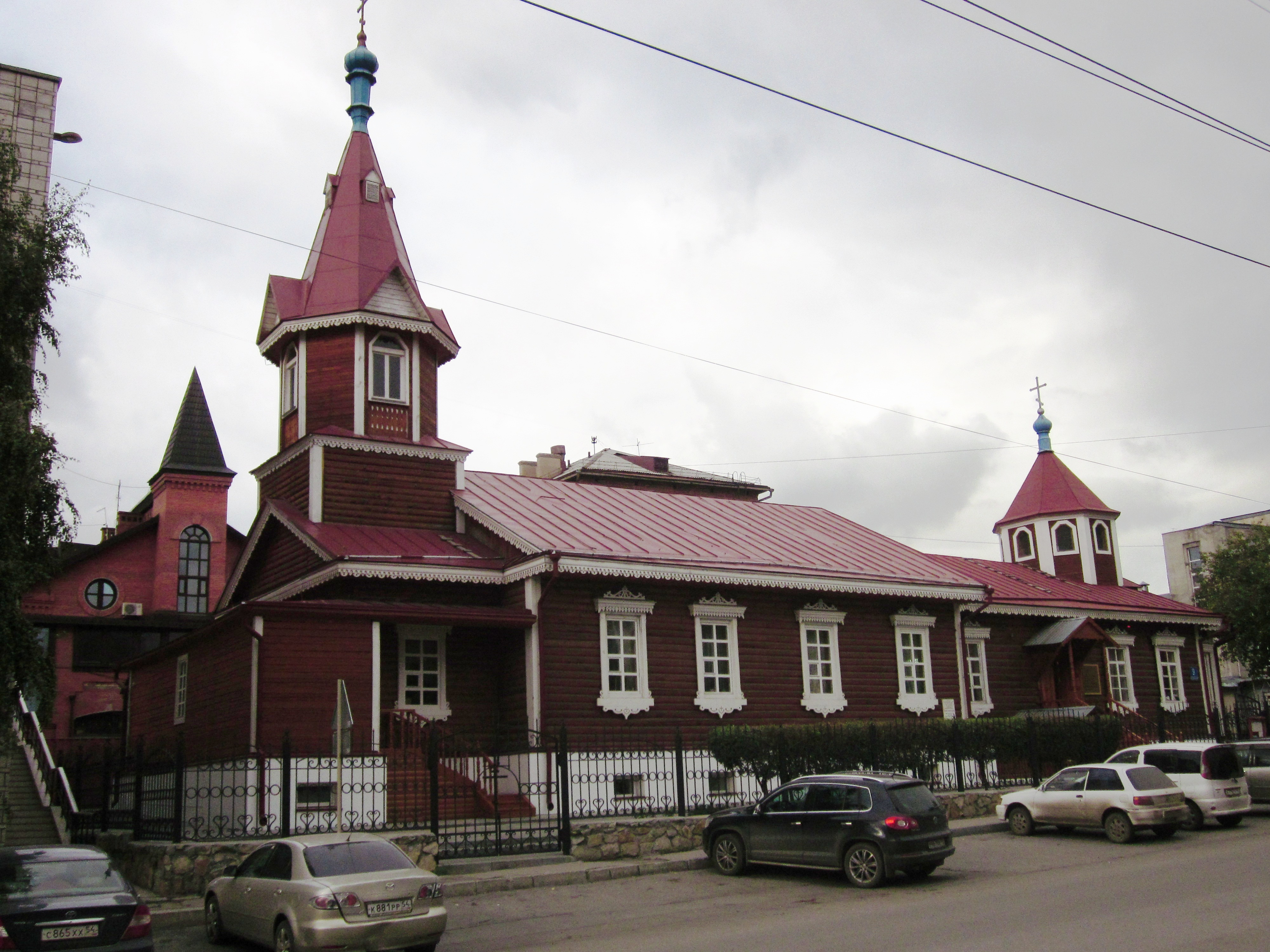

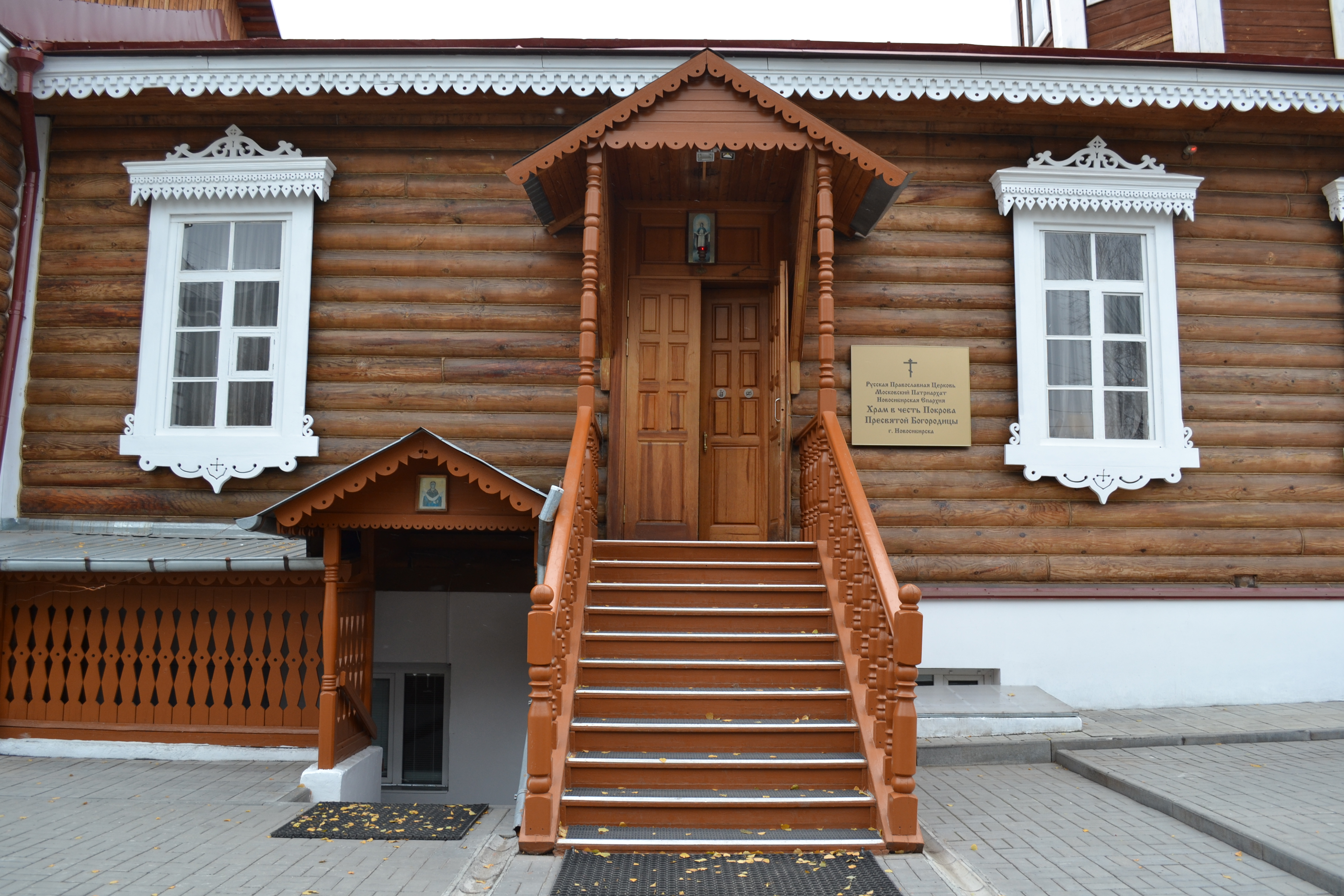

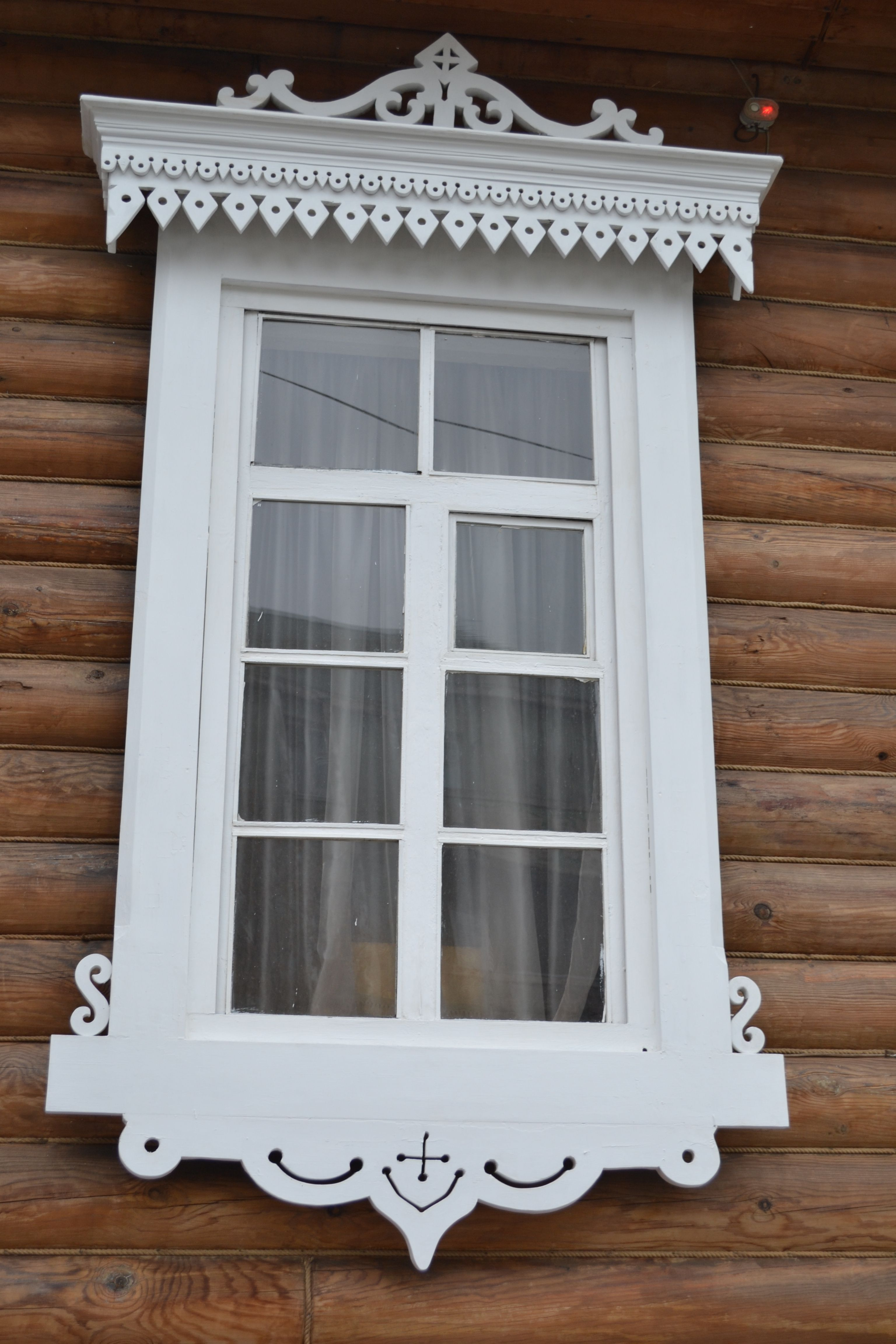

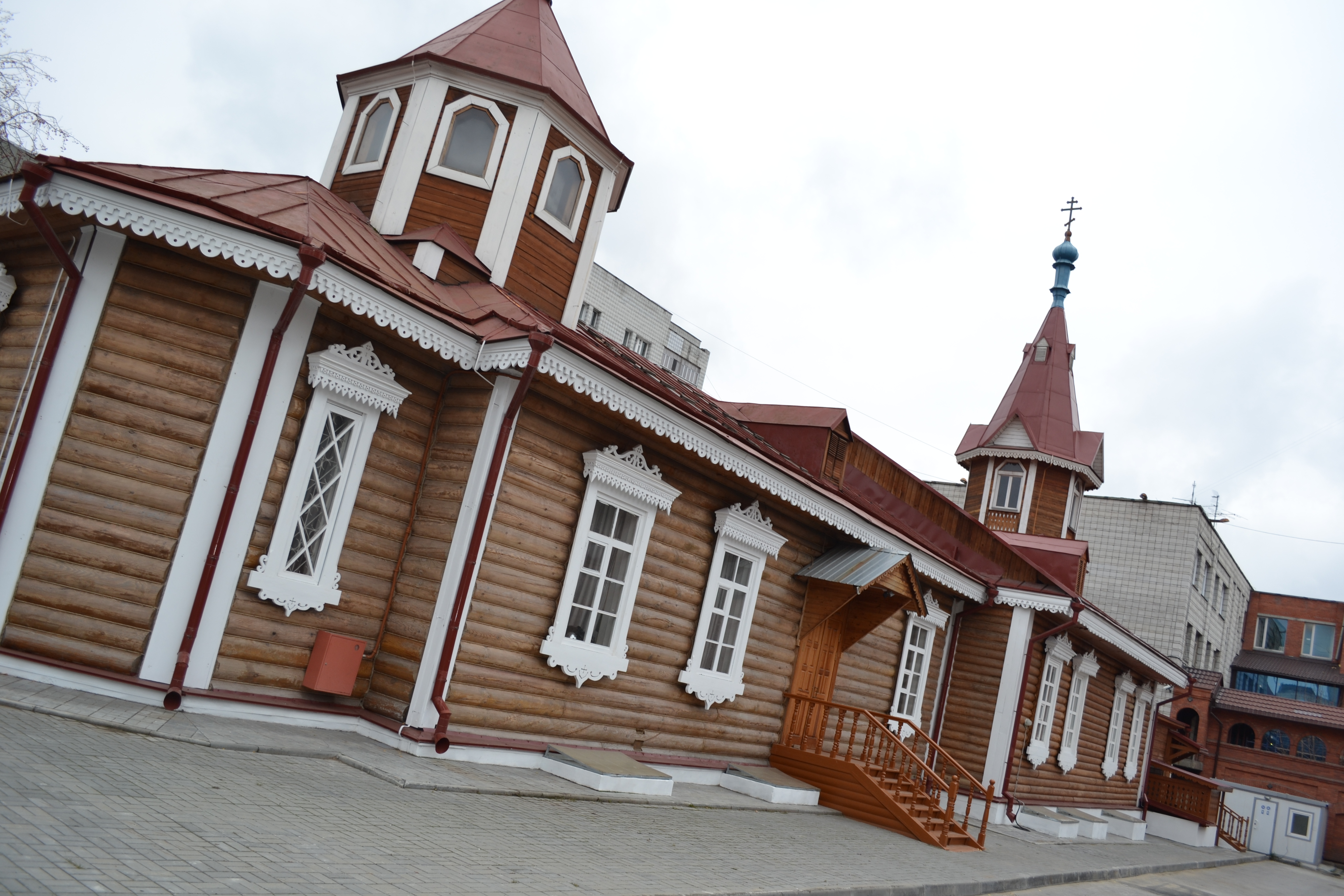

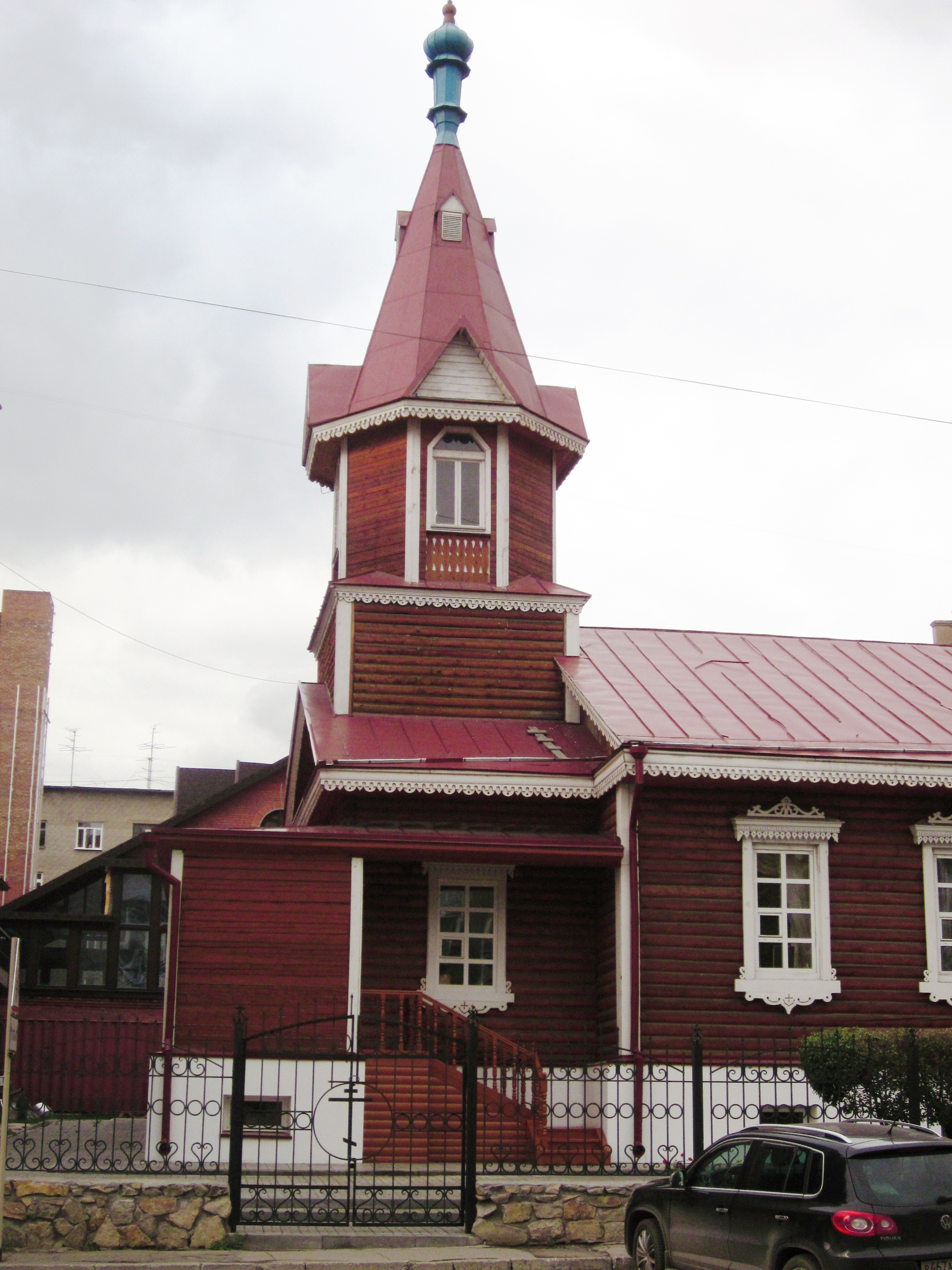
