= Sibirsky Bereg =

Russian snack food manufacturer

- Industry: Snack Food
- Founded: 1999
- Products: rusks, crisps, dried fish

Sibirsky Bereg is a Russian snack food manufacturer based in Novosibirsk in 1999.

In 2009 the company was bought by KDV Group.

== History ==
In 1999, Sibirsky Bereg purchased the production technology for rusk manufacturing from Grand Company (Saint Petersburg) as well as the brand name of this product (Kirieshki).

In June 2004, Sibirskiy Bereg acquired the assets of the Ukrainian chips factory Kristall Plus (Dnipropetrovsk).

In May 2005, Sibirsky Bereg bought 100% of the shares of Bolzhau (snack food company from Kazakhstan).

In 2007, the company built a plant in Tashkent, where it began to produce rusks under the brand name Kirieshki.

In 2009, Tomsk KDV Group bought Sibirsky Bereg.

By the end of 2006 Sibirskiy Bereg's revenue increased by 1.35% to $191 million.

The company's revenue under IFRS increased in 2007 by 17.3% compared to the previous year to $225.2 million, net profit decreased by 0.6% to $9.78 million.

== Owners and management ==
The composition of the owners was not disclosed until the end of May 2007. On May 31, 2007 information about the disclosure of the company's shareholders appeared in the media. As stated in the company's message, 12.5% of the authorized capital belongs to C-Cap Invest PLLC, affiliated with Credit Suisse; the remaining 87.46% belongs to Snack Food Industry Establishment, which is controlled by members of the company's board of directors Yuri An, Alexander Kychakov, Vadim Sukharev and Alexander Ladan.

Since December 7, 2009 Tomsk Camelot-A LLC, affiliated with KDV Group, has become the 100 percent owner of Sibirskiy Bereg International holding.
