= Large Novosibirsk Planetarium =

Planetarium in Novosibirsk, Russia

Coordinates: 54.9809°N 83.0352°E

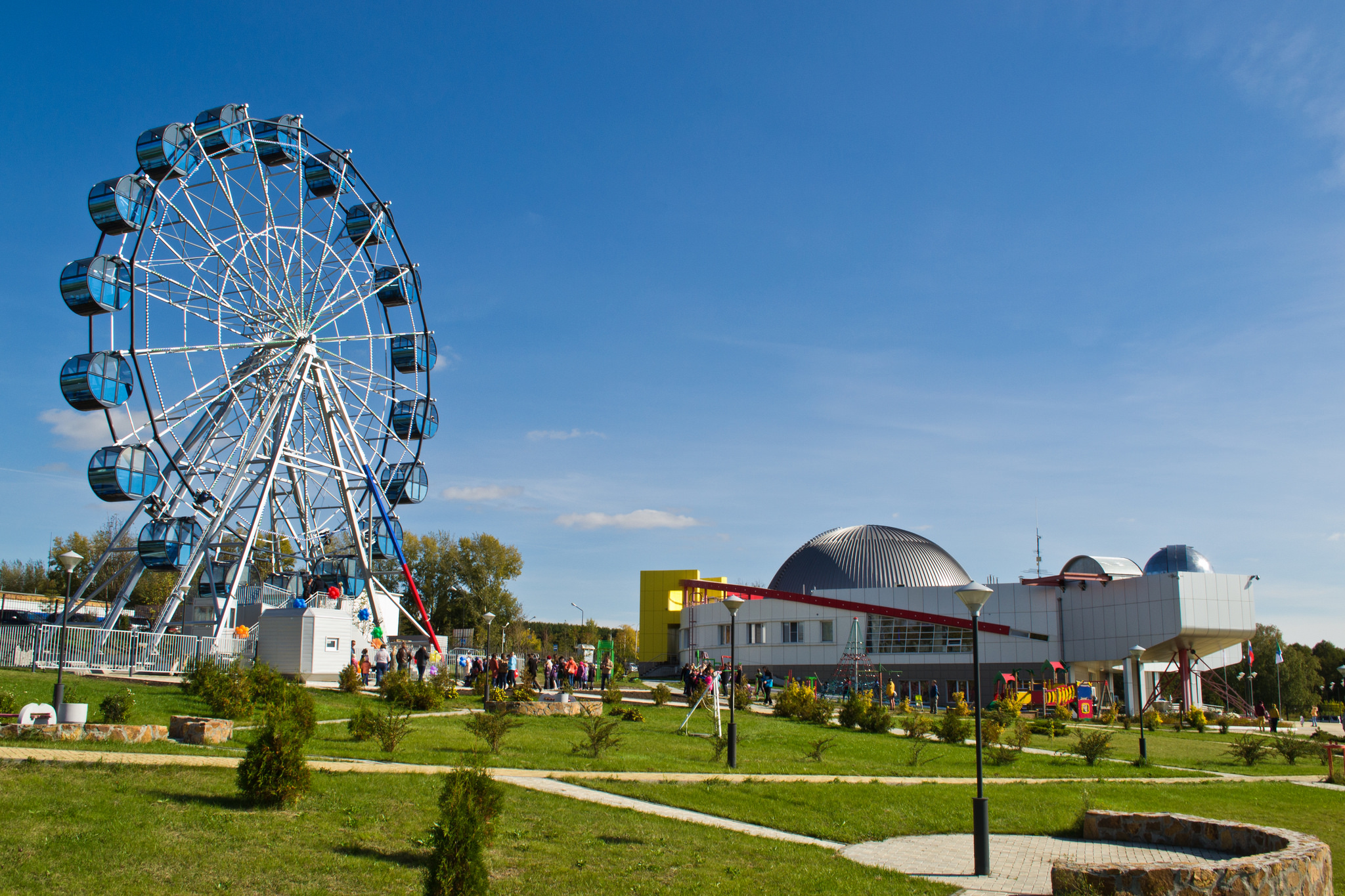

The Large Novosibirsk Planetarium is a planetarium in Oktyabrsky District of Novosibirsk, Russia. It was opened in 2012. The planetarium is located on Klyuch-Kamyshenskoye Plateau.

== History ==
The Novosibirsk Planetarium was officially opened on February 8, 2012.

== Description ==
The planetarium has two floors. Next to the planetarium is a tower with a Foucault pendulum, its length is 15 m.
