= Transfer (travel) =

In travel, a transfer is local travel arranged as part of an itinerary, typically airport to hotel and hotel to hotel. Transfer has some features that distinguish it from ground transportation alternatives. These features are meeting directly in a transport hub, the opportunity to choose a car class and additional options like a baby seat.

== Classification ==
There are few transfer classifications based on

- route:
  - from/to the transport hub
  - intercity
  - to or from sightseeing locations;
- purpose:
  - touristic
  - business;
- number of tourists:
  - individual (one person or family)
  - group (more than four people);
- comfort level:
  - economy
  - comfort
  - premium

The most popular tourist transfers are individual economy class transfers (about 52,3% of all orders).
