= Mikhailovskaya Embankment =

Embankment in Novosibirsk, Russia

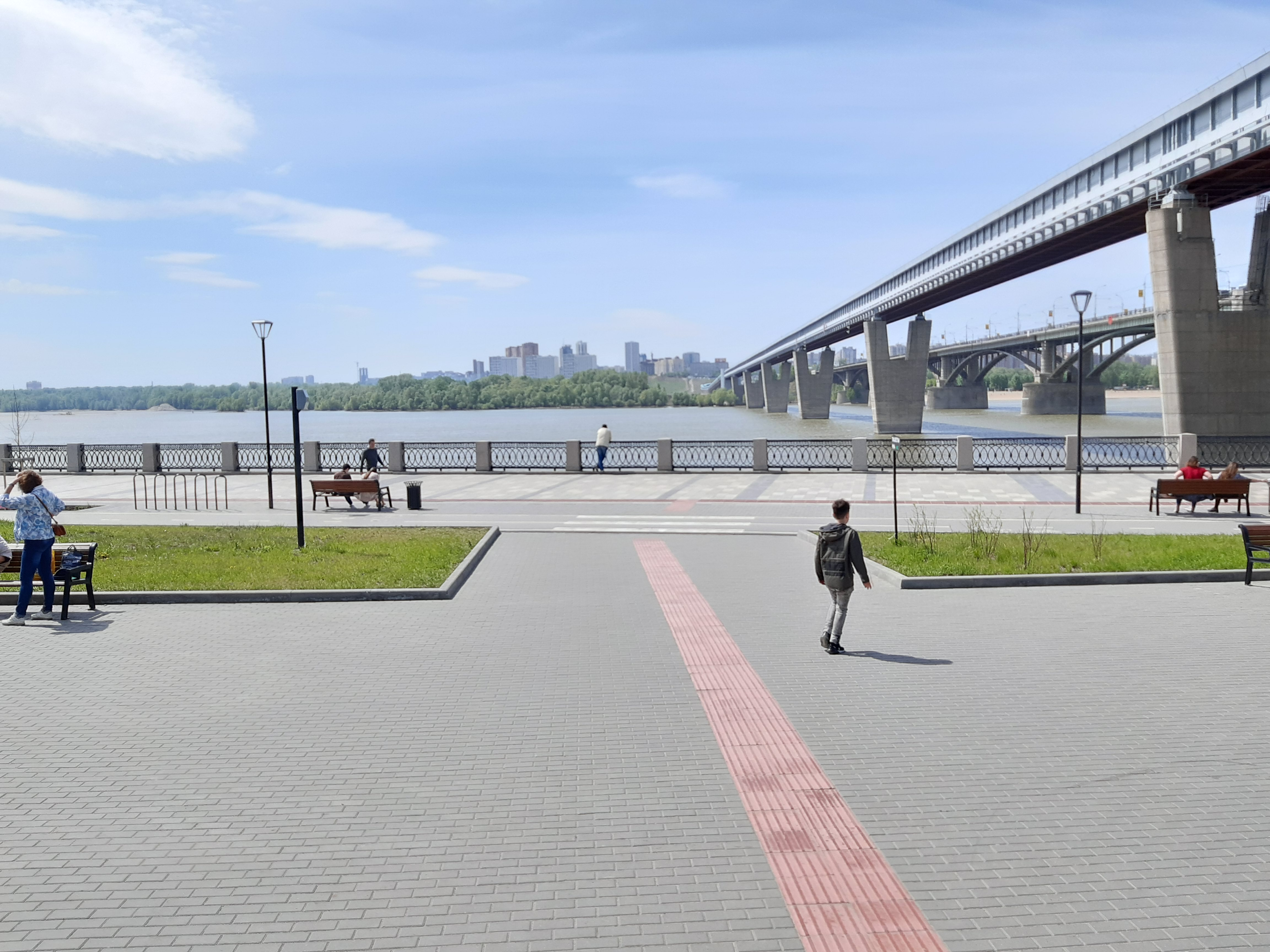
- Native name: Михайловская набережная (Russian)
- Location: Novosibirsk, Russia
- Nearest metro station: Rechnoy Vokzal

Mikhailovskaya Embankment (Russian: Михайловская набережная) is an embankment in Oktyabrsky District of Novosibirsk located between Bolshevistskaya Street and Ob River.

== History ==
Before the creation of the embankment, there was a water-ski station with an outdoor swimming pool and diving towers built in the early 1930s.

In 1981, the Czechoslovak Luna Park ride began to operate on the embankment.

In 2018, the reconstruction of the embankment was completed.

== Holidays ==
Mikhailovskaya Embankment is used for various holidays (Victory Day, Maslenitsa, City Day etc.).

== Points of interest ==
- House of the Cabinet of His Imperial Majesty is a building constructed presumably in the early 1900s. December 9, 1907, Land Transfer Act was signed in the building. The territory that belonged to the Imperial Cabinet had been transferred to the city.
- Monument to the First Railway Bridge across the Ob River. It consists of the span of the Novosibirsk Rail Bridge, dismantled in the 1990s.
- Monument to Alexander III is a monument to the Russian emperor opened in 2012.

== Gallery ==
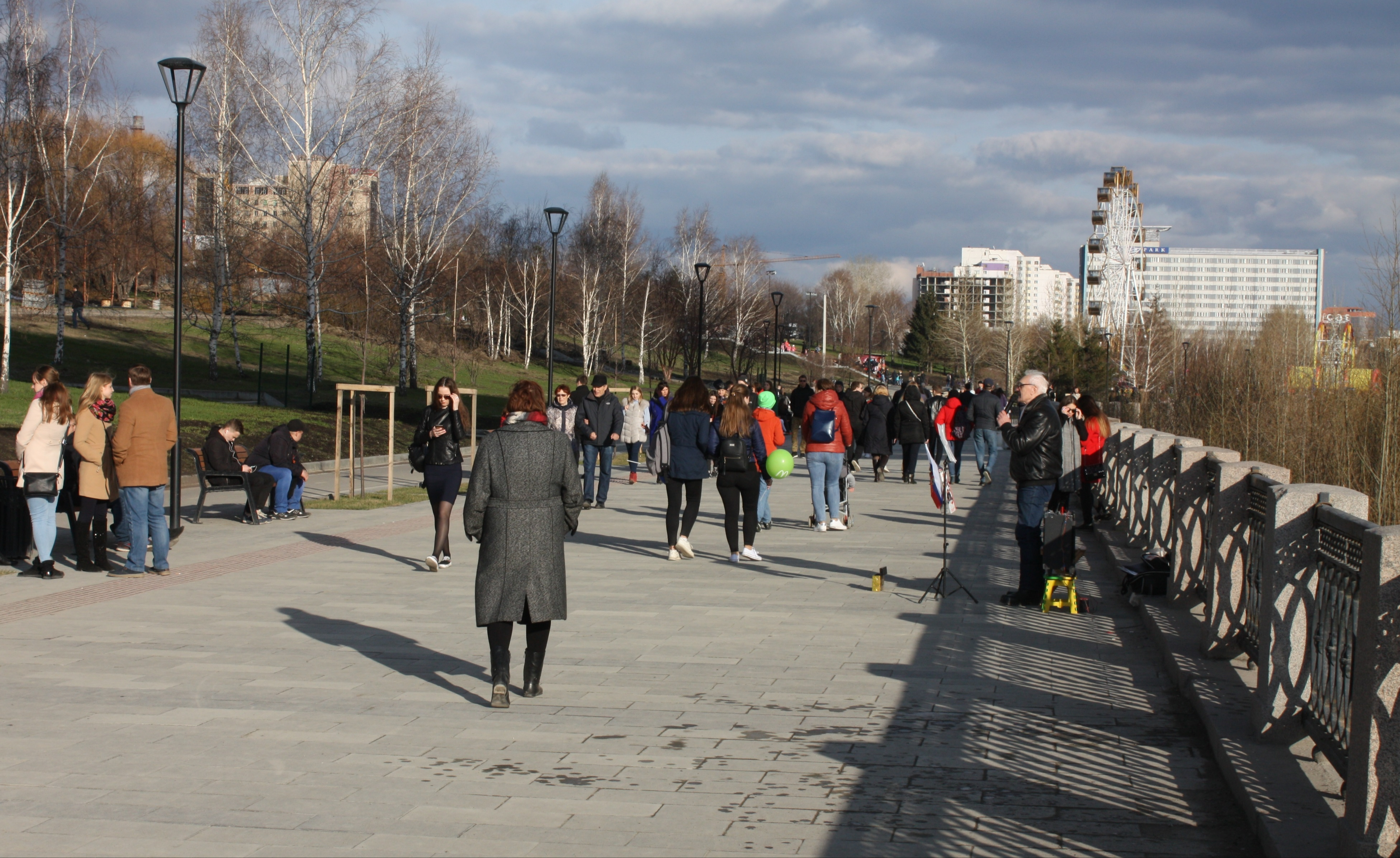

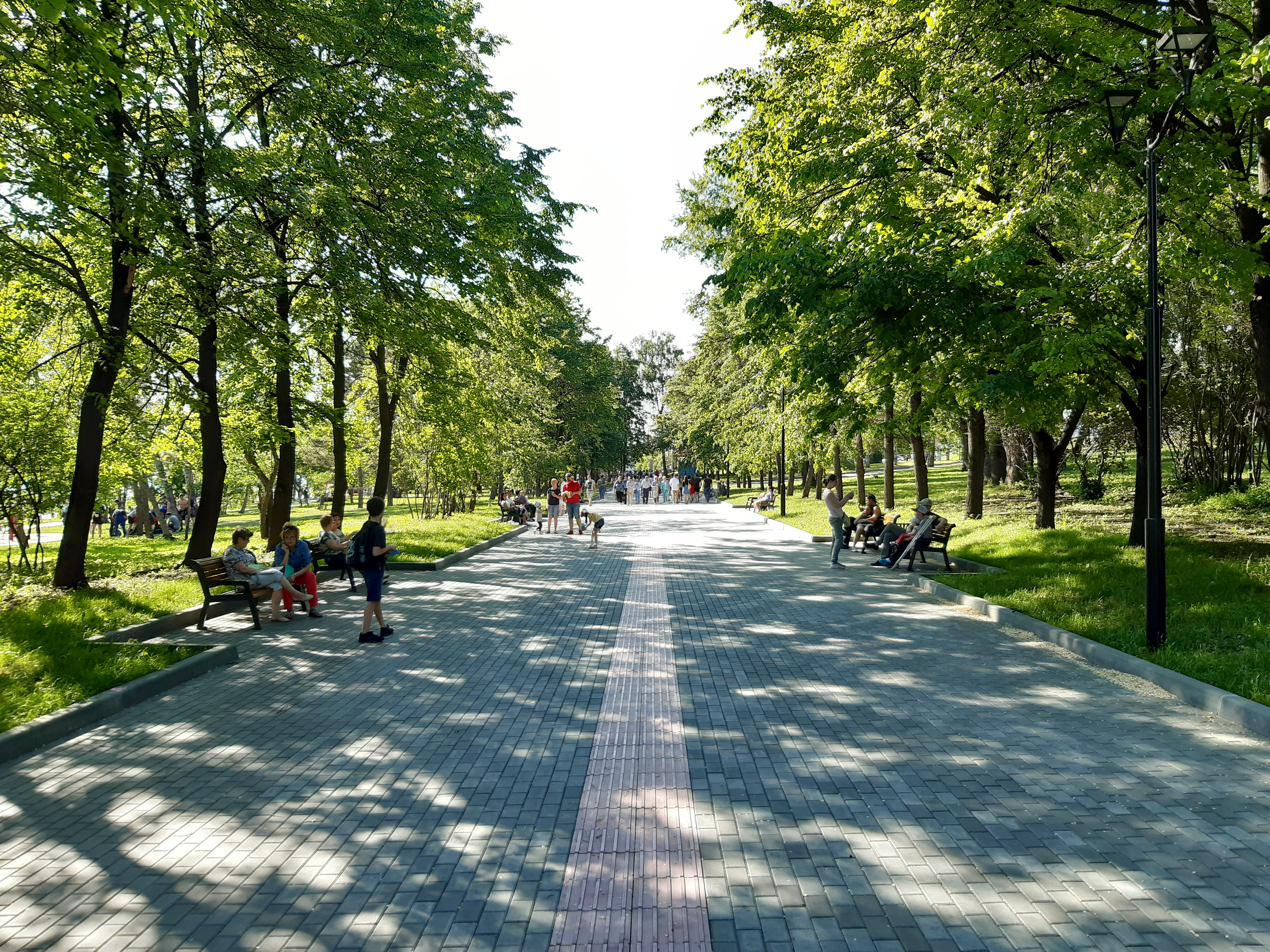

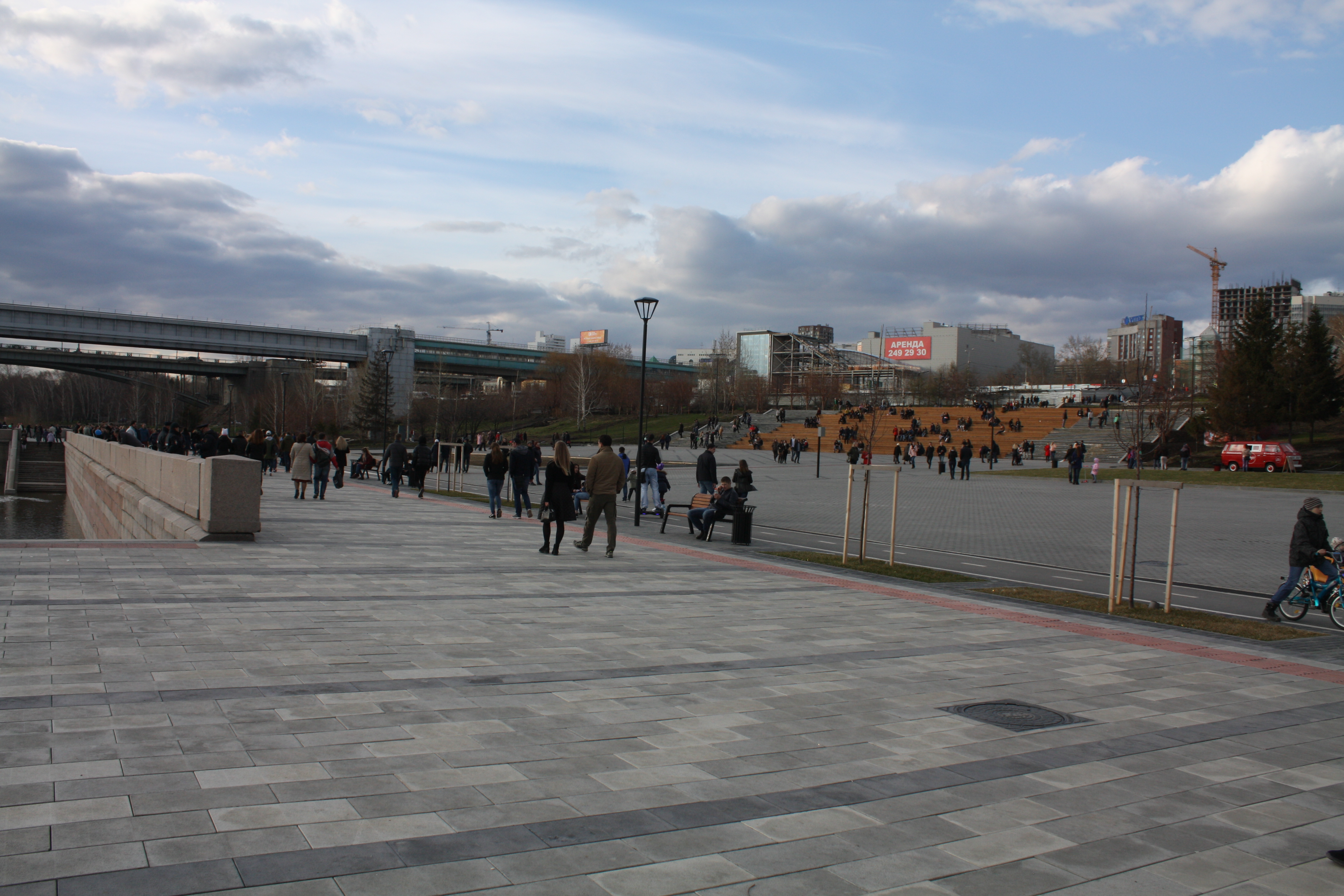

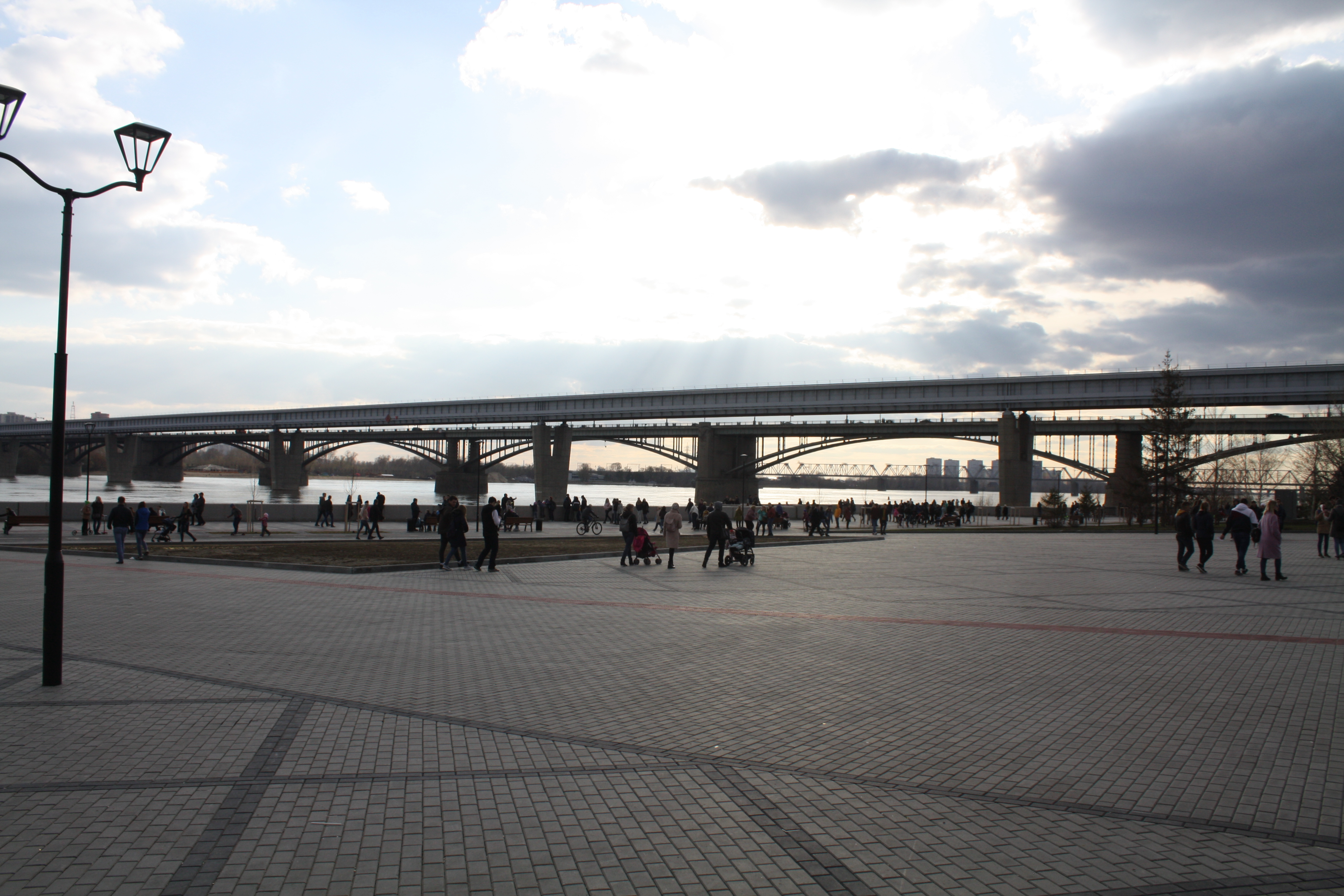

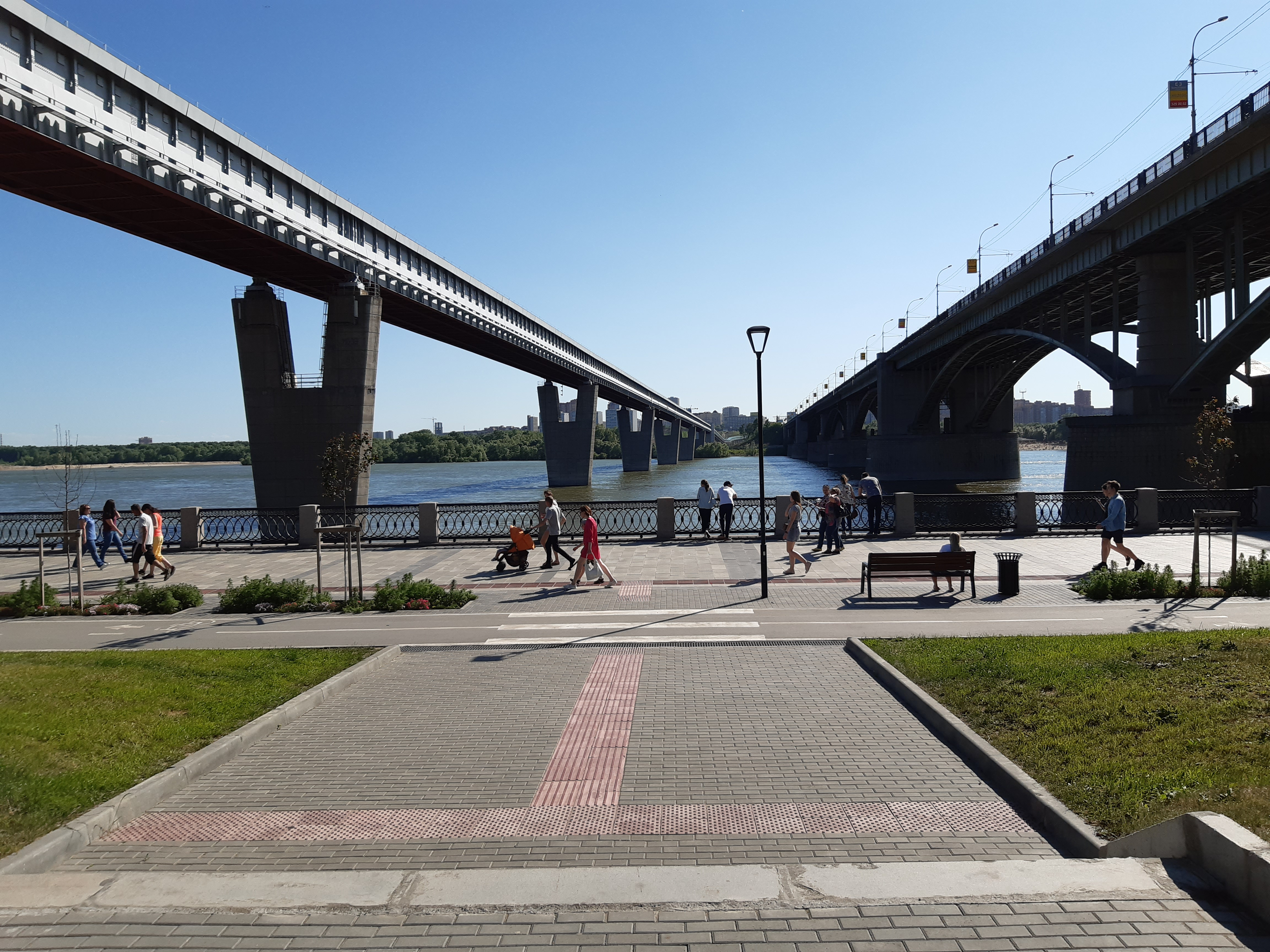
