= Institute of Computational Mathematics and Mathematical Geophysics =

Research institute in Novosibirsk, Russia

Institute of Computational Mathematics and Mathematical Geophysics of the Siberian Branch of the RAS
- Established: 1964
- Director: Mikhail Marchenko
- Owner: Siberian Branch of RAS
- Address: Lavrentyev Prospekt 6, Novosibirsk, 630090, Russia
- Location: Novosibirsk, Russia
- Website: icmmg.nsc.ru

Institute of Computational Mathematics and Mathematical Geophysics of the Siberian Branch of the RAS, ICMMG SB RAS (Russian: Институт вычислительной математики и математической геофизики СО РАН) is a research institute in Novosibirsk, Russia. It was founded in 1964.

== History ==
On January 1, 1964, the Computing Center was established in Novosibirsk, later it was transformed into the Institute of Computational Mathematics and Mathematical Geophysics. In 2004, the institute has created an Expert Database on Tsunami Observations in the Pacific Ocean containing information on 1500 tsunamigenic events that have occurred in the Pacific region between 47 BC and 2003.

== Activities ==
Research in the field of mathematical modeling of oceanic and atmospheric physics, environmental protection, geophysics, telecommunication systems and software for supercomputers etc.

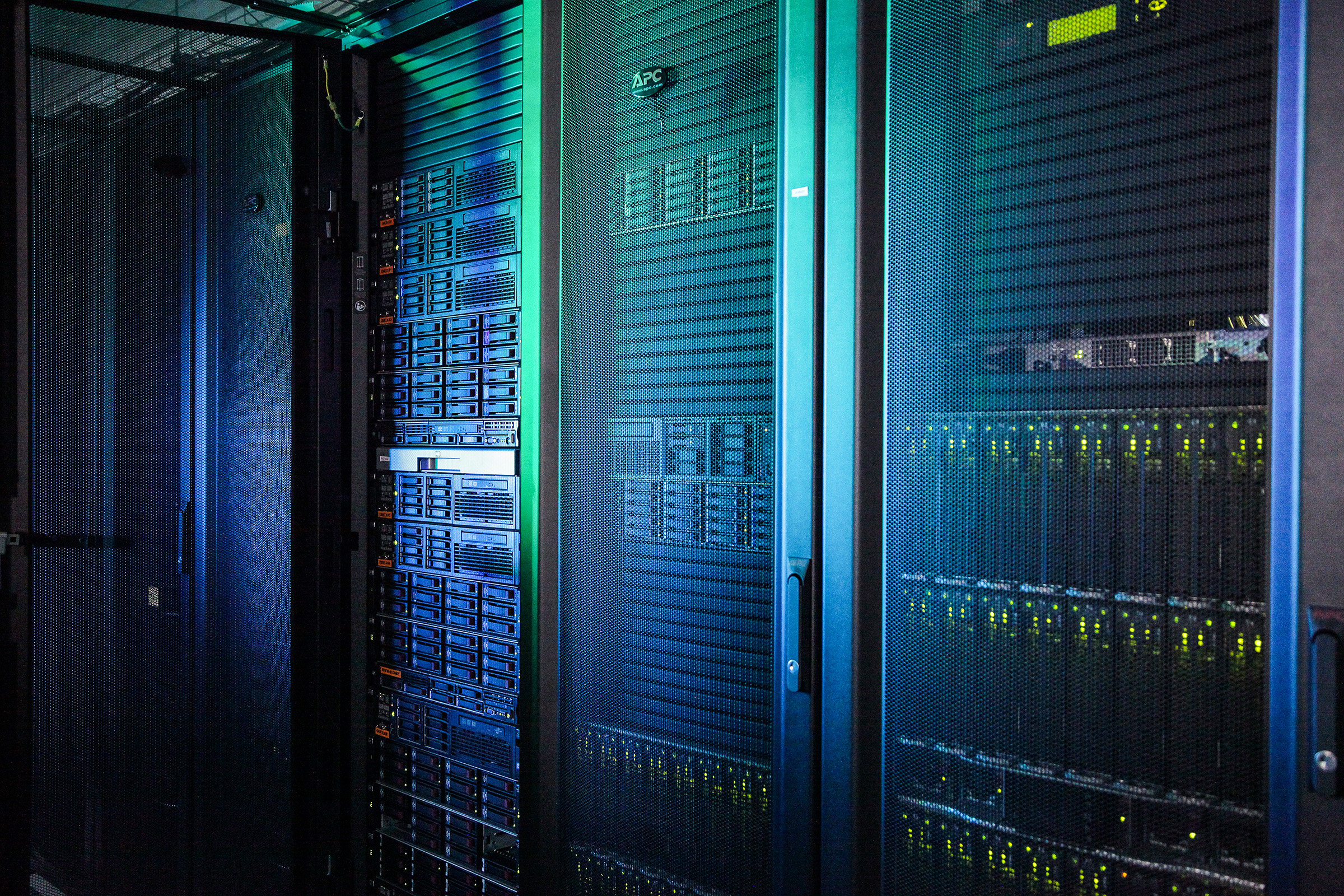
NKS-30T supercomputer installed at the Siberian Supercomputer Center of the Institute.
