= Rich Family (company) =

Russian retailer

- Industry: Children's retail
- Founded: 2002
- Headquarters: Novosibirsk, Russia
- Products: toys

Rich Family is a Russian children's retailer headquartered in Novosibirsk. It was founded in 2002. Chain stores operate in Russia and Kazakhstan.

== History ==
The company was founded in 2002 in Novosibirsk.

On September 20, 2019, the company opened a hypermarket in Moscow.

== Locations ==
The company's hypermarkets are located in large cities from the Russian Far East to the Volga Region and also in Kazakhstan (Almaty).

== Hypermarkets ==
The average area of hypermarkets is 3.8 thousand m². The area of the hypermarket on Mochischenskoye Highway in Novosibirsk is 4.7 thousand m².

== Finance ==
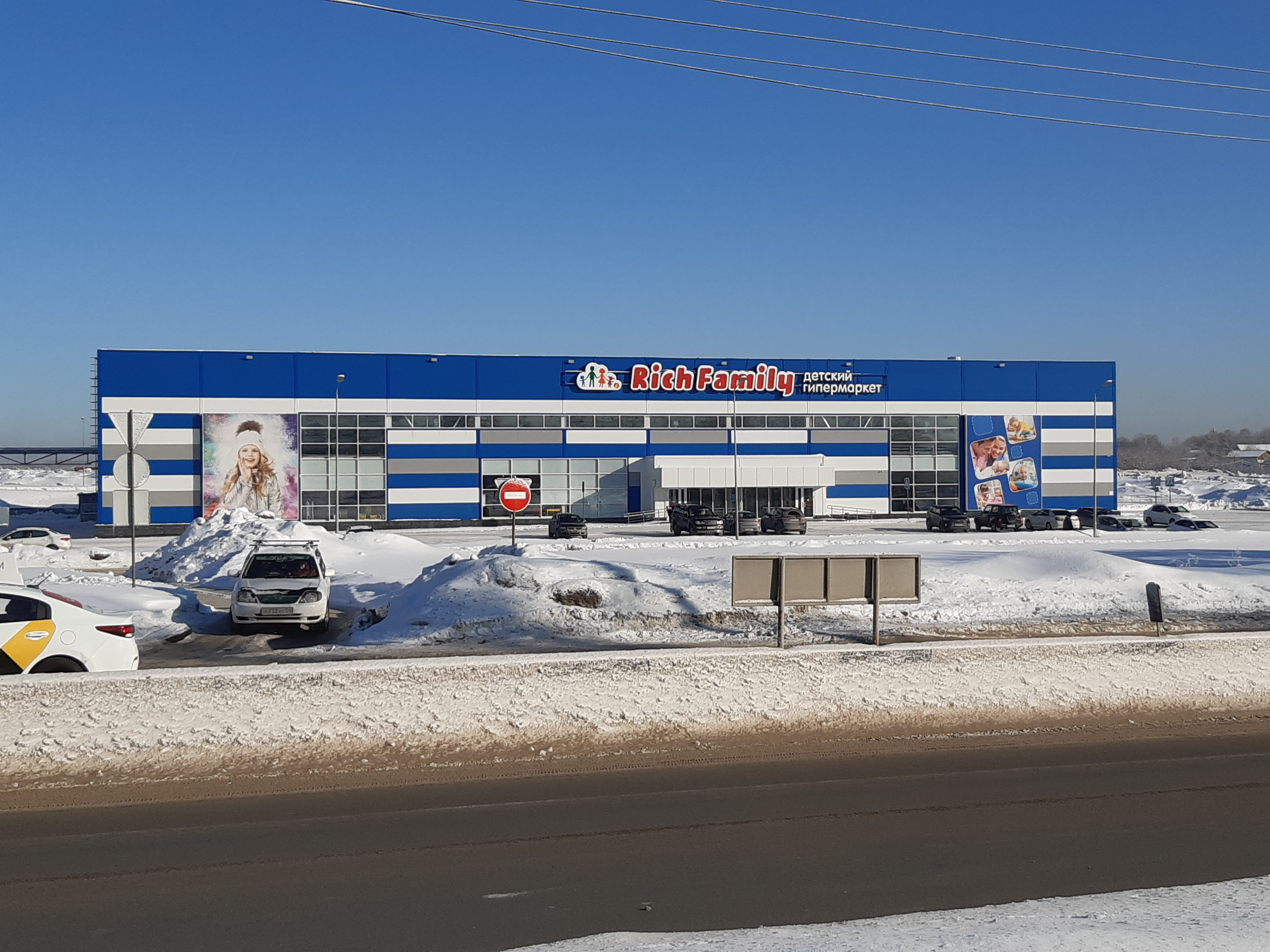
Hypermarket on Mochischenskoye Highway in Novosibirsk

=== Revenue ===
In 2017, the company took 5th place in revenue among the largest Russian children's retailers after the Detsky Mir, Dochki & Synochki, Korablik and Mothercare.

==== Revenue from 2012 to 2017 ====
- 2012 — 2,11 billions ₽
- 2013 — 3,57 billions ₽
- 2014 — 5,43 billions ₽
- 2015 — 7,4 billions ₽
- 2016 — 8,9 billions ₽
- 2017 — 10,7 billions ₽

=== Net profit ===
In 2017, the company's net profit amounted to 1.8 billion rubles.

== Ratings ==
In 2016, Rich Family entered the RBC rating of "50 fastest growing companies in Russia", taking 49th position. In 2017, in the same rating, the company took 35th place.
