= House of Lenin =

Coordinates: 55°01′40.5″N 82°55′20″E

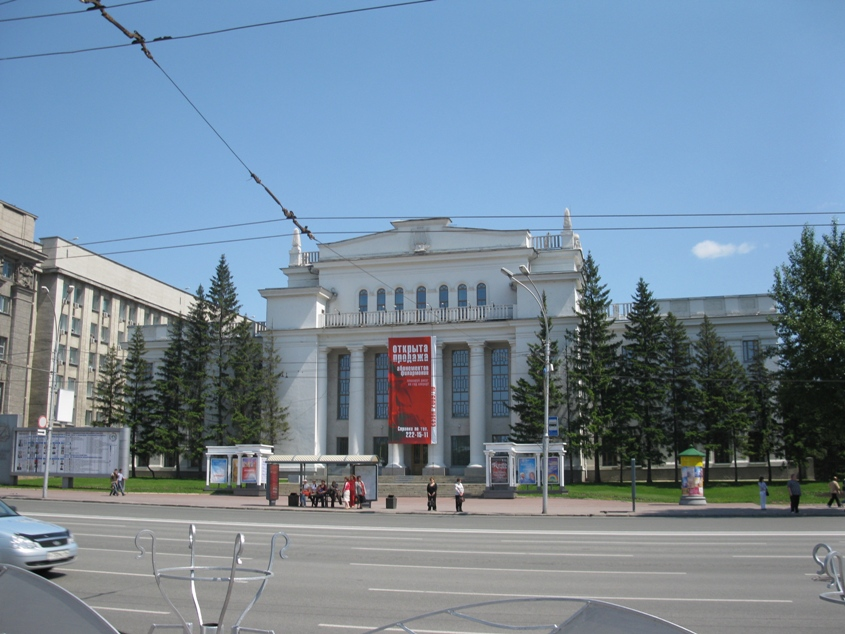
House of Lenin, Philharmonic Chamber hall

House of Lenin, currently Philharmonic Chamber hall, is a building in Novosibirsk, located at Krasniy Prospect, 32. C.

== History ==
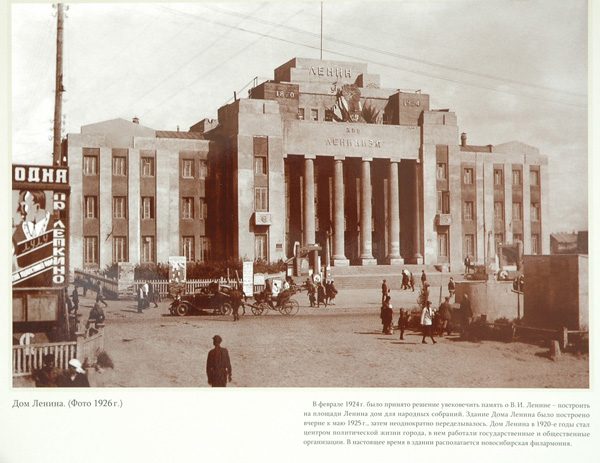
House of Lenin, 1926

After the death of Vladimir Lenin the residents of Novosibirsk decided to commemorate Lenin's legacy. On February 10, 1924, it was decided to build a house monument. The ground-breaking ceremony occurred on July 13, 1924, and the building was completed in 1926. Originally the building had elements of the Lenin's Mausoleum incorporated into its facade; however, they haven't survived the later reconstructions.

In 1930–1985, Novosibirsk Theater of youth was located in the House of Lenin.

The building was reconstructed in 1937-1938 and 1943–1944 to transform its original "revolutionary" shape into a more classical theatrical building. In 1970 a wall of the building facing Monument to the Heroes of the Revolution was decorated with revolution-themed images.

Finally, in 1985, the theater moved to a new building and the House of Lenin was converted into Philharmonic Chamber hall.

== See also ==
- 100-Flat Building
- Sibrevcom Building
- City Trade House
