= Monument to the Heroes of the Revolution =

Memorial in Novosibirsk, Russia

Coordinates: 55.028°N 82.924°E

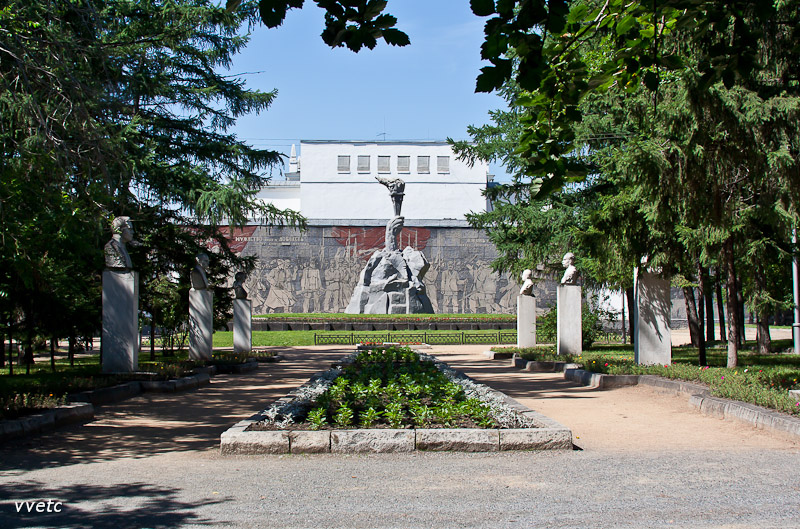
Vladimir Kolesnikov. The main alley

The Monument to the Heroes of the Revolution is a memorial located in the very center of Novosibirsk, Russia.

Originally, it was a place where 104 fighters for the Soviet Revolution were buried in a common grave on January 22, 1920. A monument was erected and officially opened on November 7, 1922. In 1957, the remains of a few famous heroes of the Soviet Revolution were moved from the other city cemeteries and buried in the individual graves with bust sculptures.

In 1970, the wall of the building facing the cemetery (House of Lenin, another Soviet era landmark built after the death of Vladimir Lenin to commemorate his memory) was decorated with revolutionary themed images. Finally, a few more graves were added in 1977.

The memorial was a major landmark in Soviet days and most children in Novosibirsk have visited the site on school field trips.

By the mid-1990s it had become neglected and it has not been modified. As a result, this is arguably one of the most authentic and best preserved examples of an original untouched Soviet era historic site.
