= Sugar Riot =

1916 food riot in Russia

Sugar Riot was a riot that occurred in Novonikolayevsk, Russia, on 9 November 1916. The unrest was the result of shortage of sugar.

== Background ==
During World War I, rationing was introduced, and food distribution was often delayed.

In early November 1916, Novonikolayevsk received a shipment of sugar. Then an announcement was made that sugar will be issued from November 9 (3 pounds per person). But it soon became known that half of the products belong to cooperatives. Then the city government made an announcement in the press that sugar distribution is off.

== Riot ==
On 9 November a crowd of women began to gather in front of the food store of the city government, which was located at Bazarnaya Square.

The Novonikolayevsk Police led by the police chief G. P. Bukhartovsky dispersed the crowd. However, soon the crowd began to gather again. According to the Governor, protesters returned thanks to incitement by new recruits and two lower ranks who returned only recently from the battlefields.

Then, to suppress the crowd, military reinforcements of 25 people arrived under the command of staff captain Nikitin.

After some time, Bukhartovsky was injured by several stones. He requested Nikitin to take the necessary measures to quell the riot and left the place of protests.

Then, several warning shots were fired, but it didn't scare the protesters. People went towards the store of the Siberian Partnership, smashed the window panes and entered into the store, where they began robbing products. However, police and soldiers were able to prevent further looting of the shop. During the defense of the Siberian Partnership, Nikitin was injured by a rock to the head after which he transferred command to the ensign and left Bazarnaya Square.

Some time later, the number of rioters increases to several thousands. Reinforcements arrived from the local military team, led by Lt. Col. Nekrasov, but, despite the assistance, the crowd swept away the defense, broke the doors and windows of the store and began to rob sugar. Then Nekrasov ordered to shoot at protesters, as a result of which one woman died and five people were injured (of which one woman died in the hospital later).

After some time, four training teams of 250 people led by Lieutenant General Kotsurik arrive and drive back the crowd, but the protesters continued to rob other retail outlets of private entrepreneurs, as well as the shops of the Ekonomia Consumer Society.

== Damage ==
During the riot, 400 pounds of sugar were stolen. The damage from the mass robbery of the Siberian Partnership amounted to 10,000 rubles.

== Judicial proceedings ==
After the riots, 74 people were detained, 54 of them were women. 23 people were taken into custody and sentenced by the Omsk Judicial Chamber to various prison terms.

== Bibliography ==
- Ламин В. А. (2003). Энциклопедия. Новосибирск. Новосибирск: Новосибирское книжное издательство. p. 757. ISBN 5-7620-0968-8.
