= City Clinical Hospital No. 1 (Novosibirsk) =

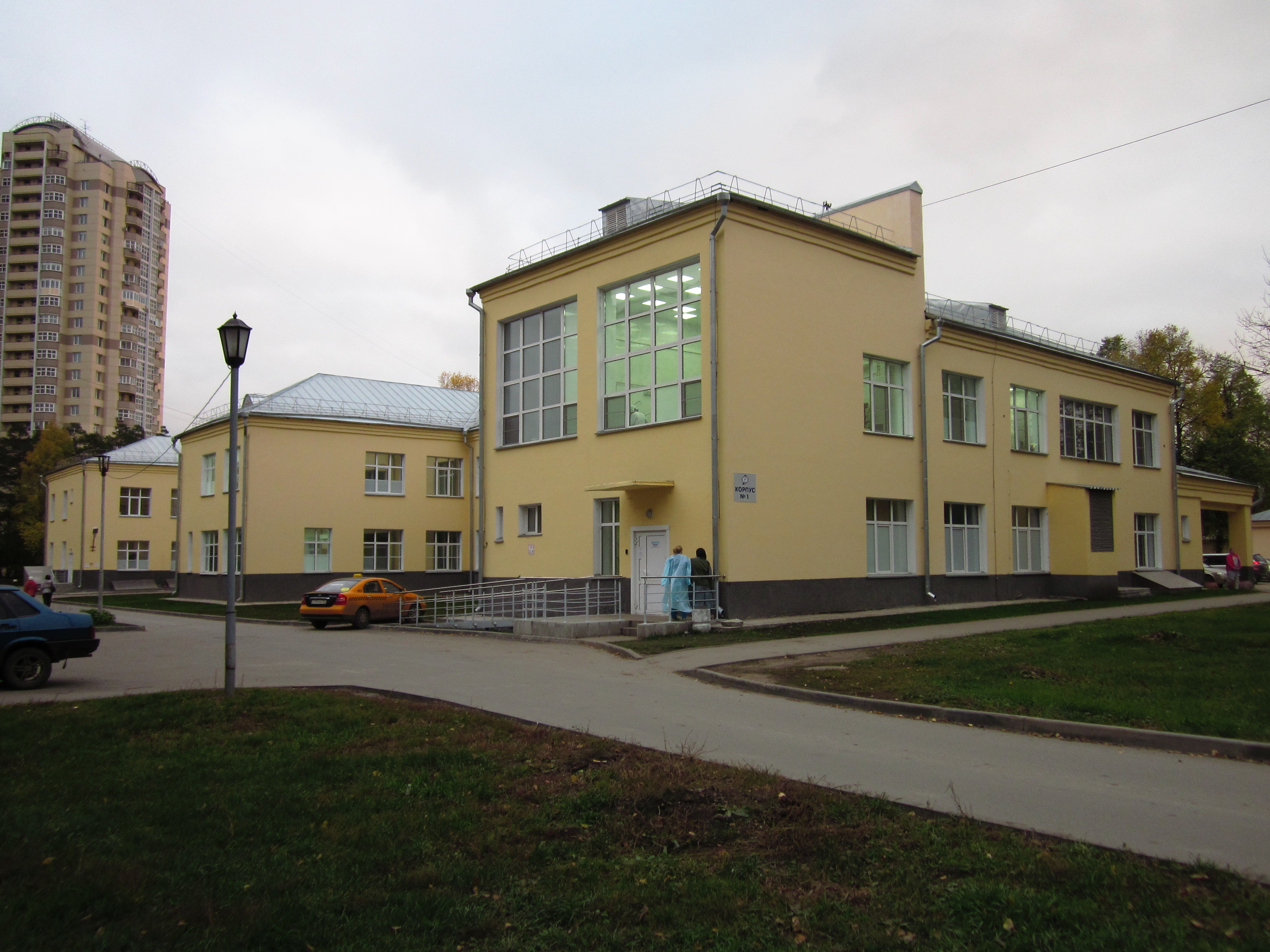

Geography
- Location: Novosibirsk, Russia

History
- Founded: 1930

City Clinical Hospital No. 1 (Russian: Городская клиническая больница № 1) is a hospital in Zayeltsovsky District of Novosibirsk, Russia. It was founded in 1930. Many hospital buildings are built in the constructivist style.

== History ==
In 1930, treatment building No 3 was built.

In the early 1930s, British writer Robert Byron appreciated the hospital buildings.

In 1967, the main medical building was constructed.

In the 1990s, an operating and resuscitation medical building was built.

== Famous medics ==
V. M. Mysh, A. L. Myasnikov, N. I. Gorizontov, A. V. Triumfov, N. A. Bogolepov, G. D. Zalessky, A. A. Kolen, D. T. Kuimov and others.

== Bibliography ==
- Ламин В. А. (2003). Энциклопедия. Новосибирск. Новосибирск: Новосибирское книжное издательство. p. 108. ISBN 5-7620-0968-8.
