= Boreskov Institute of Catalysis =

Research institute in Novosibirsk, Russia

Boreskov Institute of Catalysis of the Siberian Branch of the RAS
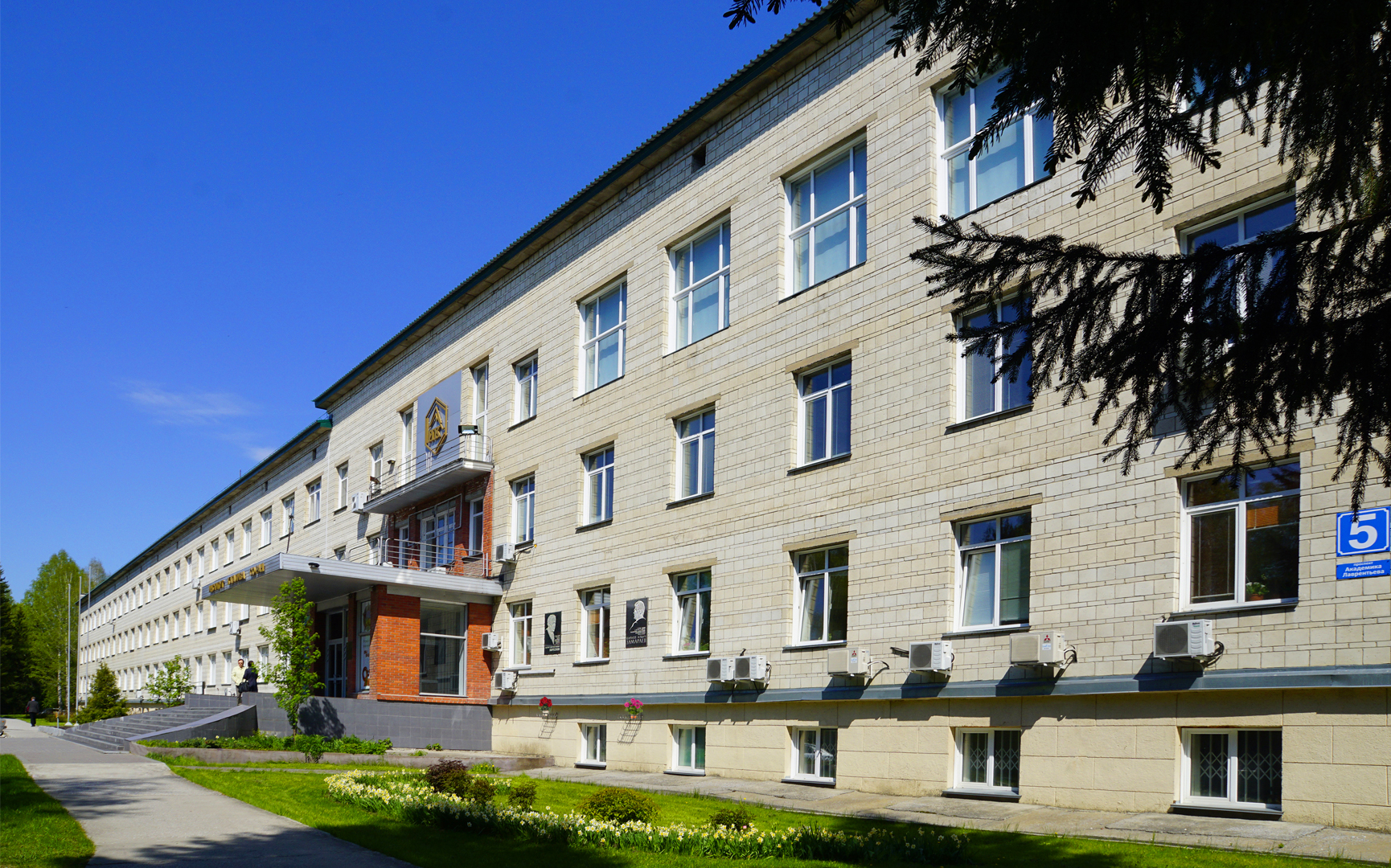
- Established: 1958
- Director: Valery Bukhtiyarov
- Owner: Siberian Branch of RAS
- Address: Lavrentyev Prospekt 5, Novosibirsk, 630090, Russia
- Location: Novosibirsk, Russia
- Website: catalysis.ru

Boreskov Institute of Catalysis of the Siberian Branch of the RAS, BIC (Russian: Институт катализа имени Г. К. Борескова Сибирского отделения Российской академии наук, ИК СО РАН) is a research institute in Novosibirsk, Russia. It was founded in 1958.

== History ==
The Institute of Catalysis was founded in the summer of 1958 as part of the Siberian Branch of the USSR Academy of Sciences. The establishment of the institute was preceded by the Decree of the Plenum of the Central Committee of the CPSU of May 7, 1958 "On the accelerated development of the chemical industry and especially the production of synthetic materials and products from them to meet the needs of the population and the needs of the national economy".

Until 1984, the head of the organization was Academician Georgy Boreskov, a scientist in the field of catalysis and chemical technology. In 1991, the institute was named after him.

== Activities ==
Fundamentals for the preparation of catalysts; basis of homogeneous, heterogeneous catalysis, as well as catalysis with enzymes; development of new catalysts, improvement of existing catalysts and catalytic processes; chemical engineering and mathematical modeling of catalytic processes, automation for catalytic research. The BIC SB RAS develops biofuel from sawdust and algae and produces nanotubes.

The institute produces aerogels, including a multilayer aerogel for measuring the velocity of elementary particles.
