= Water Tower No. 2 (Novosibirsk) =

- Водонапорная башня № 2
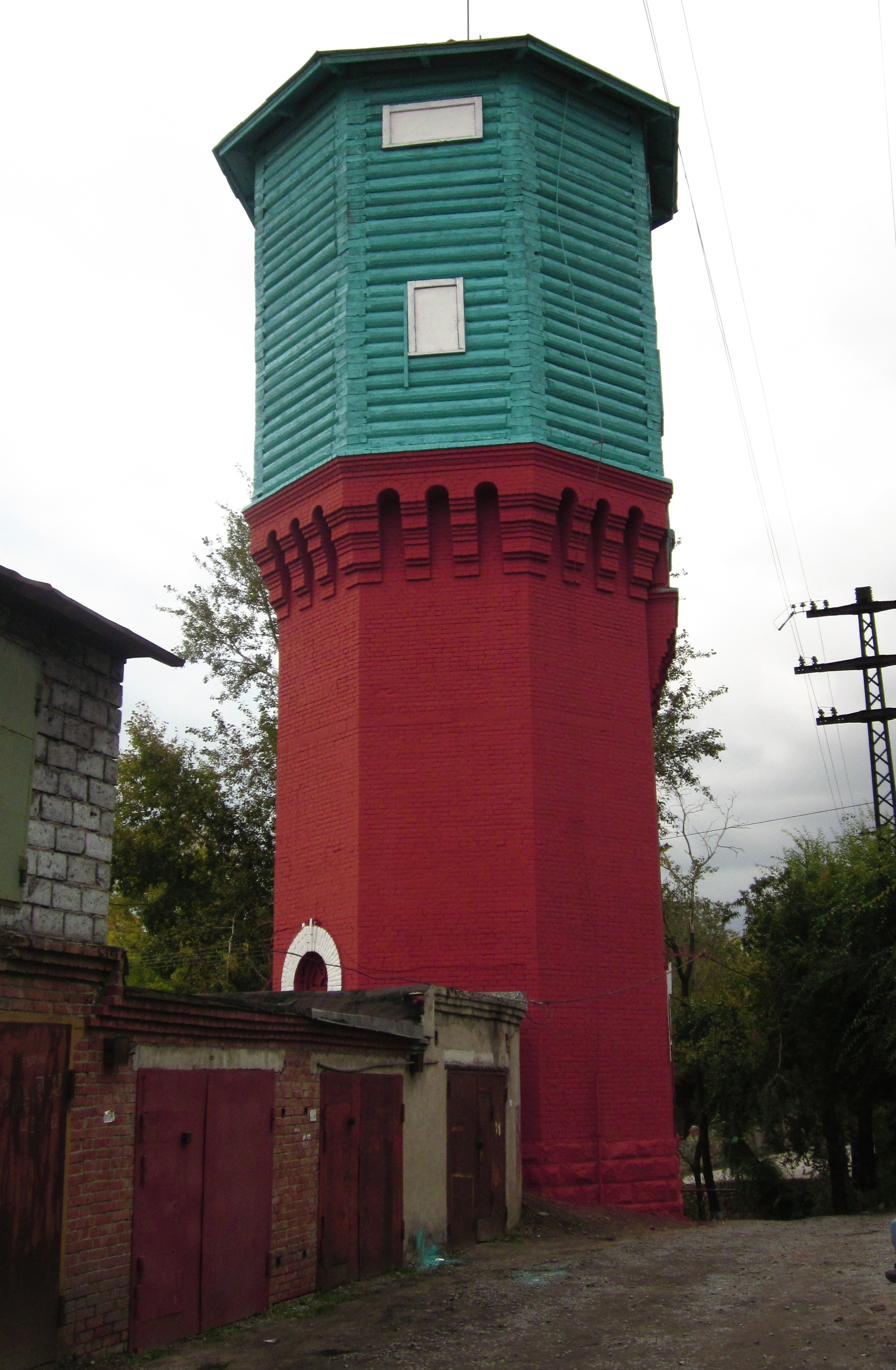
- Interactive map of the Water Tower No. 2 area

General information
- Type: Water tower
- Location: Novosibirsk, Russia
- Coordinates: 55°01′51″N 82°53′48″E
- Completed: 1902

Water Tower No. 2 (Russian: Водонапорная башня № 2) is an octagonal water tower in Zheleznodorozhny District of Novosibirsk, Russia. It was built in 1902.

== Description ==
The tower was built of brick and wood, has three tiers and stands on a rusticated plinth of granite stones.

== Bibliography ==
- Воеводина Т.В., Грес М. В., Минов И. Г. etc. (2011). Памятники истории, архитектуры и монументального искусства Новосибирской области (PDF). Новосибирск: ПК «ДЕАЛ». p. 279. ISBN 978-5-8402-0368-2.
