= Alexander Fyodorovich Kugayevsky =

Soviet electrical engineer and inventor

- Александр Фёдорович Кугаевский
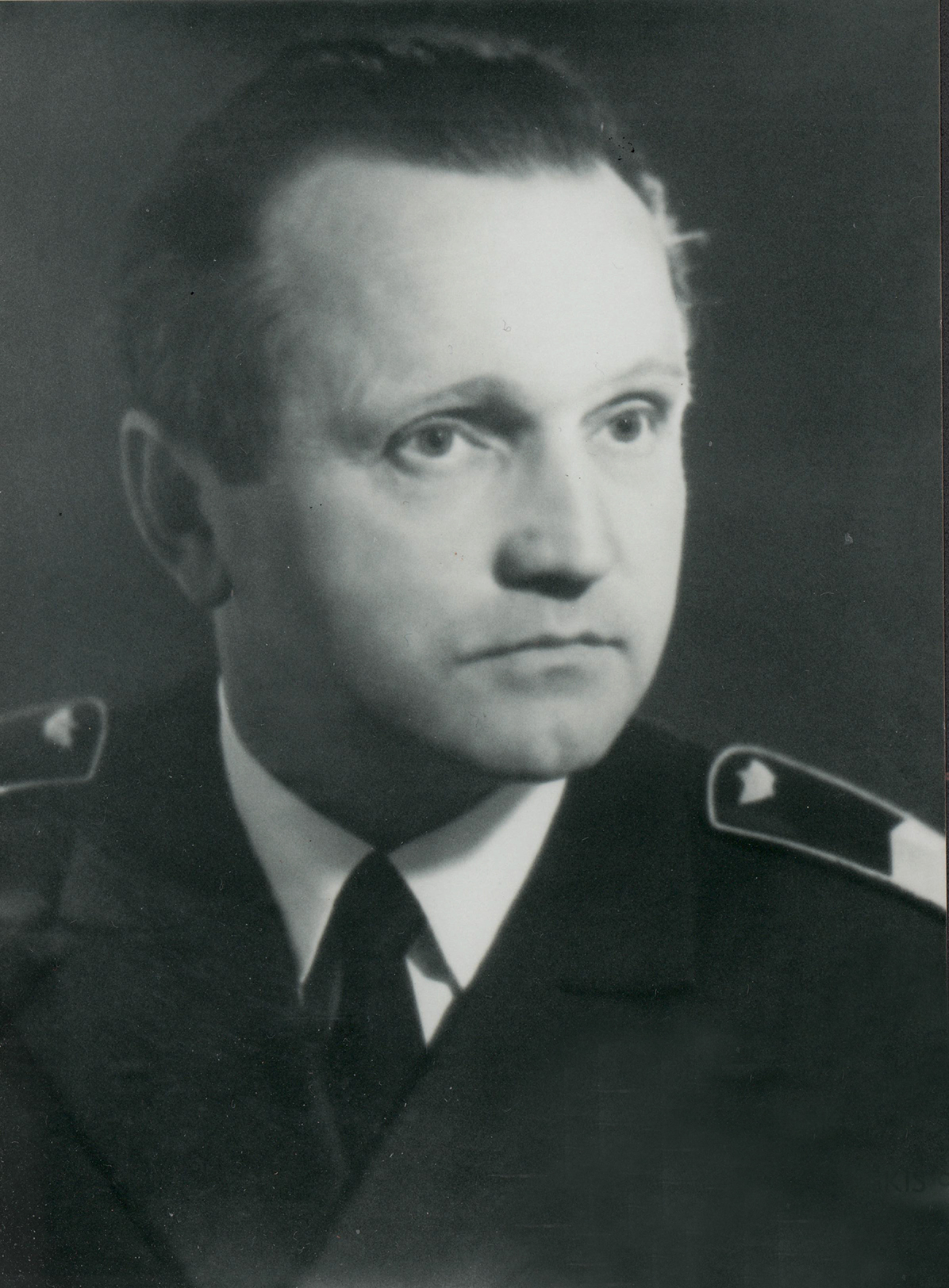
- Alexander F. Kugayevsky
- Born: October 25, 1930; Maloye Kugayevo, Tobolsky District, Tyumen Oblast, Russian SFSR, Soviet Union
- Died: September 27, 1992 (aged 61); Riga, Latvia
- Citizenship: Soviet Union
- Education: Novosibirsk Electrotechnical Institute of Communications
- Known for: Measurement methods for electromagnetic material properties
- Awards: Order of the Red Banner of Labour
- Scientific career
- Fields: Electrical engineering, radio engineering measurements
- Workplaces: Siberian Scientific Research Institute of Metrology; Riga Civil Aviation Engineers Institute

Alexander Fyodorovich Kugayevsky (Russian: Александр Фёдорович Кугаевский; 25 October 1930 – 27 September 1992) was a Soviet scientist, electrical engineer, inventor, and professor specializing in electrical engineering and radio engineering measurements.

== Biography ==
Alexander Kugayevsky was born on 25 October 1930 in the village of Maloye Kugayevo, Tobolsky District, Tyumen Oblast, Soviet Union.

In 1958, he graduated from the Novosibirsk Electrotechnical Institute of Communications. Beginning in 1956, while still a student, he worked at the Siberian Scientific Research Institute of Metrology (SNIIM) in Novosibirsk. Between 1960 and 1975, he served as acting director and head of department at the institute.

In 1976, he moved to Riga. From 1976 to 1985, he served as head of the Department of Electrical Engineering at the Riga Red Banner Institute of Civil Aviation Engineers (RKIIGA). From 1985 to 1989, he continued working at the institute as a professor.

He died on 27 September 1992 in Riga.

== Scientific activity ==
Kugayevsky developed methods for determining the electromagnetic properties of materials and designed equipment for operation across a wide frequency range. He authored scientific works, including monographs, and held at least 25 patents for inventions.

In 1963, he defended his Candidate of Technical Sciences dissertation titled Methods and Equipment for Maintaining Uniformity in Measurements of Magnetic Material Parameters at High Frequencies.

In 1970, he defended his Doctor of Technical Sciences dissertation titled Methods and Equipment for Measuring Electromagnetic Characteristics of Standard Ferromagnetic Samples at High and Ultra-High Frequencies.

== Selected works ==
- Kugayevsky, A. F. (1973). Measurement of Parameters of Ferromagnetic Materials at High Frequencies. Moscow: Standards Publishing House.
- Kugayevsky, A. F. (1974). Modern Methods for Measuring Electromagnetic Characteristics of Soft Magnetic Materials at HF and UHF Frequencies. Moscow.
- Kugayevsky, A. F.; Liventsev, F. D.; Snitko, Yu. F. (1965). Methods and Equipment for Measuring Characteristics of Ferromagnetic Materials at High Frequencies. Moscow.

== Awards ==
- Order of the Red Banner of Labour
- Two Silver Medals of VDNKh (1963 and 1968)
- Bronze Medal of VDNKh
