= Resettlement Center, Novonikolayevsk =

Former migrant assistance center

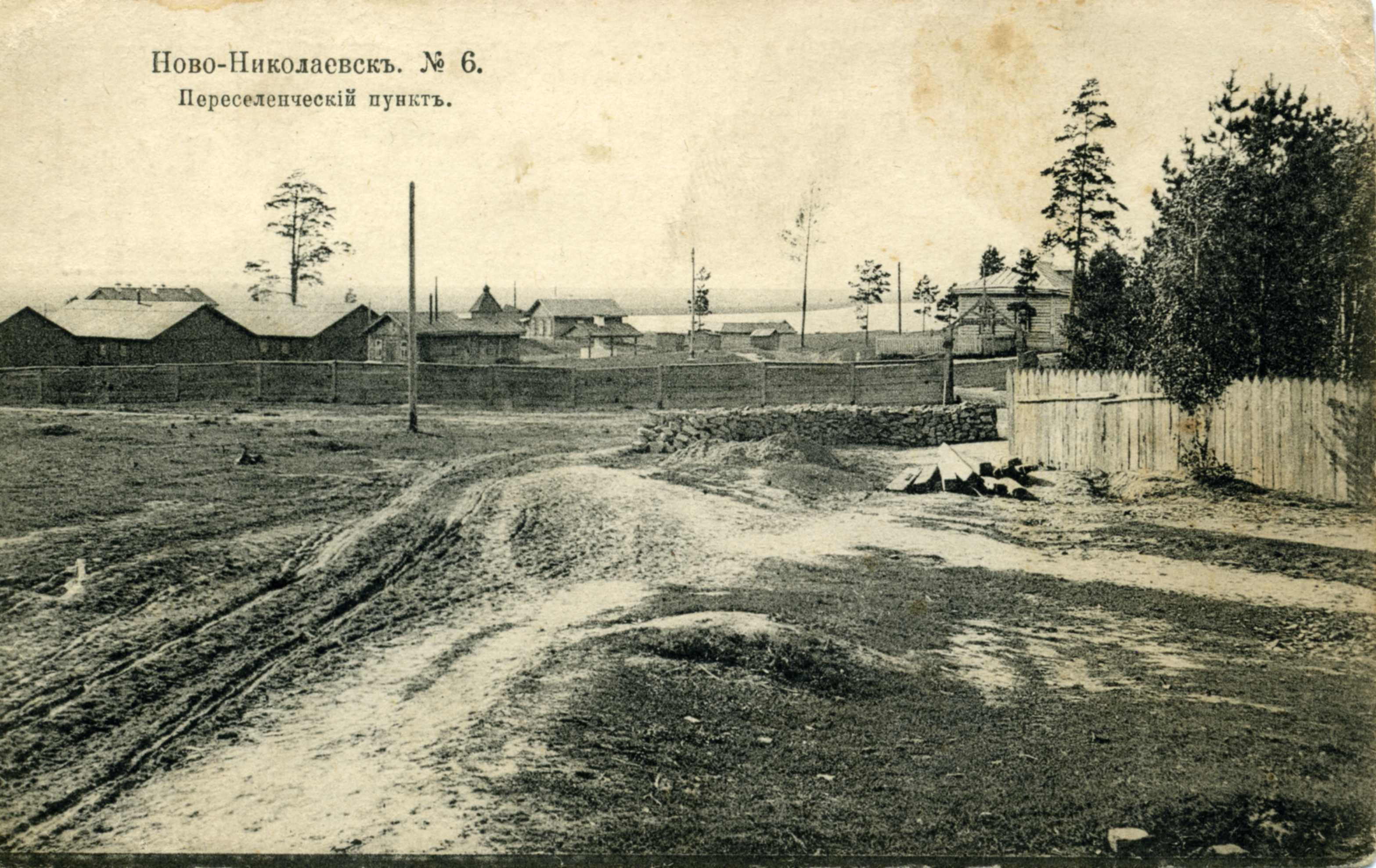
Novonikolayevsk Resettlement Center

Novonikolayevsk Resettlement Center (Russian: Переселенческий пункт, romanized: Pereselencheskiy punkt) is a center for assistance to migrants, opened in 1895. It was located on the territory of modern Zheleznodorozhny City District of Novosibirsk, Russia.

== History ==
The Resettlement Center was built near the railway station in the pine forest. It was fenced and included barracks, a first-aid post, a canteen, a warehouse of agricultural machines, an office of a resettlement official.

From 20 June to 2 August 1900, there was the eye clinic of R. V. Putyata-Kerschbaum, female doctor.

In 1910, Pyotr Stolypin visited the Resettlement Center.

During World War I, the Center accepted refugees.

At present, the territory of the former Resettlement Center is occupied by the Road Clinical Hospital and some streets of the city.

== Bibliography ==
- Маранин И. Ю., Осеев К. А. (2014). Новосибирск: Пять исчезнувших городов. Книга I. Город-вестерн. Новосибирск: Свиньин и сыновья. pp. 140–142. ISBN 978-5-98502-146-2.
- Ламин В. А. (2003). Энциклопедия. Новосибирск. Новосибирск: Новосибирское книжное издательство. pp. 670–671. ISBN 5-7620-0968-8.
