= Novosibirsk Psychiatric Hospital No. 3 =

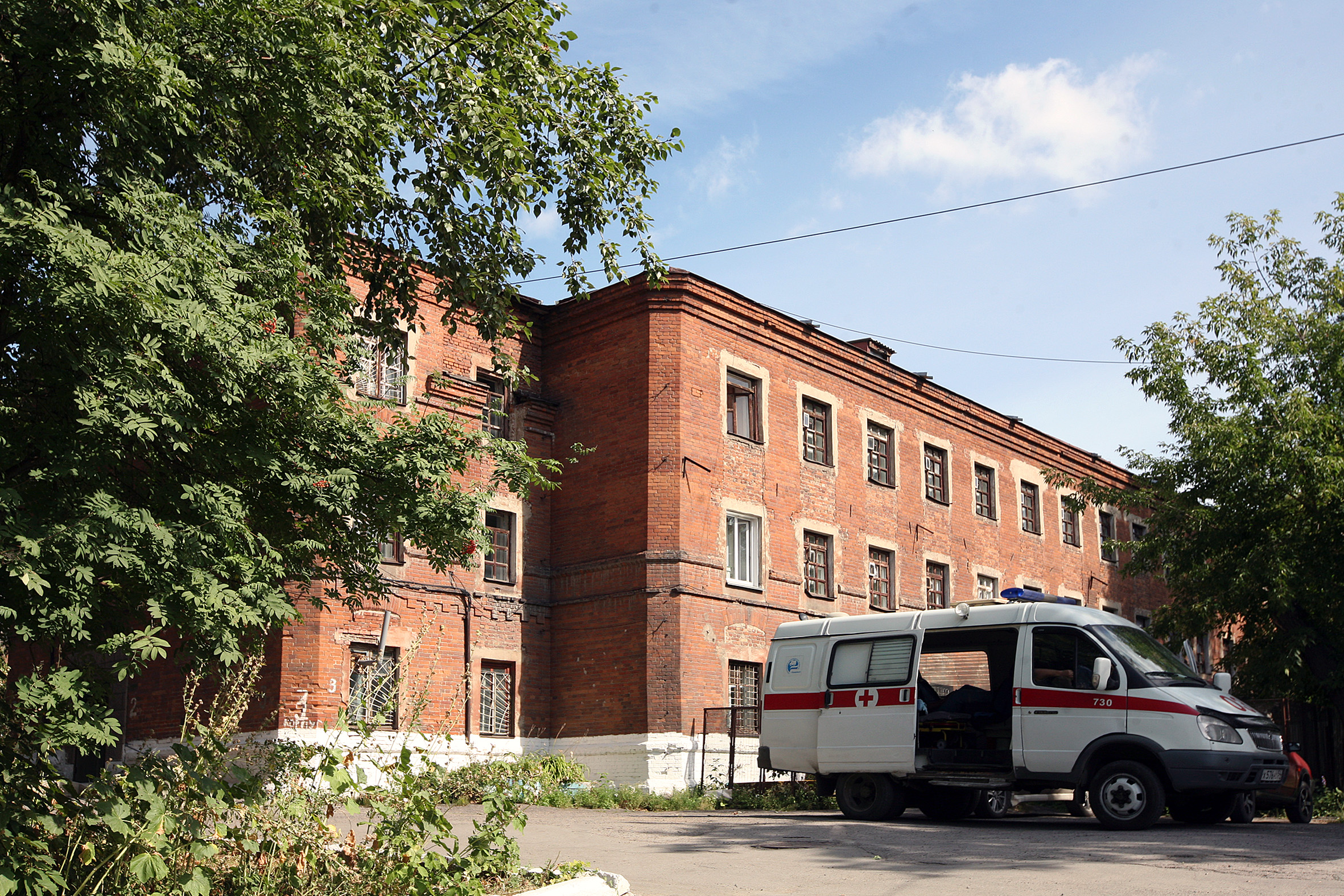

Geography
- Location: Novosibirsk, Russia

Links
- Website: Official website

Novosibirsk Psychiatric Hospital No. 3 (Russian: Новосибирская психиатрическая больница № 3) is a psychiatric hospital located in Novosibirsk, Russia.

== History ==
On June 29, 1929, the West Siberian Neuropsychiatric Dispensary was organized, serving patients of Novosibirsk and the Altai Krai.

In 1951, the dispensary was connected with Psychiatric Hospital No. 3 (Stalin Avenue, 35), and the Department of Mental Illness of the Novosibirsk Medical Institute was created on the basis of the psychiatric organization.

In 1957, the hospital moved to the complex of buildings of the former military camp (Red Barracks), built during the Tsarist period and located on Vladimirovskaya Street (Zheleznodorozhny District of Novosibirsk).

== Departments ==
Three departments of the hospital are located in Novosibirsk, one department is located in the village of Karpysak (Toguchinsky District).

== Head of the hospital ==
- Alla Zinina, head doctor of the psychiatric hospital, candidate of medical sciences.

== Famous patients ==
- Varvara Bulgakova (1895–1956) is the sister of writer Mikhail Bulgakov, prototype for the character of Elena Turbina-Talberg in the novel "The White Guard". She died at the psychiatric hospital in 1956.
