= Macaroni Factory, Novosibirsk =

Building in Novosibirsk, Russia

Macaroni Factory of the Sibirsky Mukomol Partnership
- Макаронная фабрика товарищества «Сибирский мукомол»
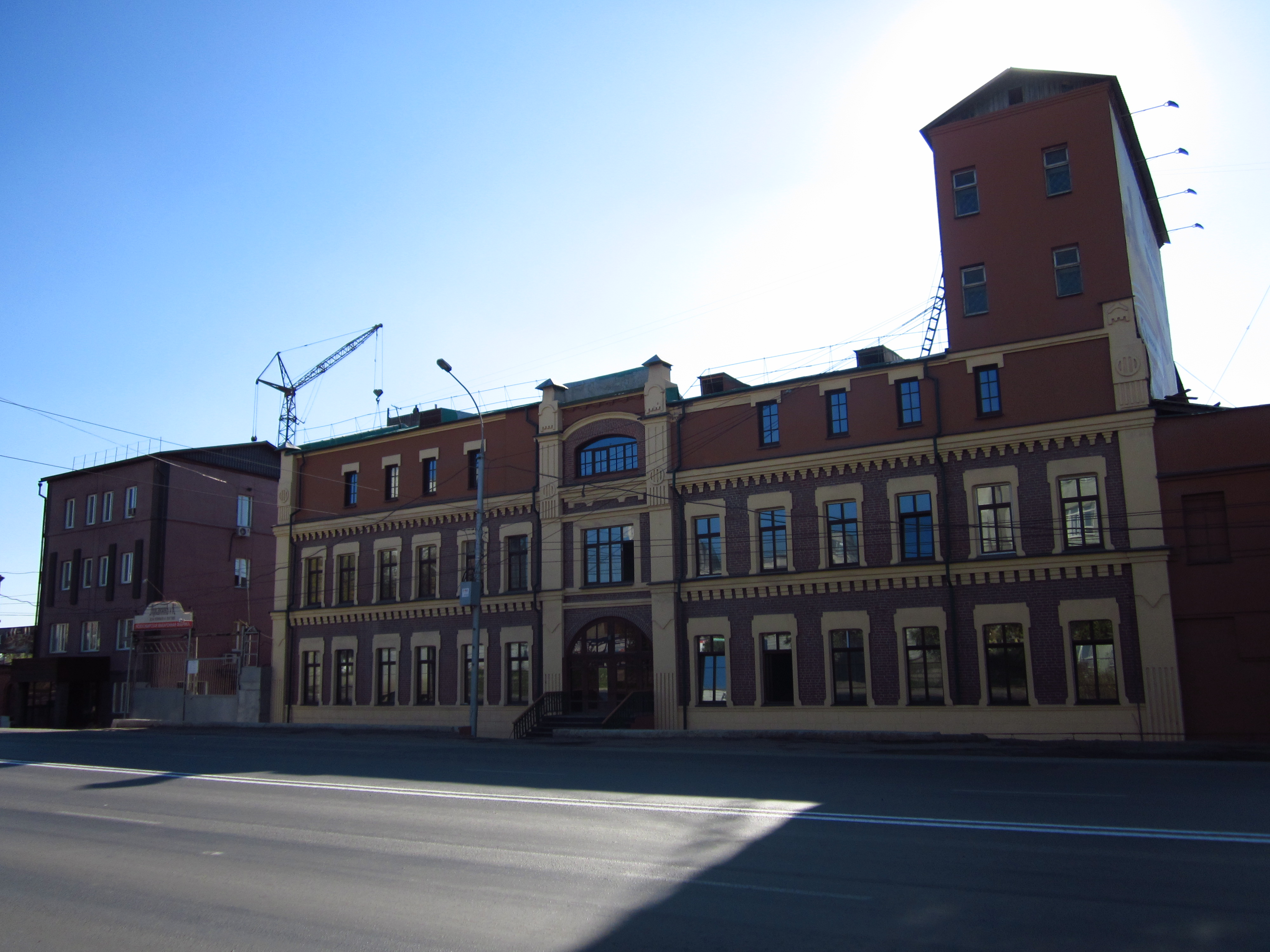
- Interactive map of the Macaroni Factory of the Sibirsky Mukomol Partnership area

General information
- Location: Novosibirsk, Russia
- Coordinates: 55°01′11″N 82°54′42″E
- Completed: 1910

Macaroni Factory of the Sibirsky Mukomol Partnership (Russian: Макаронная фабрика товарищества «Сибирский мукомол») is a building in Zheleznodorozhny City District of Novosibirsk, Russia. It is located at Fabrichnaya Street. The factory was constructed in 1910.

== History ==
The factory was built in 1910 by Sibirsky Mukomol Partnership. Soon, the production of the factory was awarded at the exhibitions in Paris, Rome and the Baltic Exhibition of the Society of Agriculture.

The building is now occupied by Novosibirsk Macaroni Factory.
