= Zheleznodorozhny District, Novosibirsk =

Zheleznodorozhny District
- District
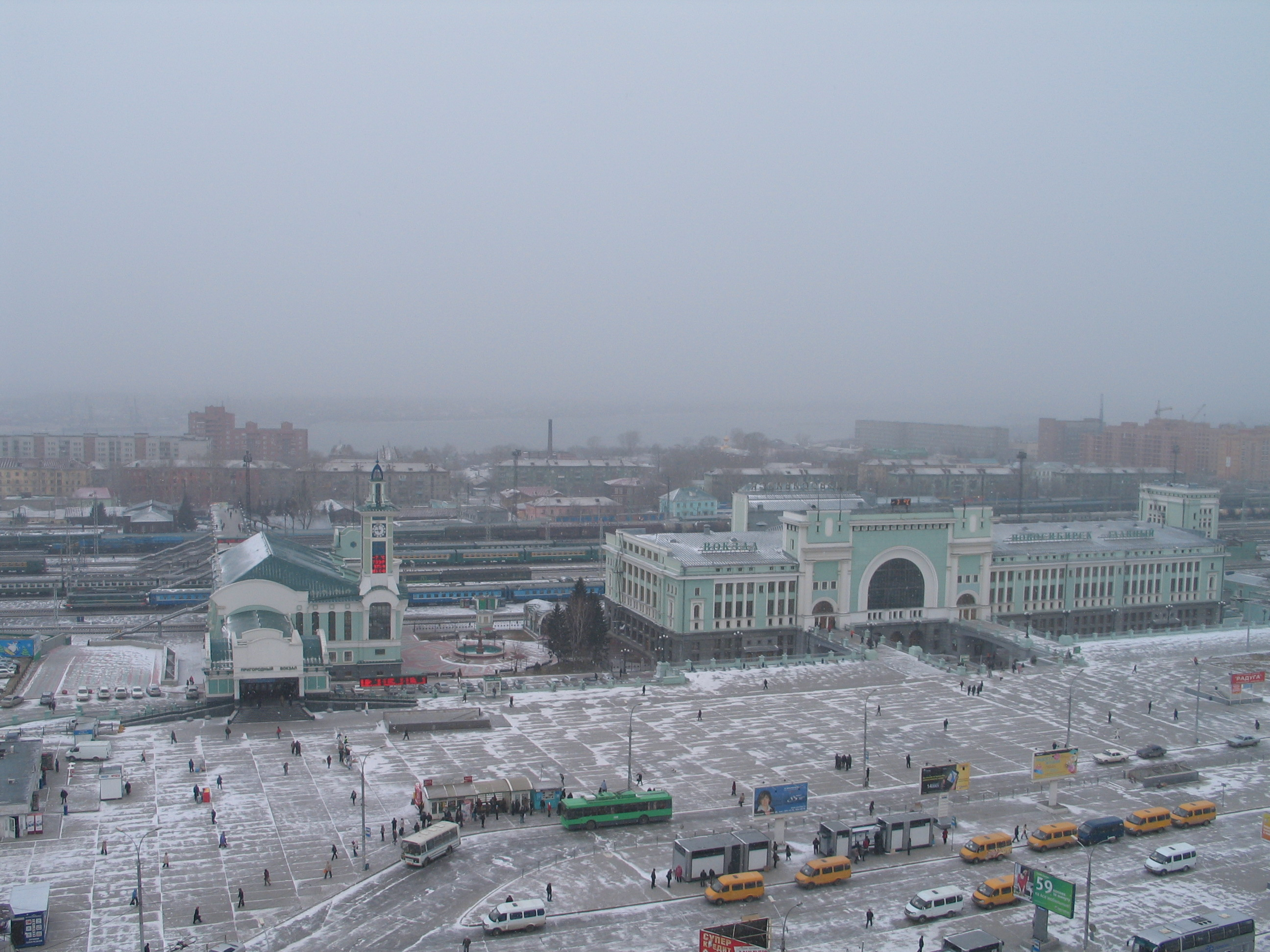
- Location of Zheleznodorozhny City District
- Coordinates: 55°1′59.99″N 82°55′0.01″E
- Country: Russia
- Federal subject: Novosibirsk

Area
  - Total: 8.3 km^{2} (3.2 sq mi)

Zheleznodorozhny District (Russian: Железнодорожный район) is an administrative district (raion) of Central Okrug, one of the 10 raions of Novosibirsk, Russia. The area of the district is 8.3 km^{2} (2.5 sq mi). Population: 64 972 (2017).

== History ==
The first houses were built here in 1893. At first, the district was named Vokzalnaya Chast.

In 1895 the Resettlement Center was established.

Kaganovichesky District was formed in 1936.

Novosibirsk Glavny Railway Station built in 1939.

In 1957 the Kaganovichesky District was renamed the Zheleznodorozhny District.

== Streets ==
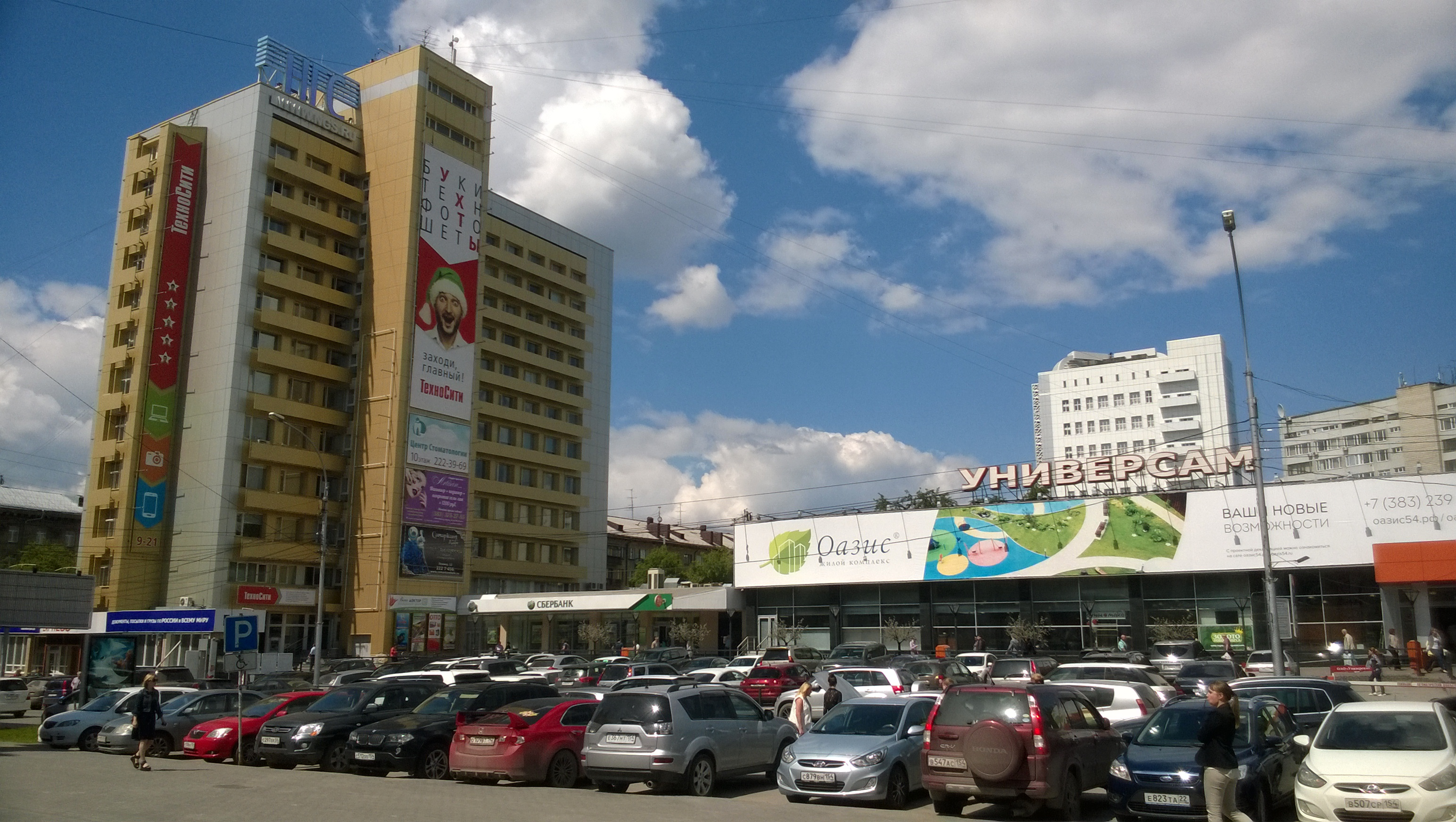
Lenin Street

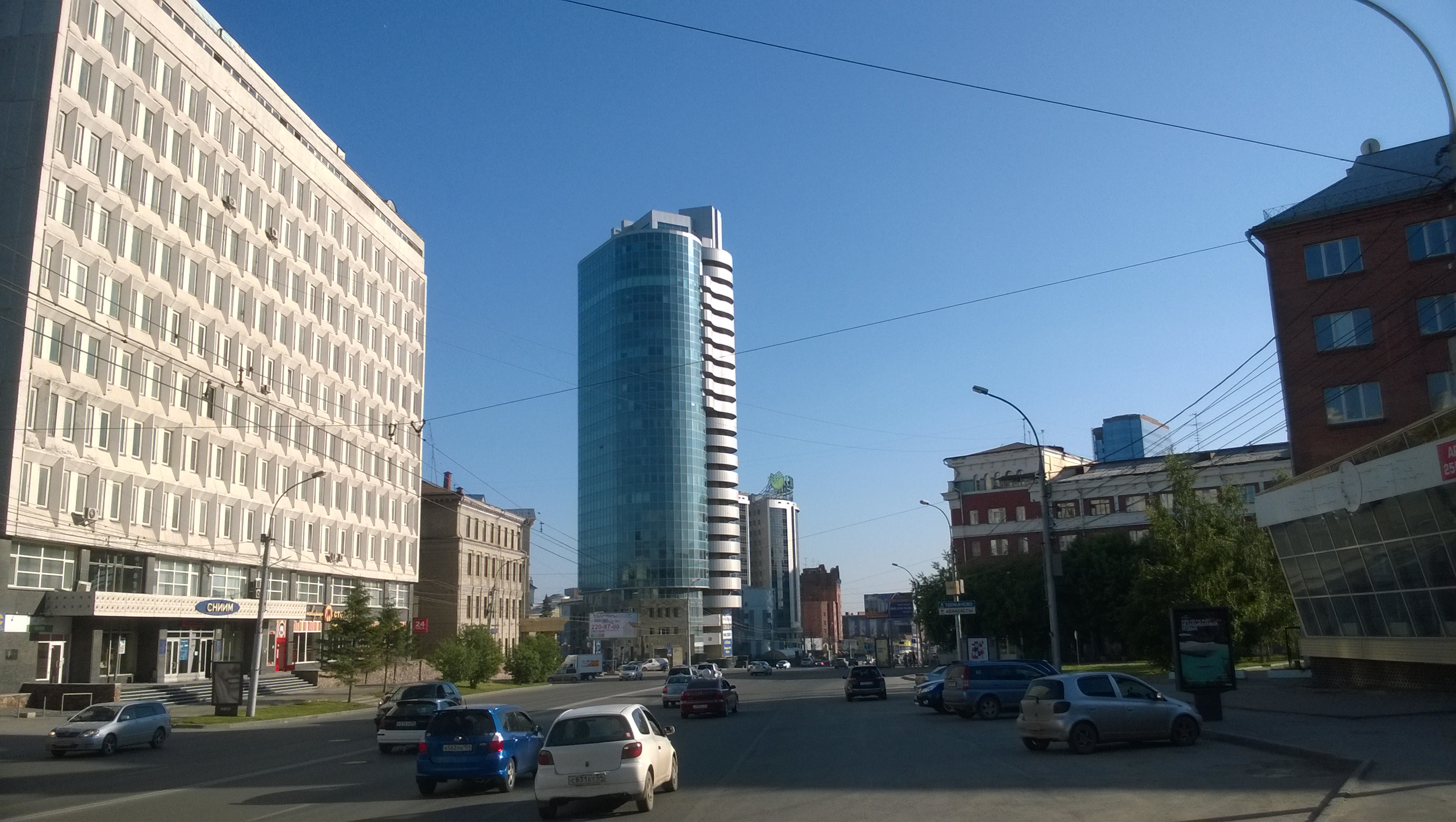
Dimitrov Prospekt

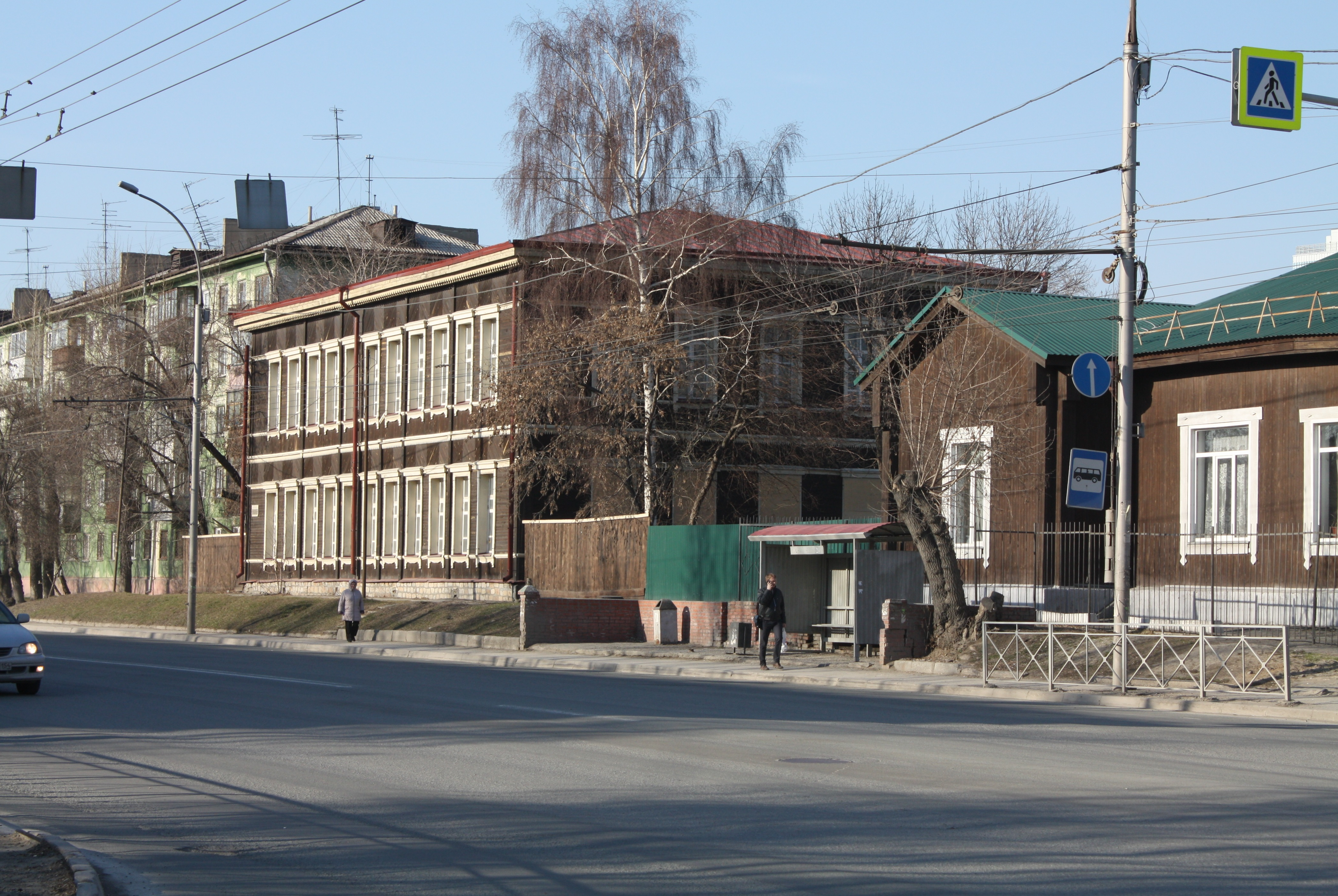
Vladimirovskaya Street

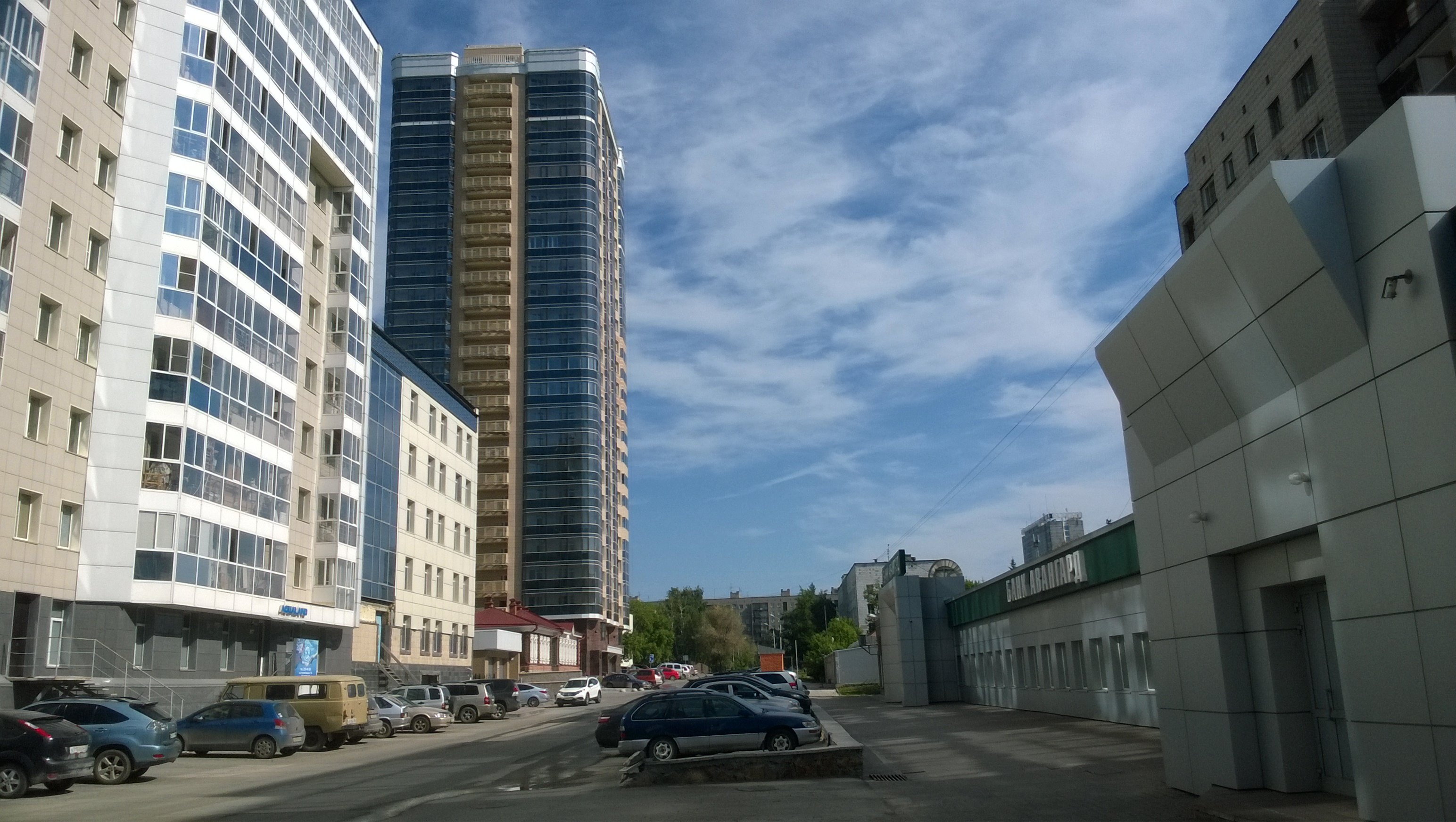
Saltykov-Shchedrin Street

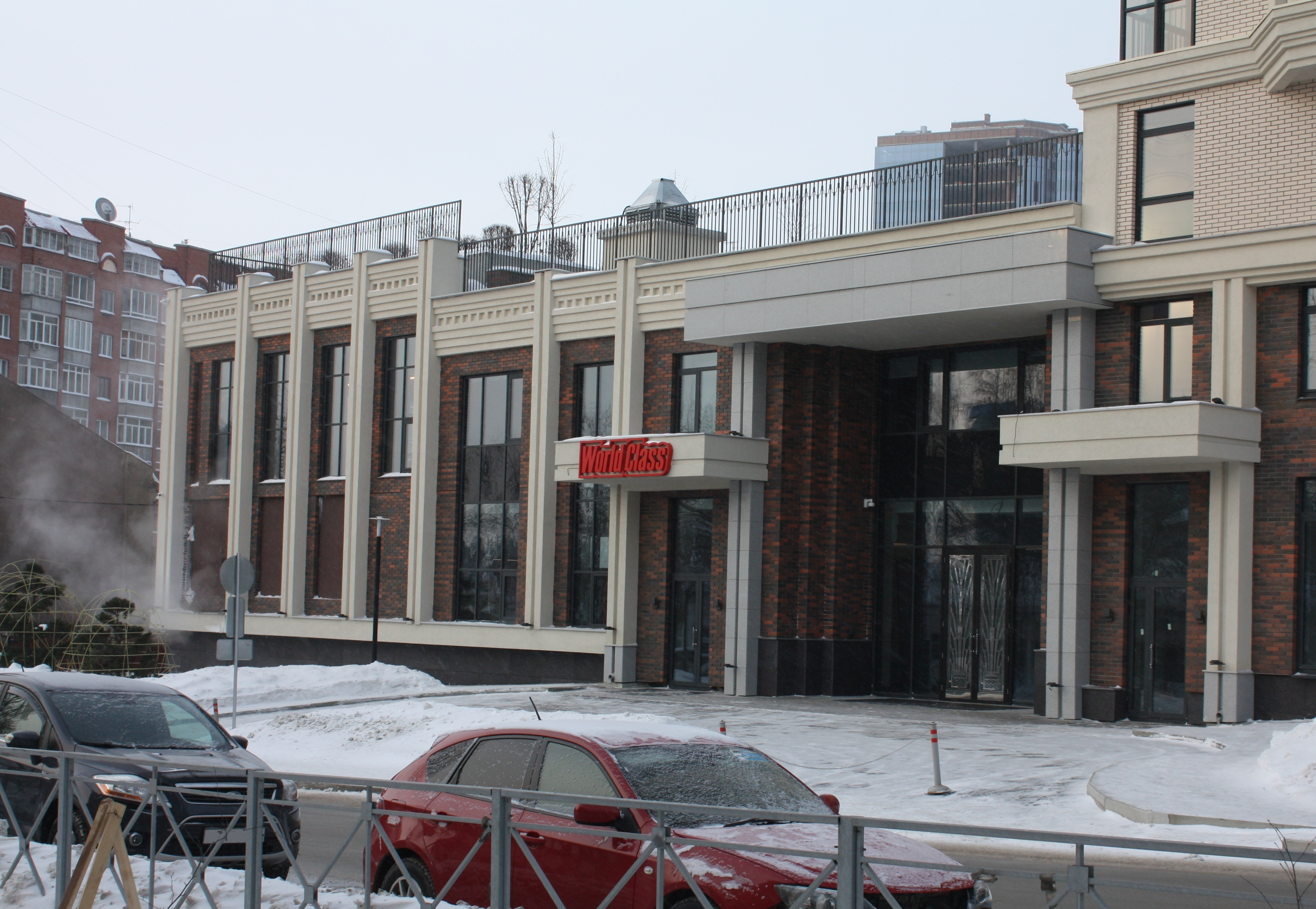
Gorky Street

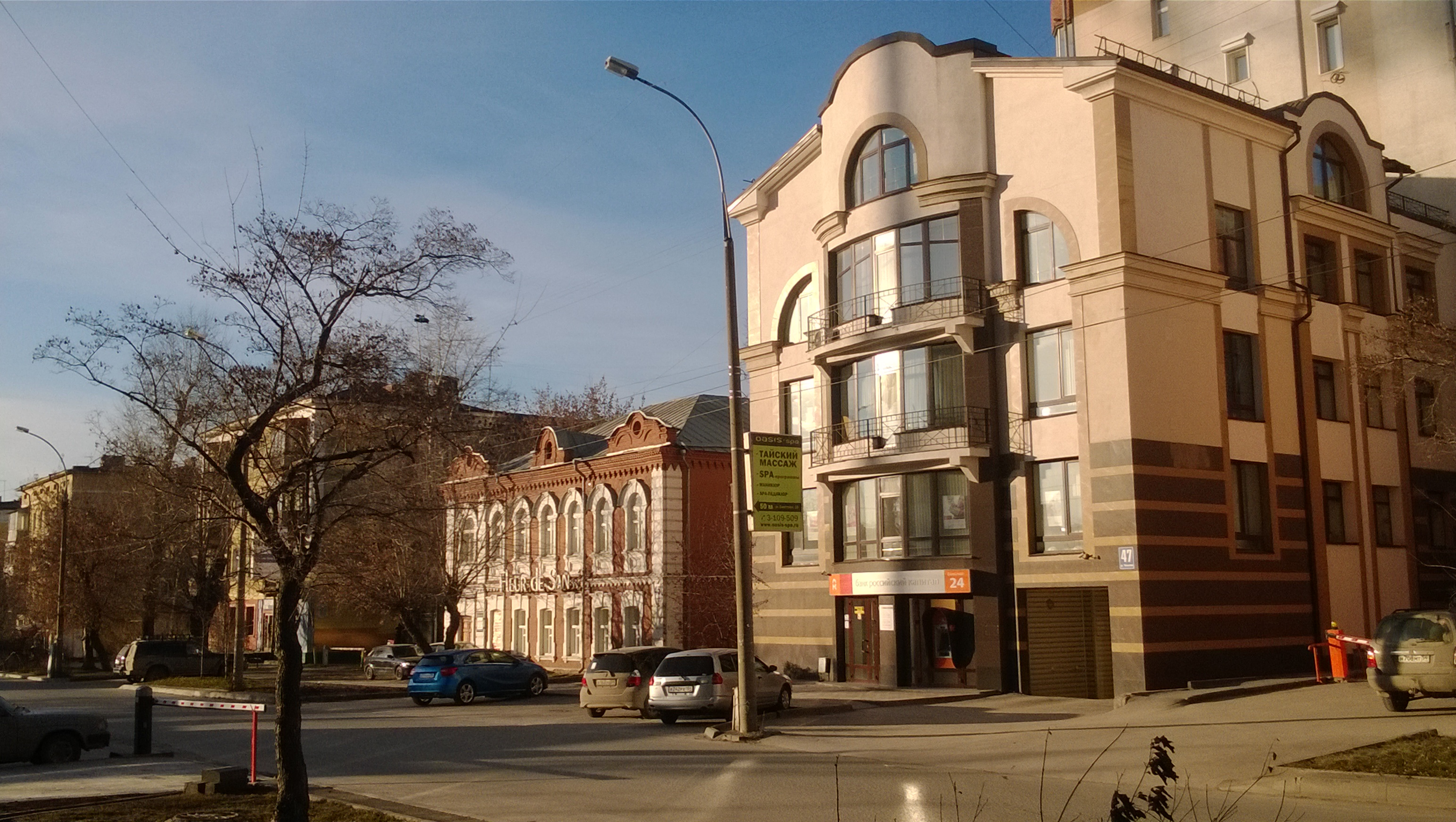
Chaplygin Street

== Architecture ==
=== Tsarist period ===
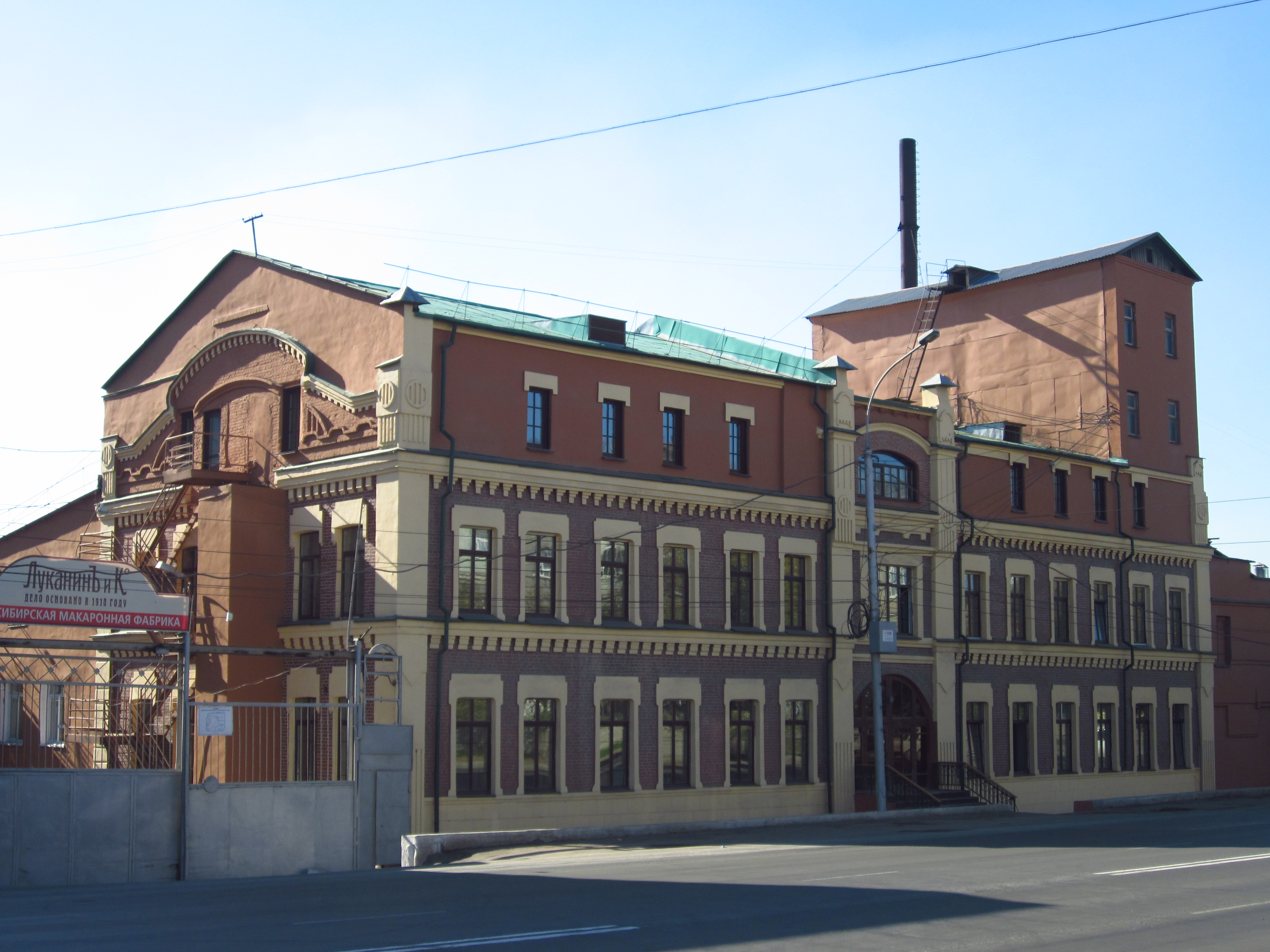
Macaroni factory, 1910

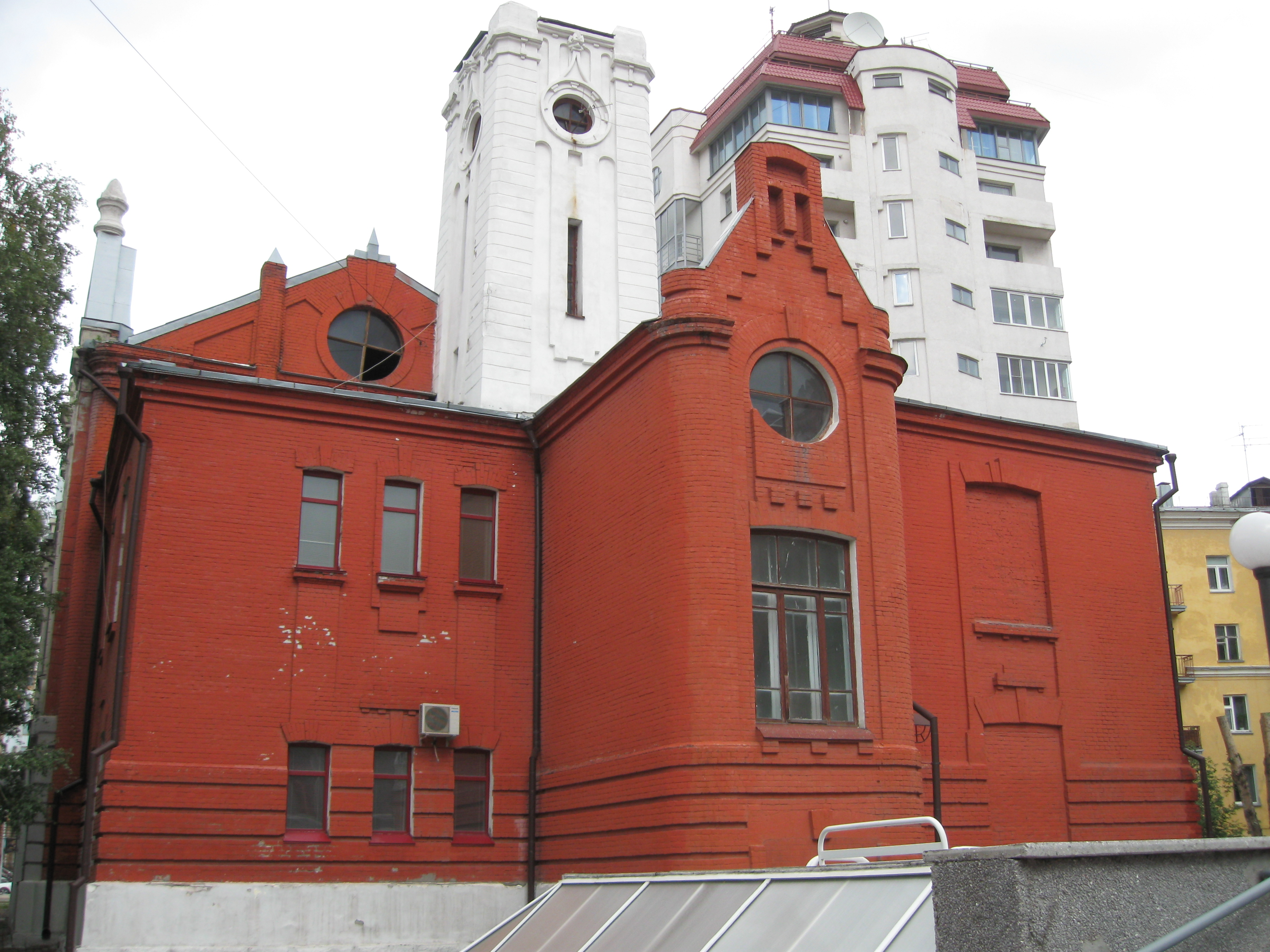
Andreyevskaya School, 1912

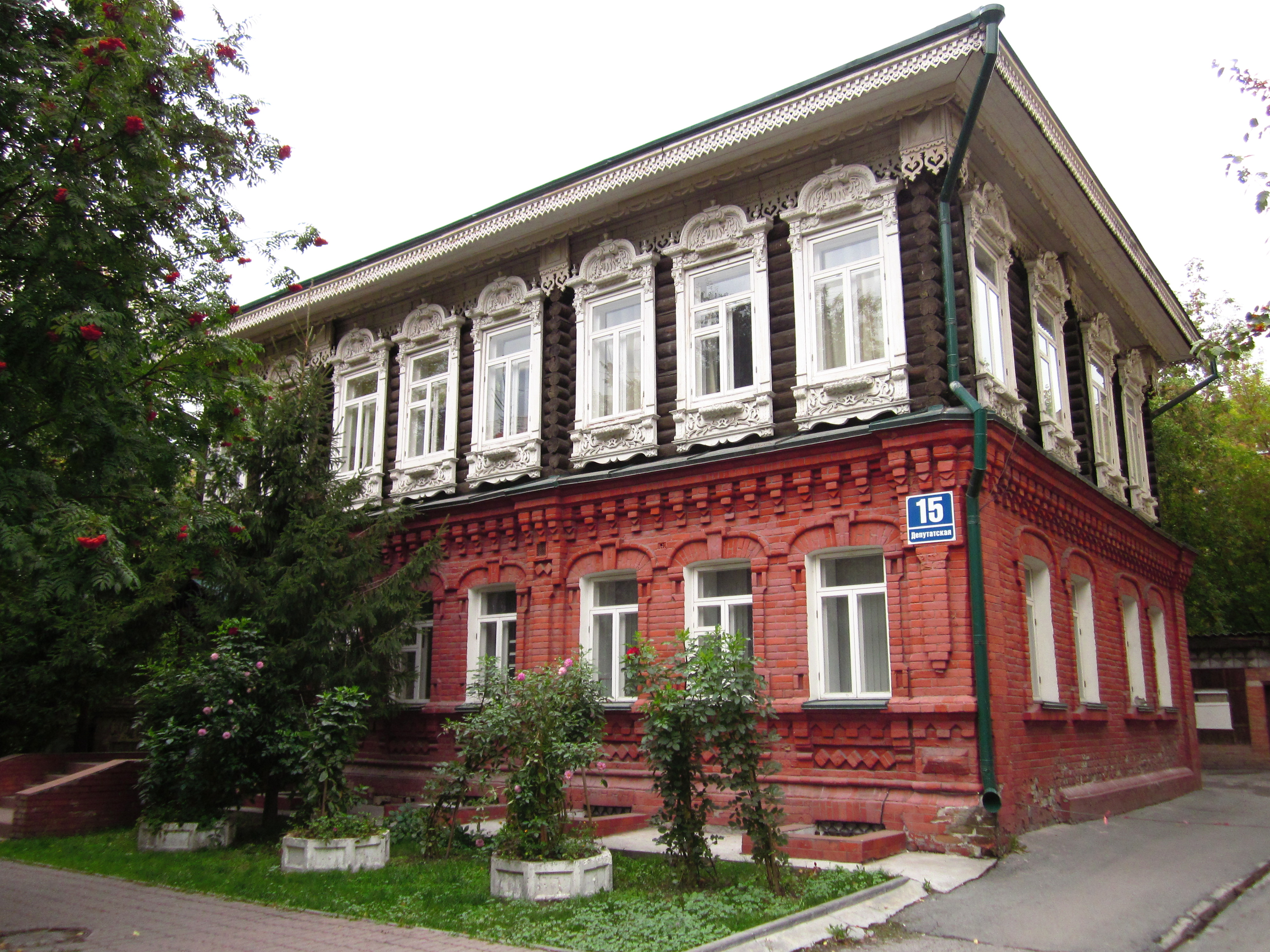
Istomin House, 1905

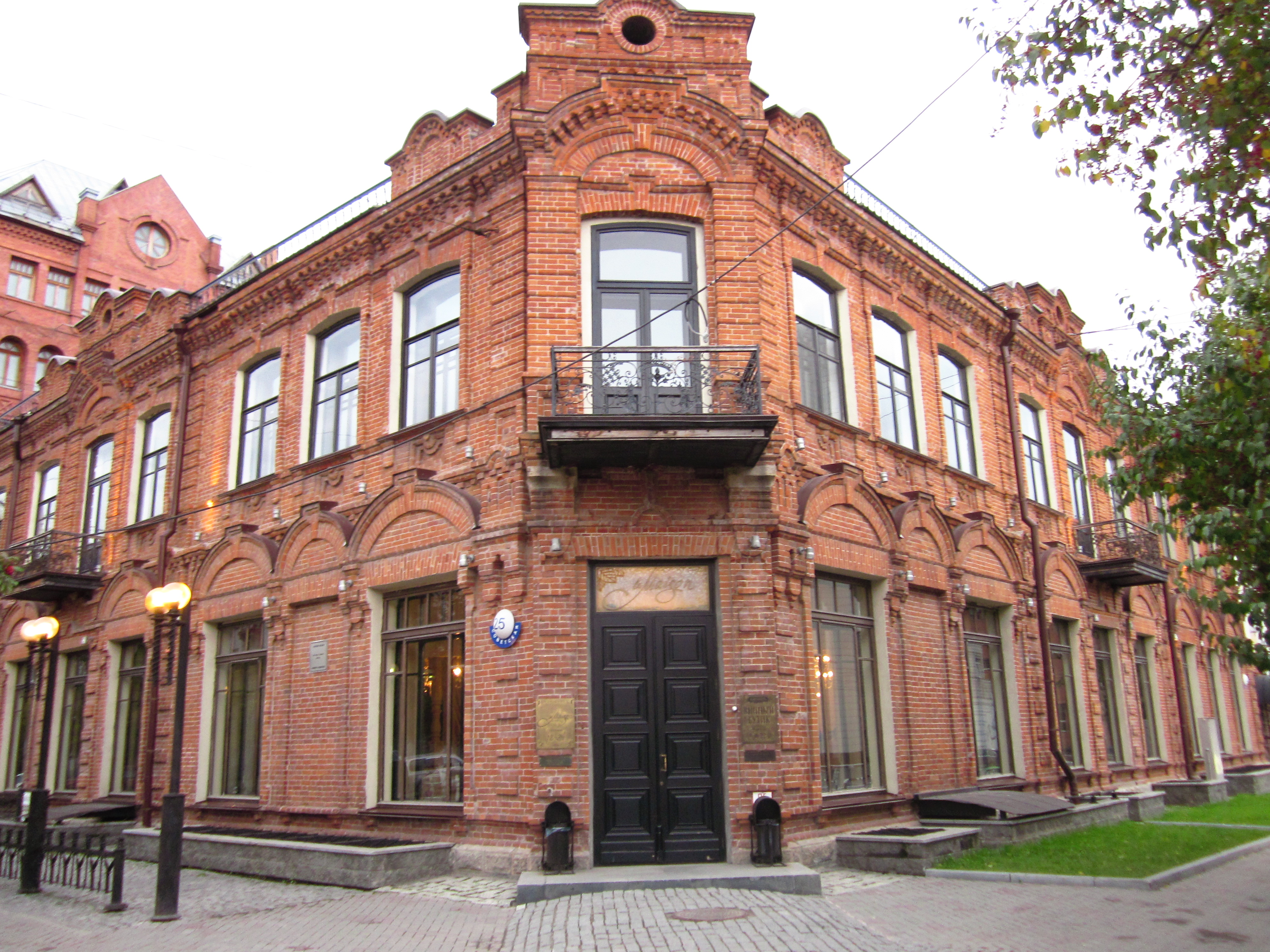
Kryukov House, 1908

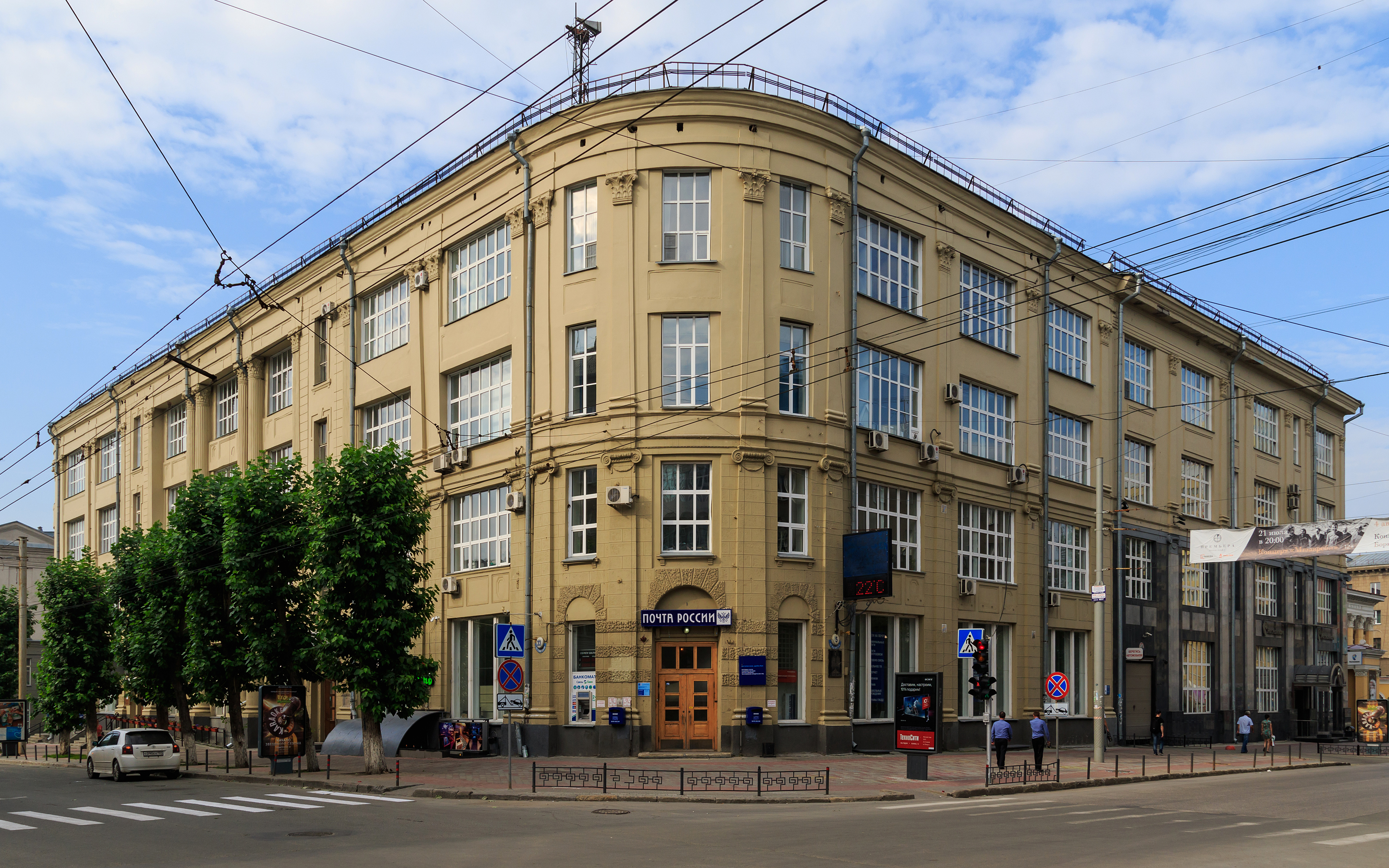
Main Post Office, 1916

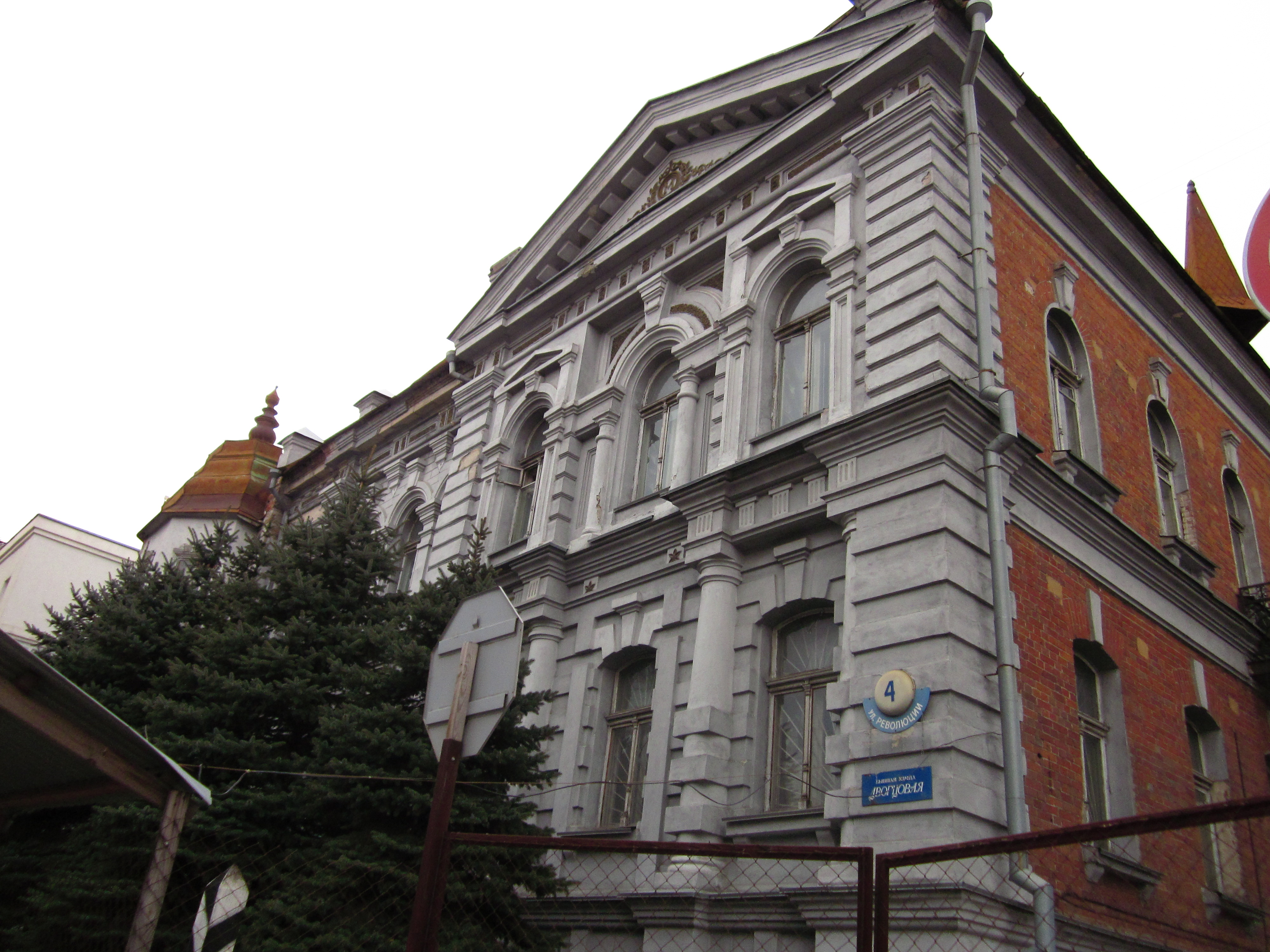
Metropoliten Hotel, 1905

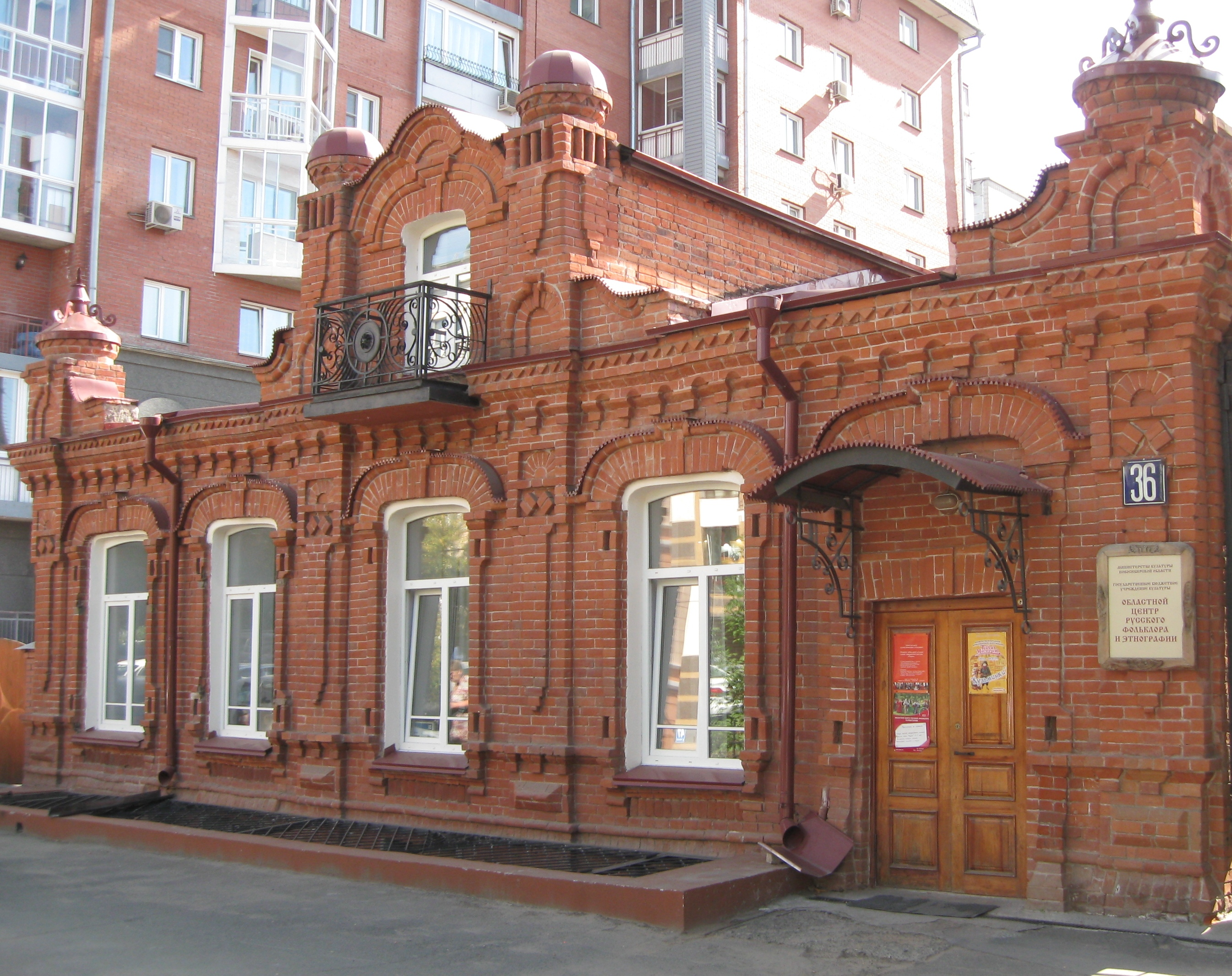
Ikonnikova House, 1900s

=== Soviet period ===
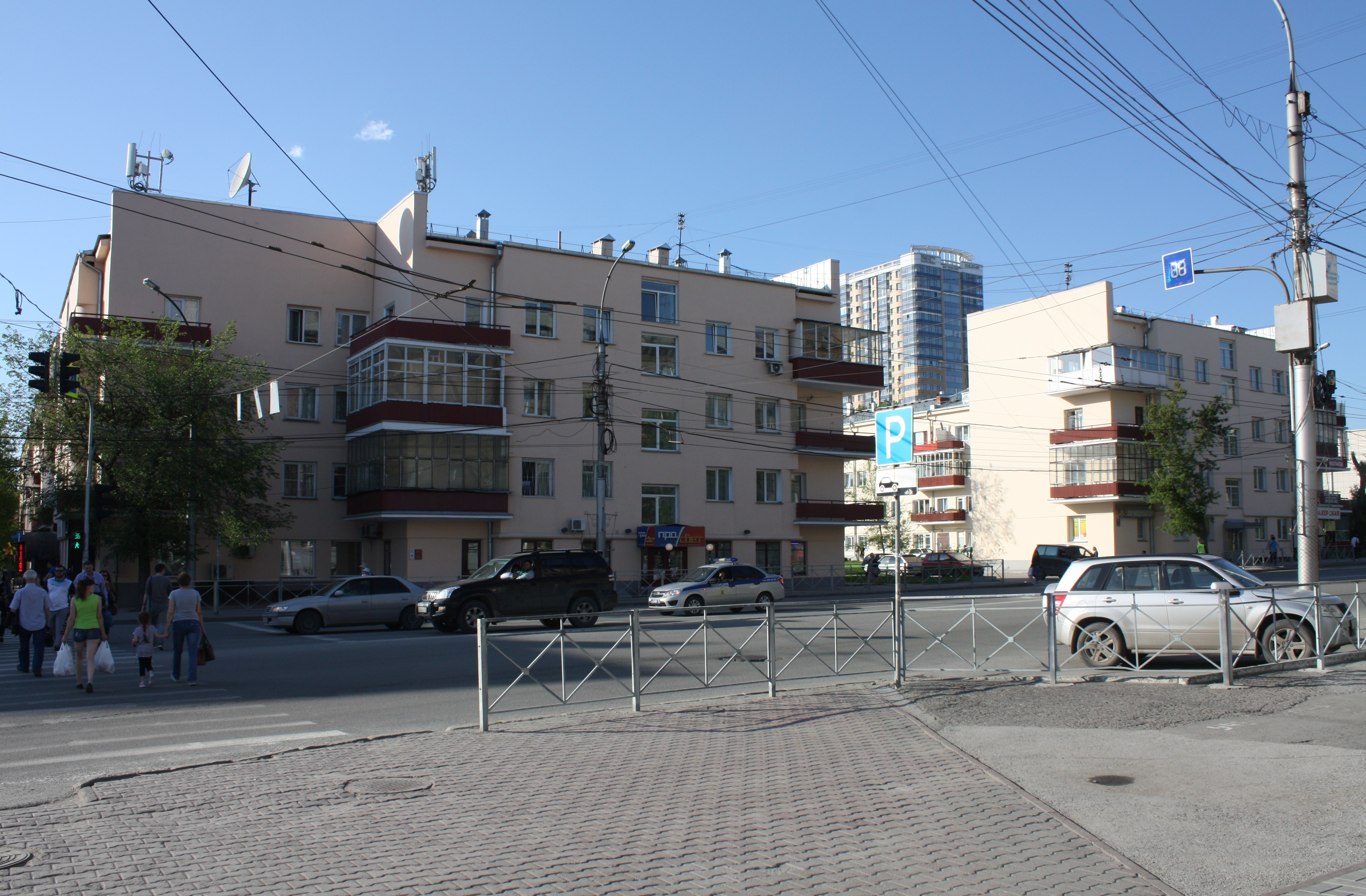
Housing estate near Novosibirsk-Glavny Railway Station, 1928–1933

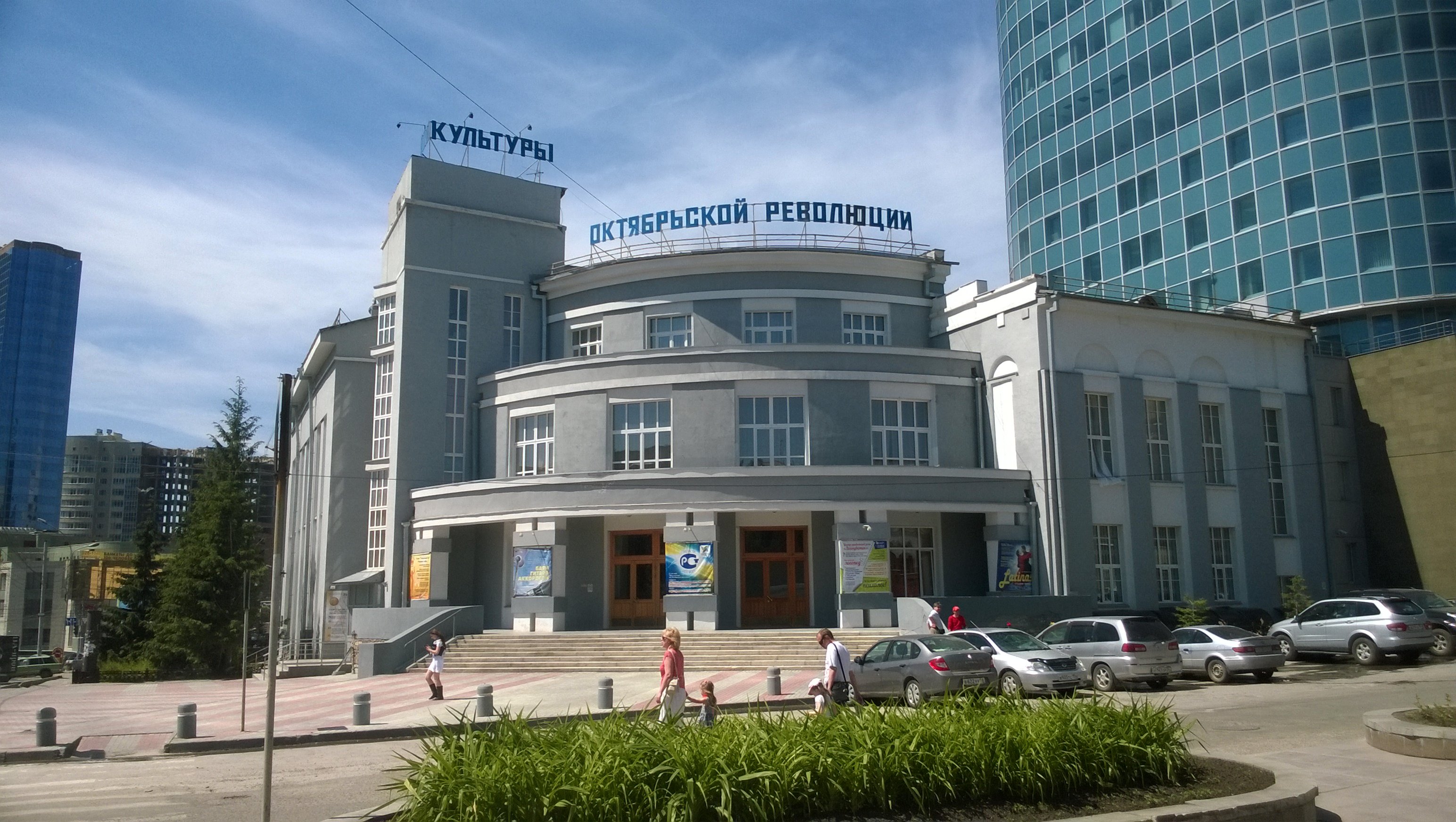
October Revolution House of Culture, 1928

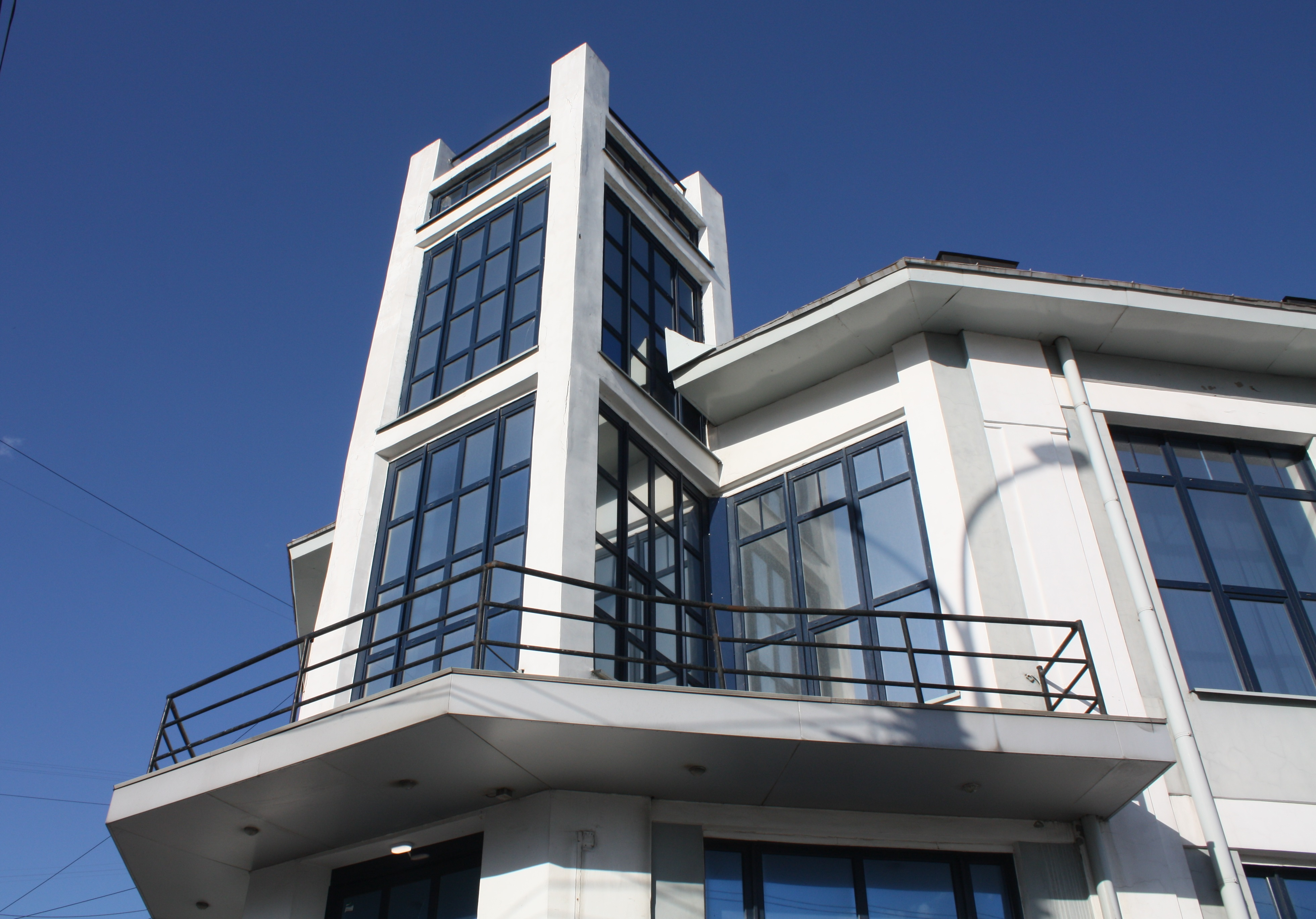
Univermag, 1927

=== Post-Soviet period ===
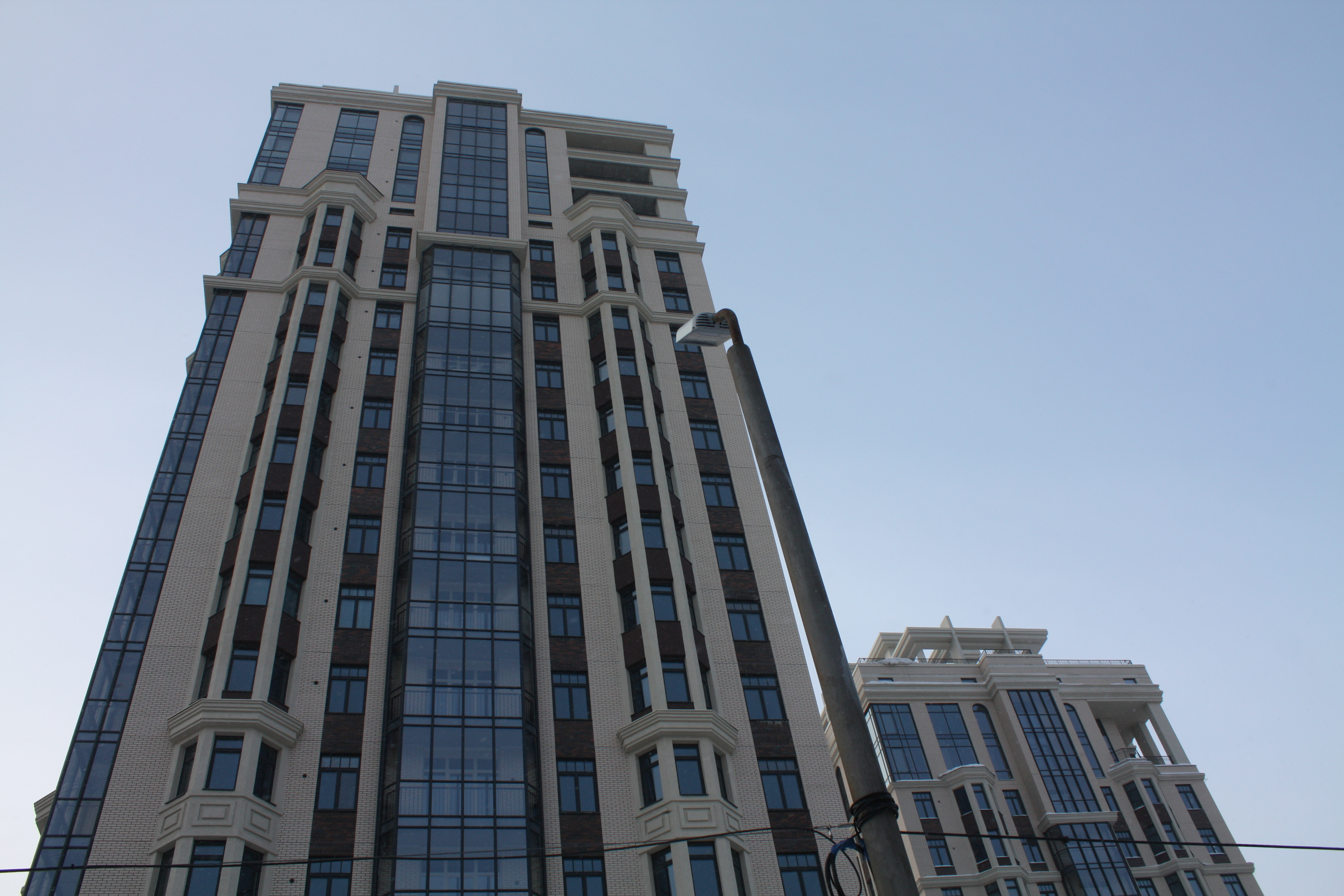

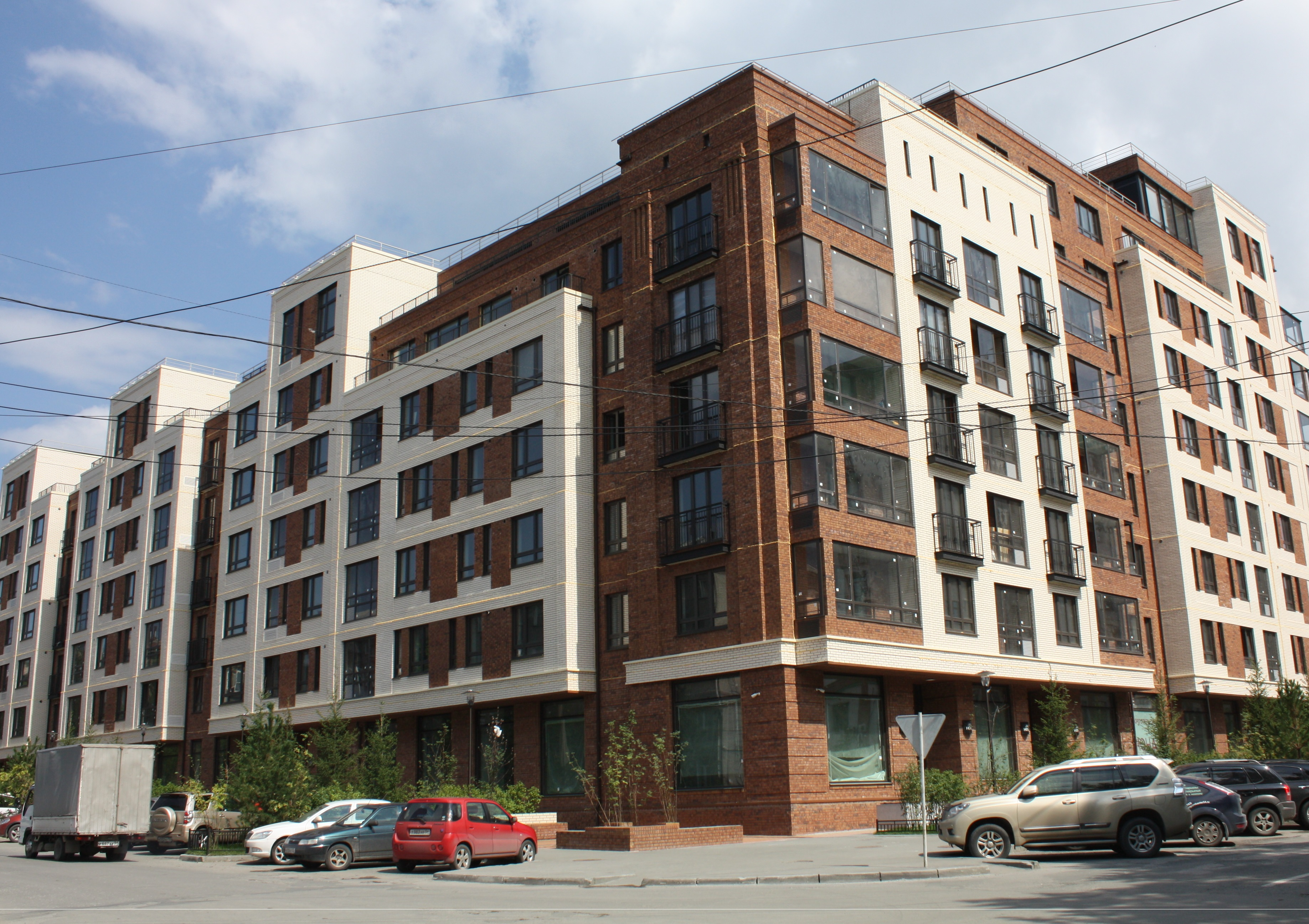

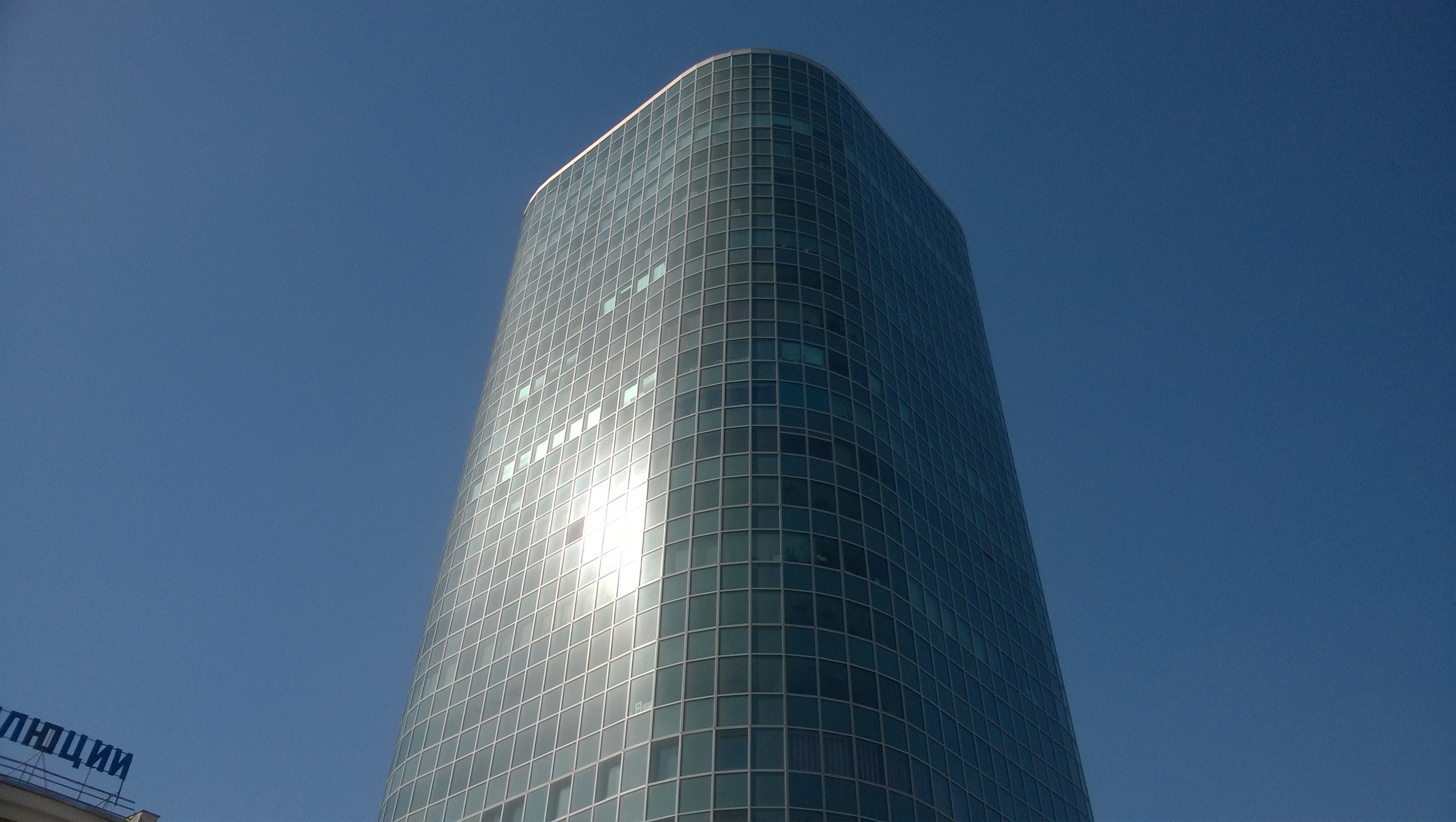

== Science and education ==
- Siberian Scientific Research Institute of Metrology
- Novosibirsk Medical College
- Novosibirsk Cooperative Technical School named after A. N. Kosygin
- Novosibirsk Special Music School
- Novosibirsk State Conservatoire named after M.I. Glinka
- Novosibirsk State Academy of Water Transportation Engineering
- Novosibirsk State Theater Institute

== Medicine ==
- Novosibirsk Psychiatric Hospital No. 3

== Religion ==
=== Christianity ===
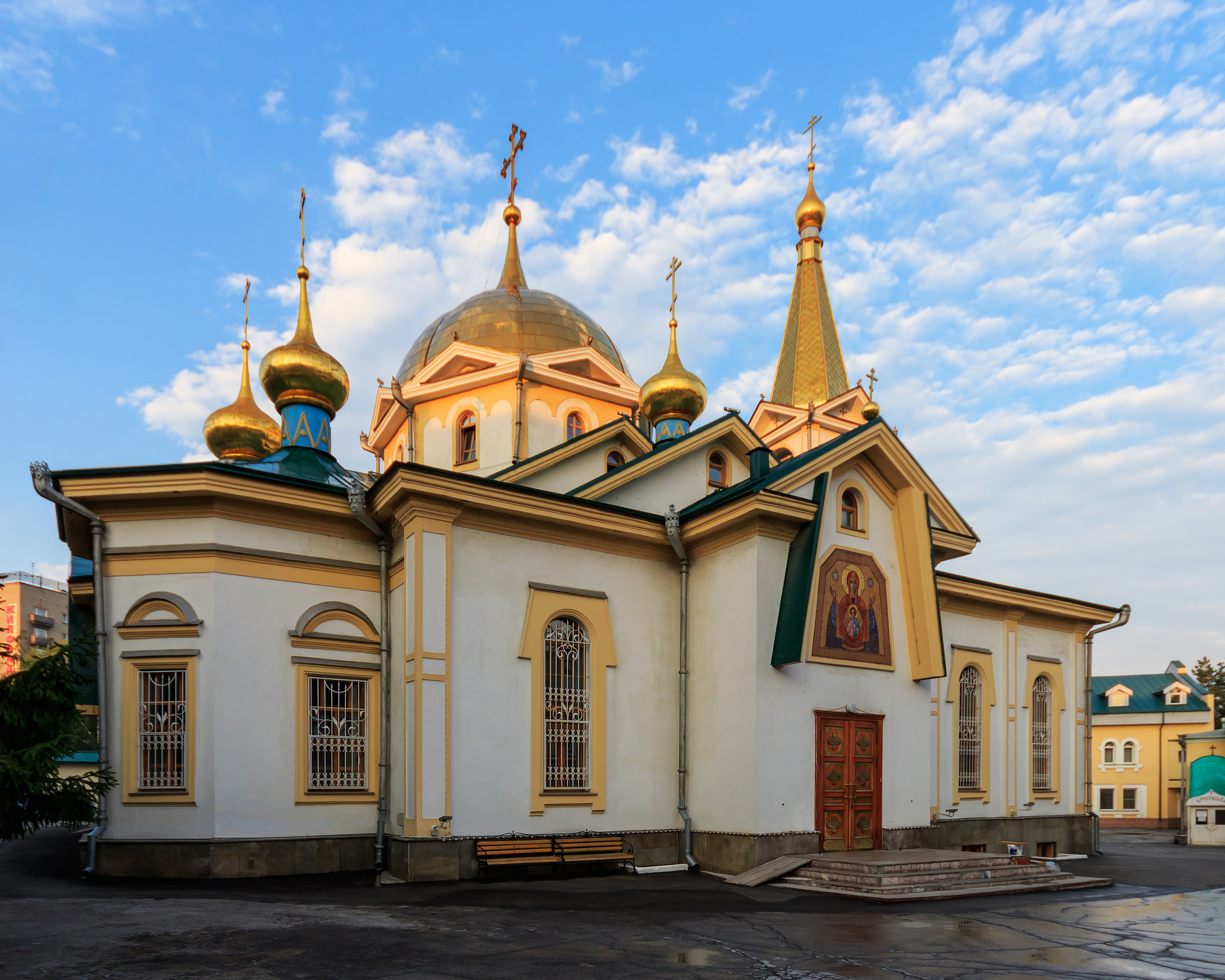
Orthodox cathedral of the Ascension of Christ

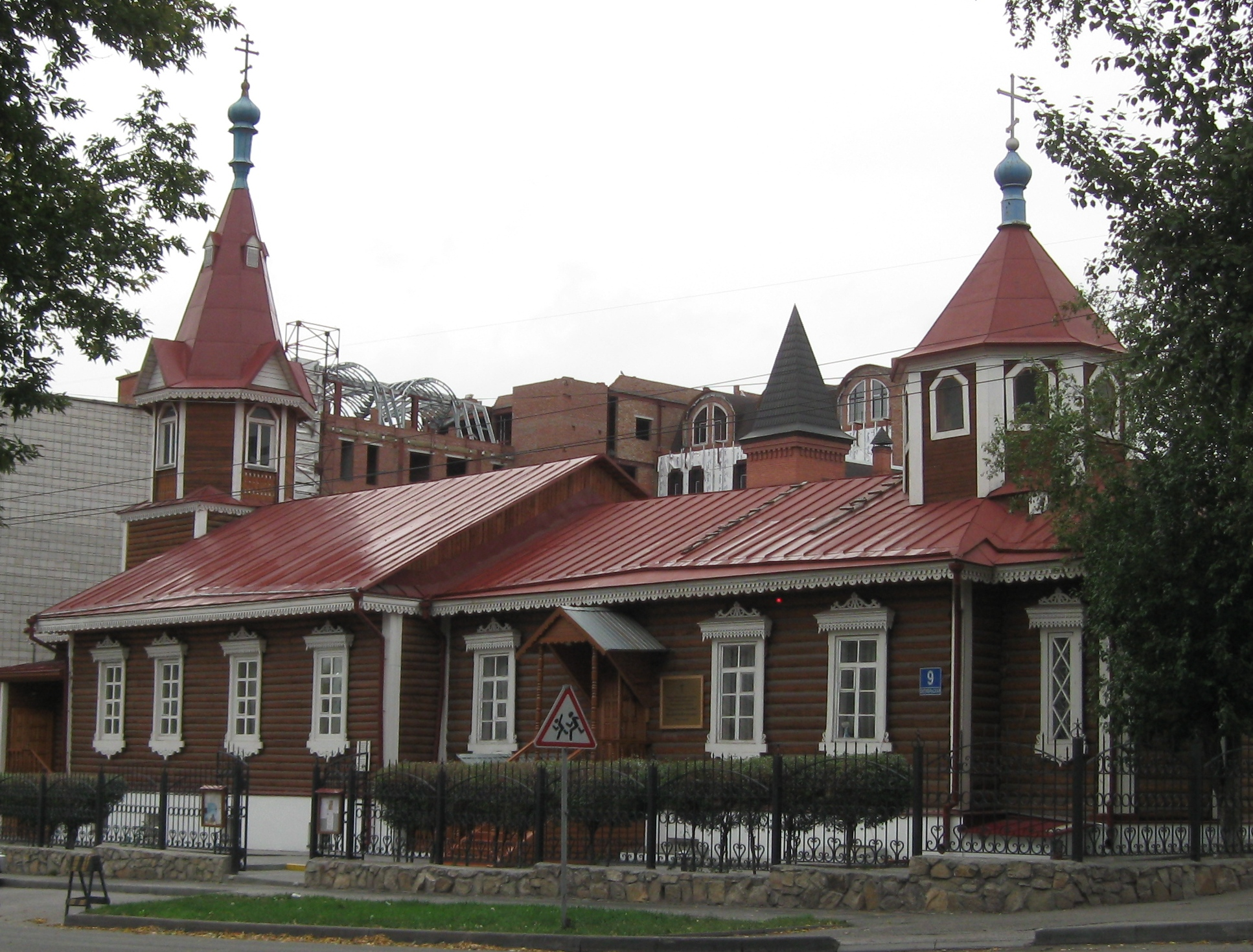
Church of the Protection of the Theotokos

== Economy ==
=== Industry ===
- Noema is a sound equipment company.

=== Tourism ===
==== Hotels ====
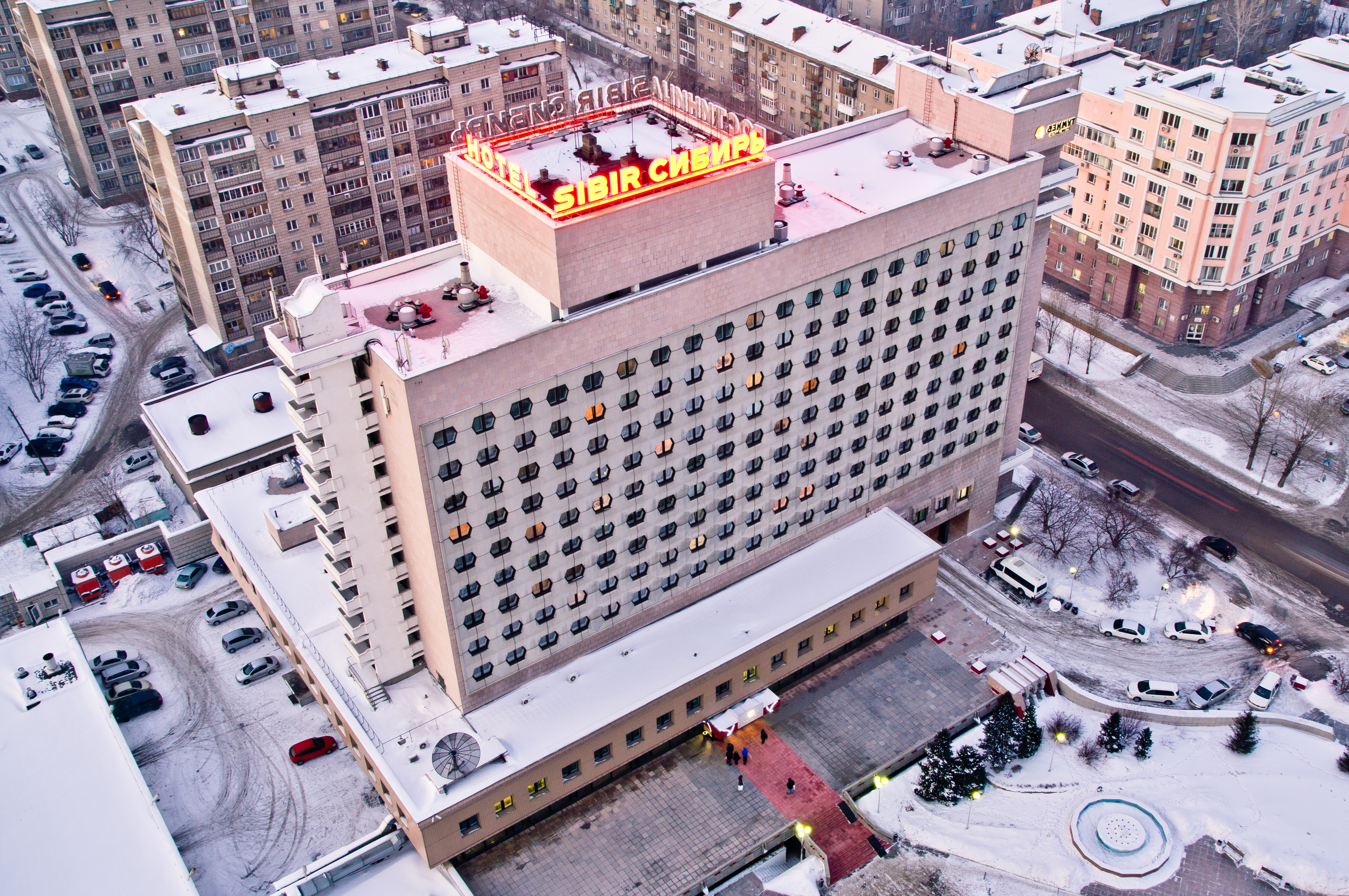
Azimut Hotel Siberia

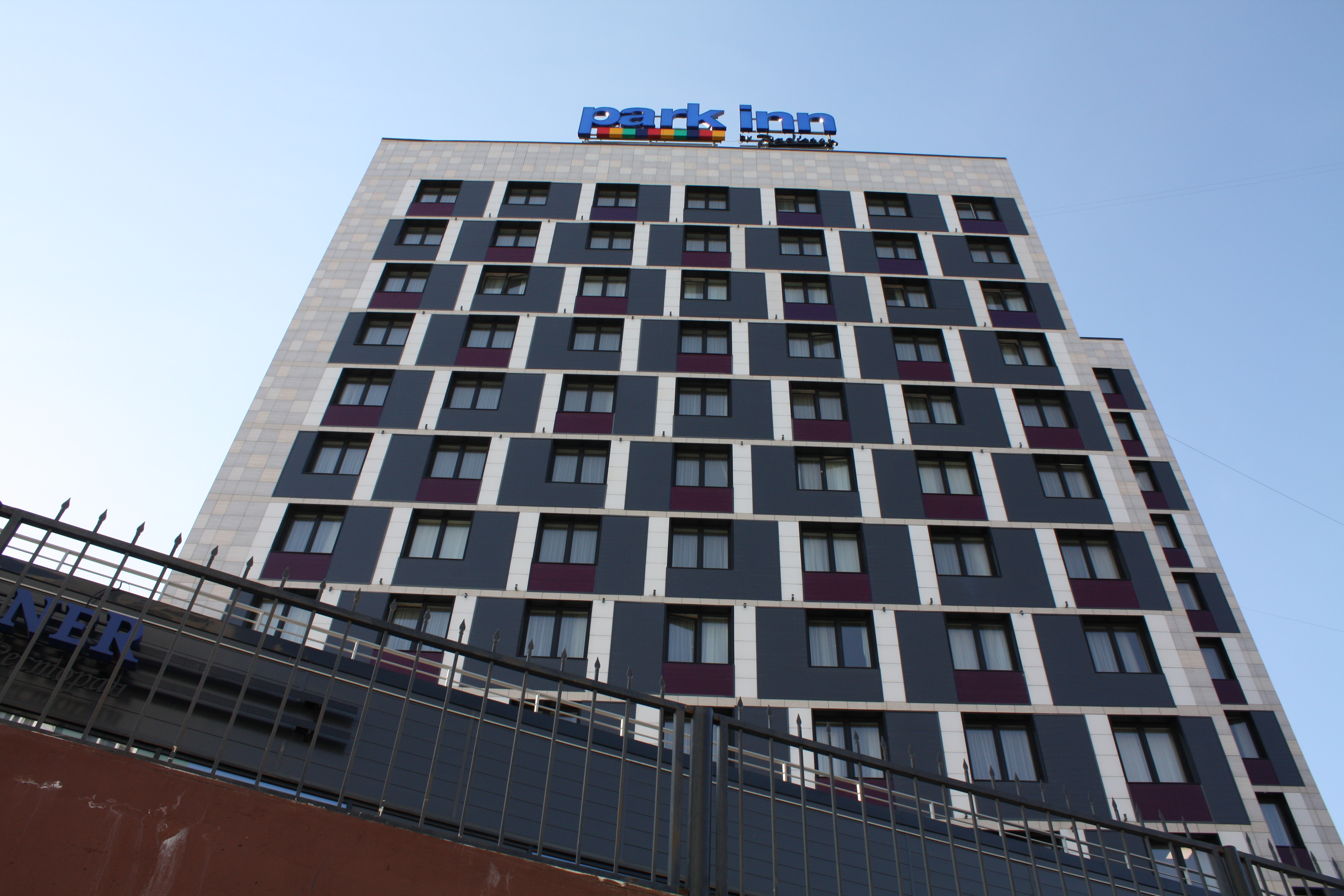
Park Inn by Radisson Novosibirsk

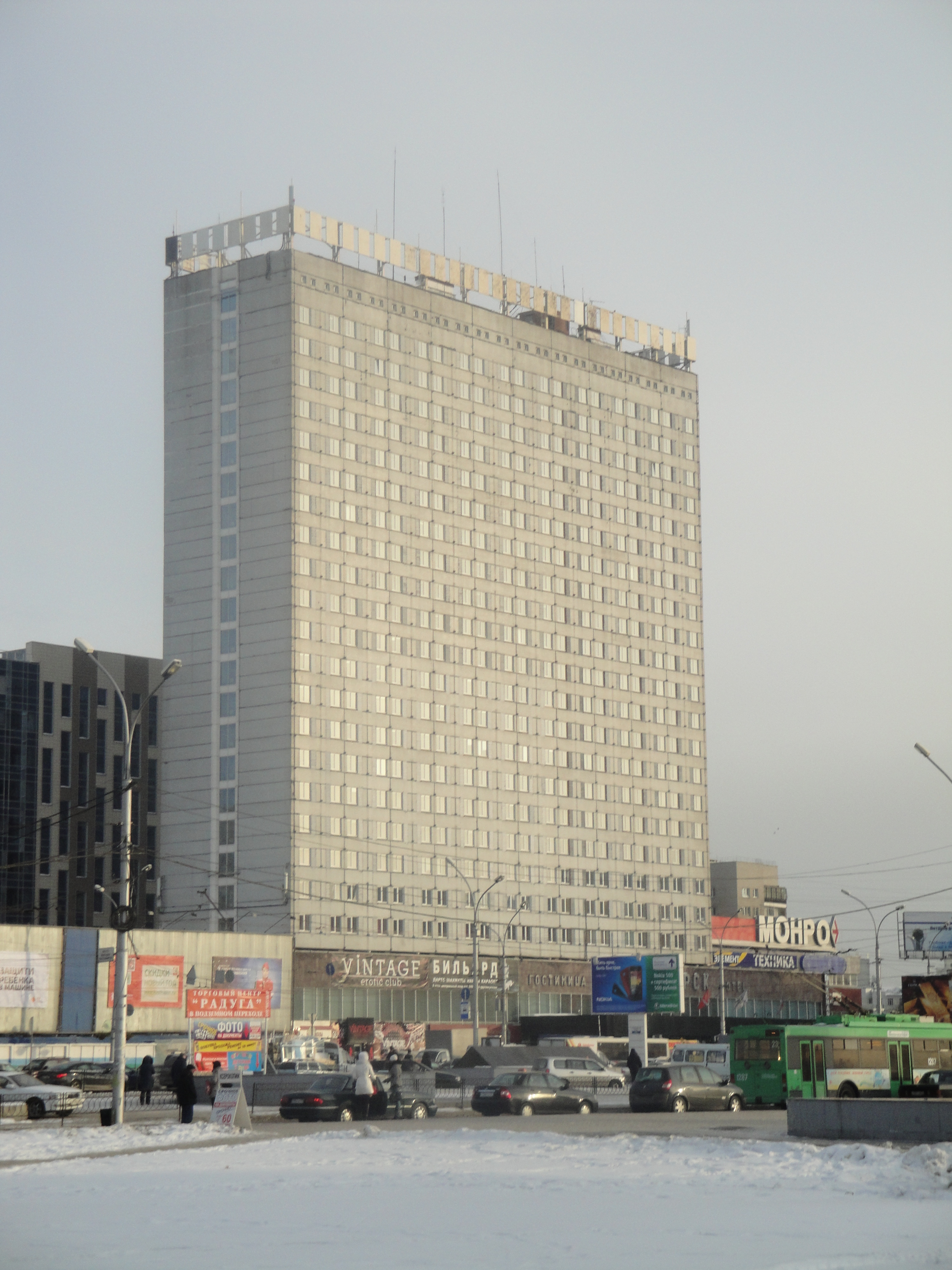
Novosibirsk Hotel

==== Museums ====
- Nicholas Roerich Museum
- Museum of communication

==== Theatres ====
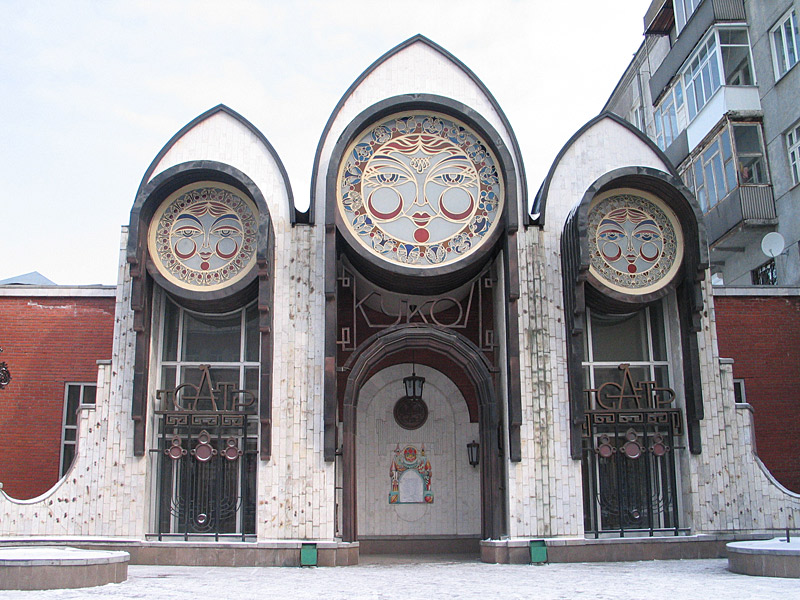
Novosibirsk Puppet Theatre

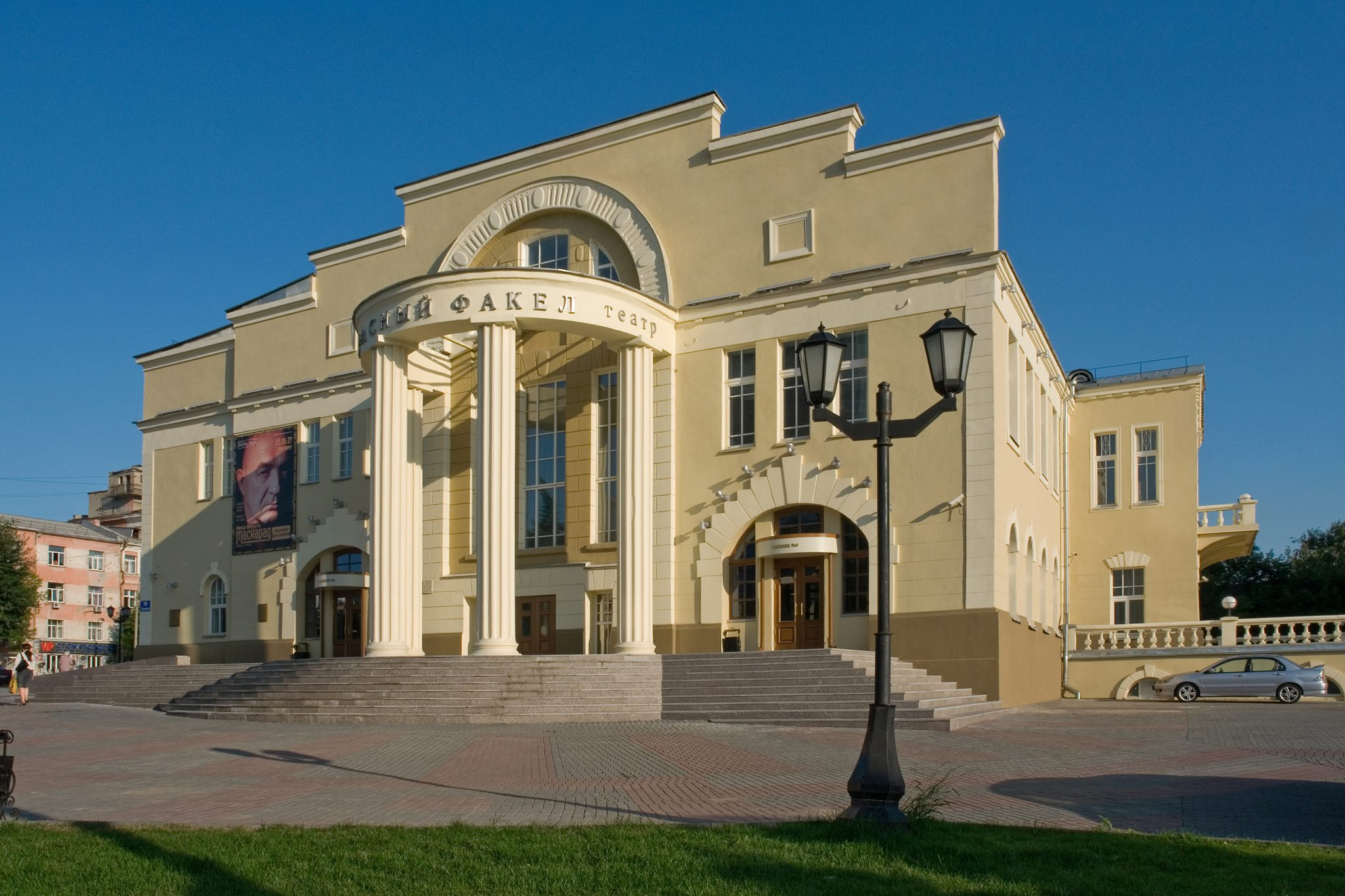
"Red Torch"

== Parks ==
=== Narymsky Square ===
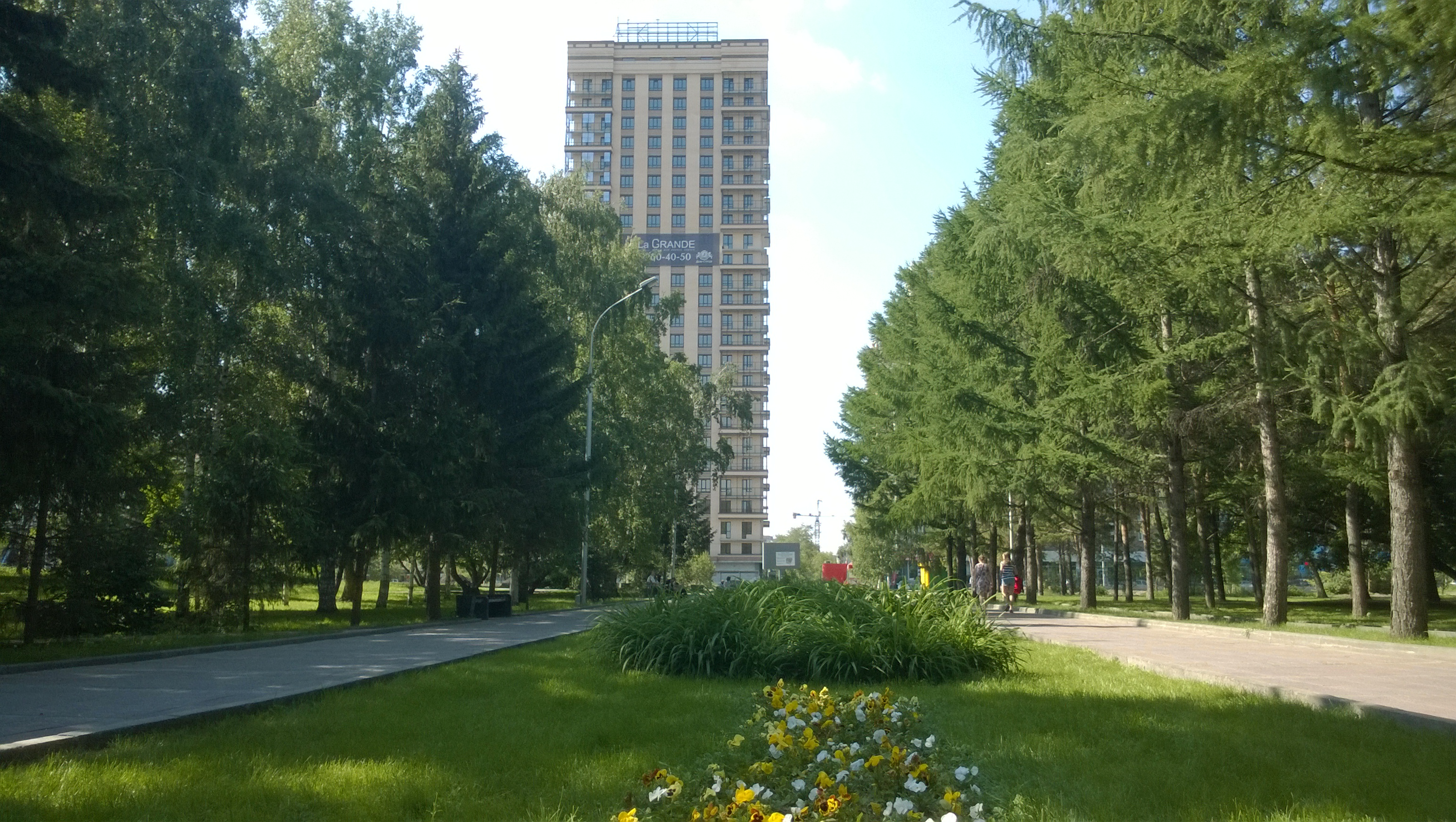

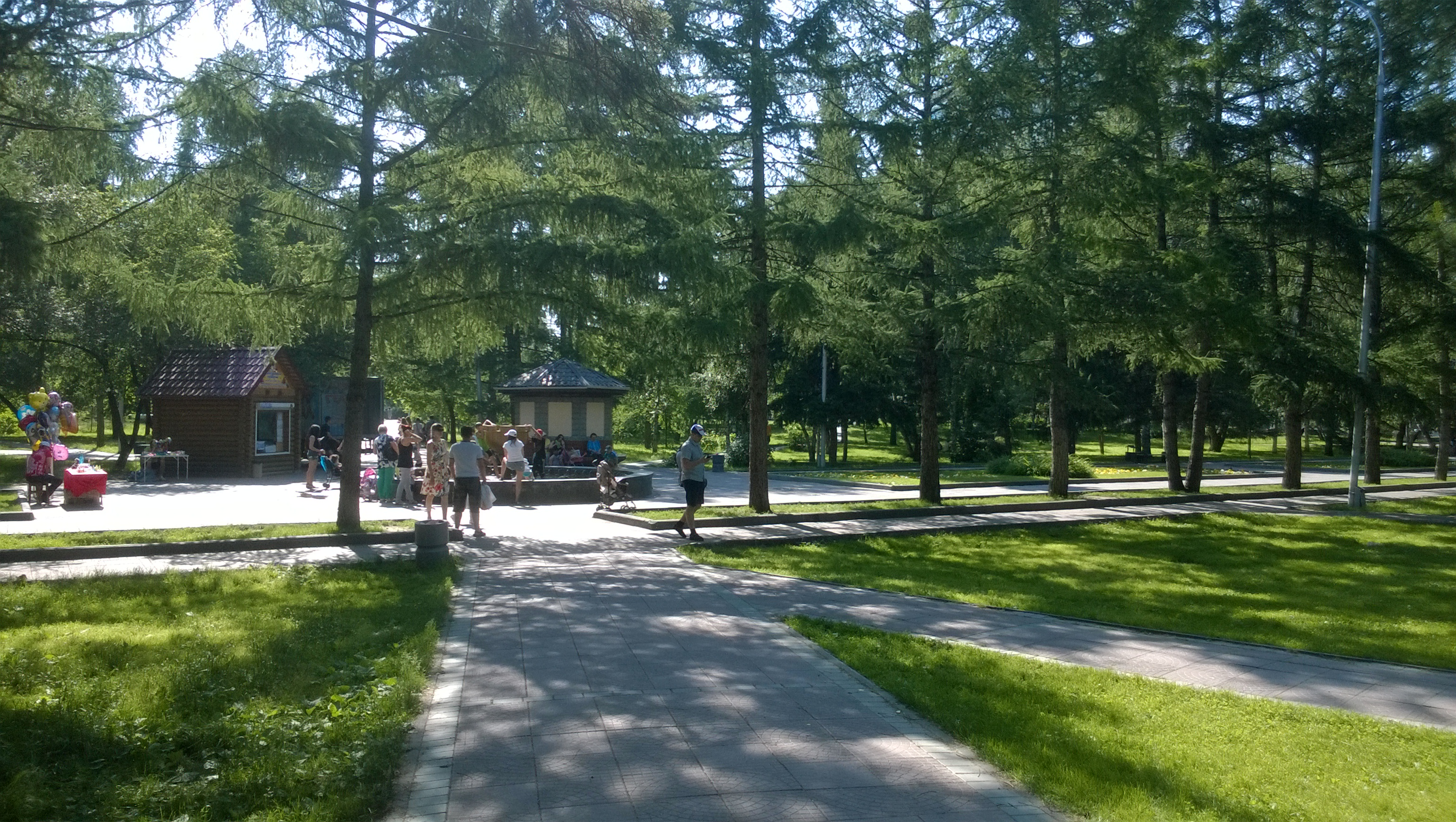

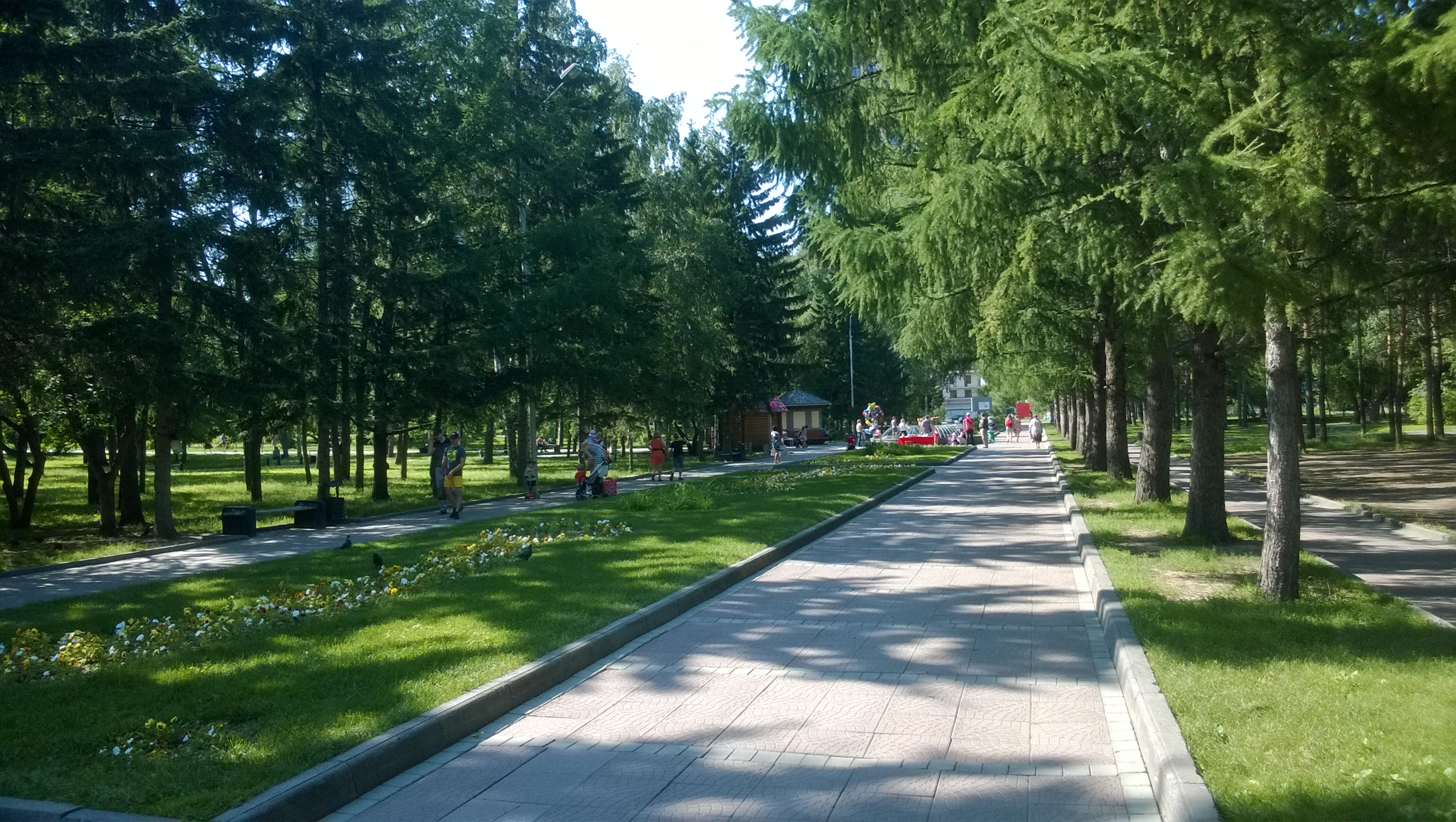

== Transportation ==
=== Railway ===
Three railway stations are located in the district: Novosibirsk-Glavny, Tsentr and Pravaya Ob.

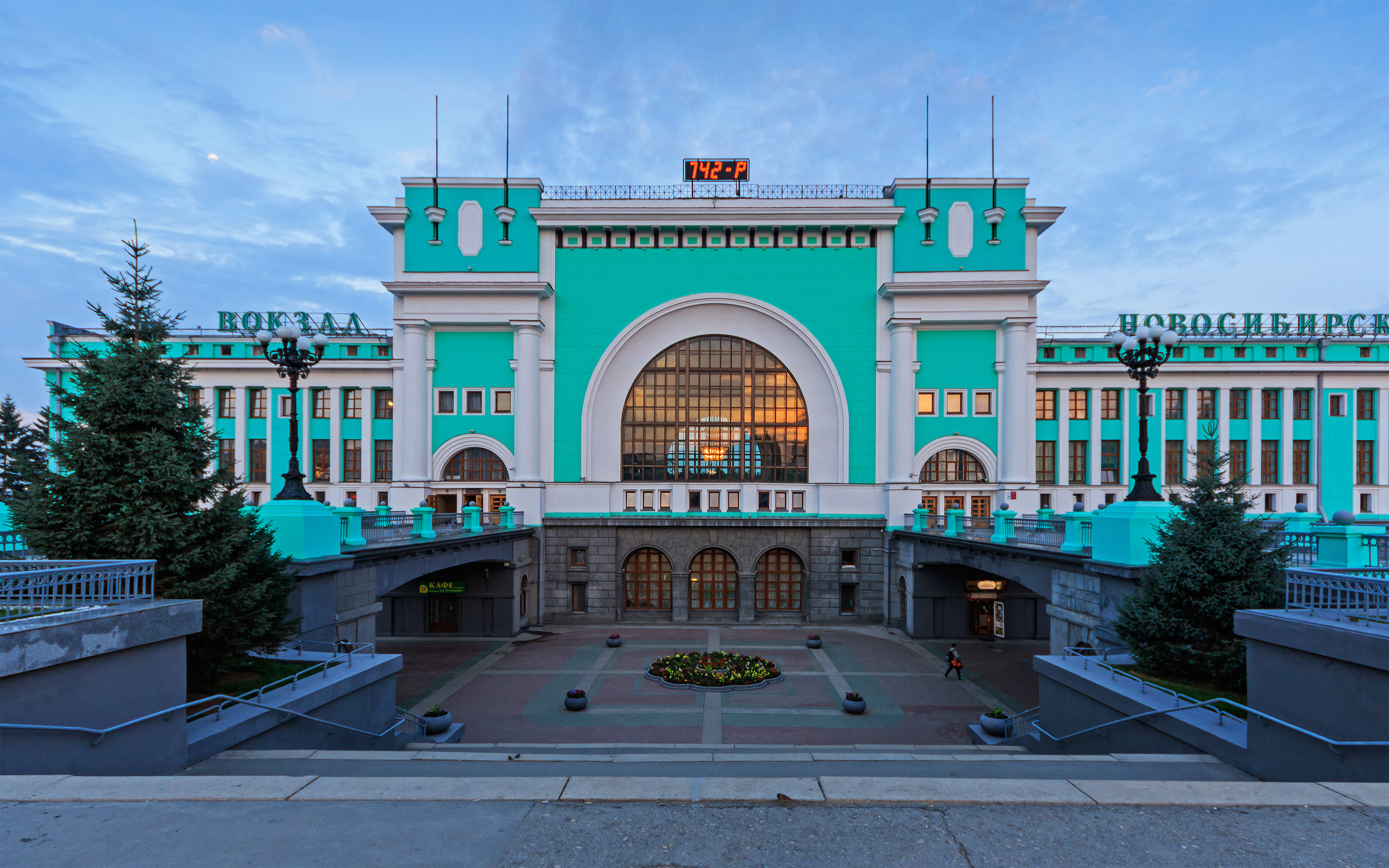
Novosibirsk-Glavny Station

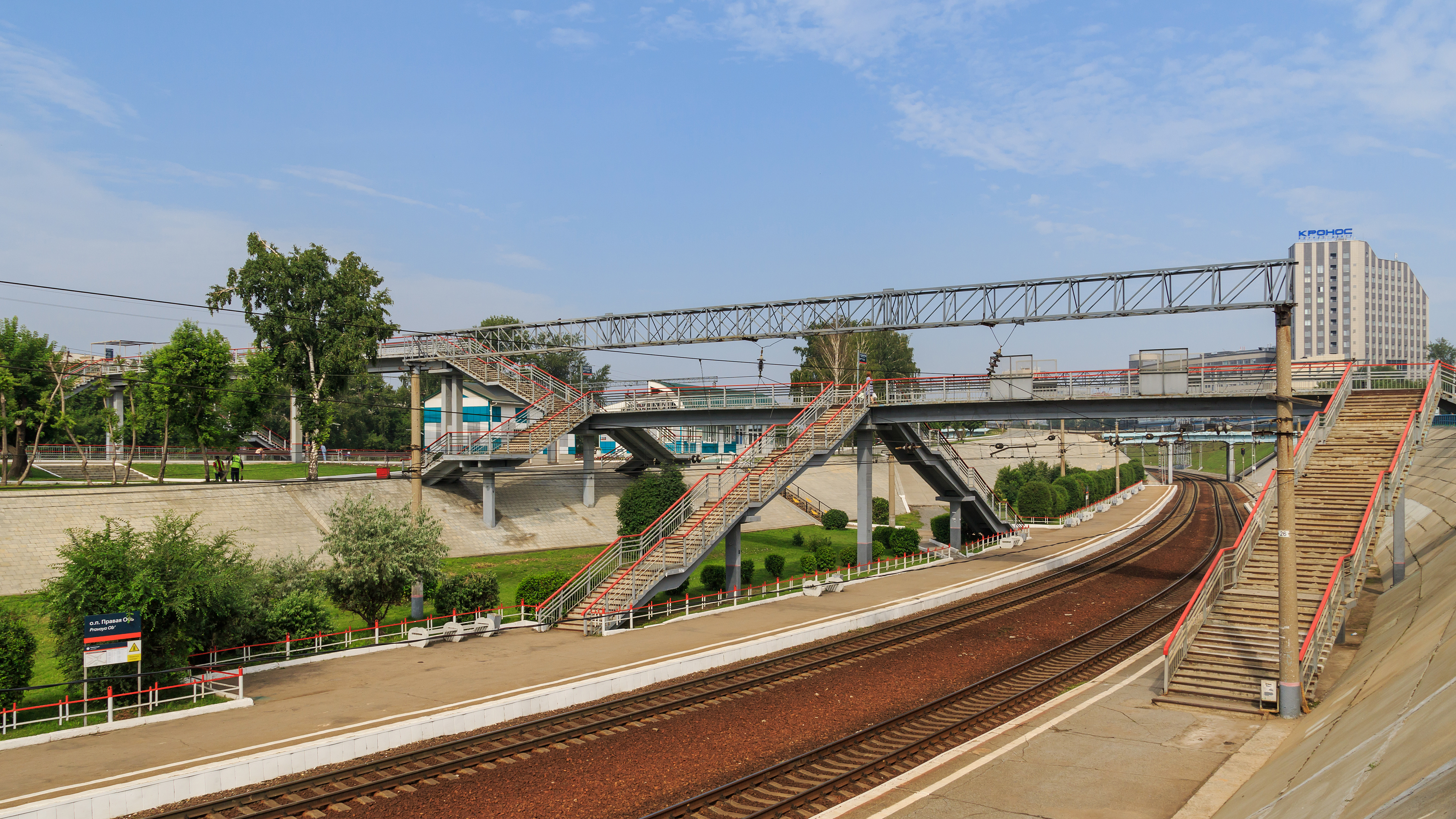
Pravaya Ob Station

=== Metro ===
One Novosibirsk Metro station is located in the district: Ploshchad Garina-Mikhaylovskogo.
