= Siberian Scientific Research Institute of Metrology =

Scientific organisation in Novosibirsk, Russia

- Established: 1944
- Director: Gennady Shuvalov
- Address: Dimitrov Prospekt 4, 630004, Novosibirsk, Russia
- Location: Novosibirsk, Russia
- Website: Official website

Siberian Scientific Research Institute of Metrology is a scientific organization in Zheleznodorozhny District of Novosibirsk, Russia. It was created in 1944.

== History ==
The institute was created in 1944 on the basis of evacuated laboratories of the Kharkov, Leningrad and Moscow institutes of metrology. The organization was called the Novosibirsk State Institute of Measures and Measuring Instruments. In 1955, a metrological base was created at the institute, which became the second metrological base of the USSR. In 1968, Novosibirsk State Institute of Measures and Measuring Instruments was renamed Siberian Scientific Research Institute of Metrology.

In 1993, the institute received the status of the State Scientific Metrological Center. In 2008, SNIIM creates the State primary standard for the unit of surface density of heat flux (GET 172–2008). In 2013, the Institute develops the State primary standard for the unit of angle of phase shift between two electrical signals in the frequency range from 0.1 MHz to 65 GHz (GET 207–2013).

== Activities ==
The institute creates, investigates and improves state primary standards, explores new physical effects. SNIIM improves measuring methods, sets the values of fundamental physical constants, it is engaged in determining the parameters of the Earth's rotation etc.

== Products ==
SNIIM produces various measuring instruments: UKDP-1 (installation for measuring the complex dielectric constant), SIM-4 analyzer (device for measuring the mass fraction of water as a percentage in oil products), IMV (device for measuring the magnetic susceptibility of dia-, para-, and weakly magnetic substances and materials in solid, liquid, and powder states) etc.

== Standards ==
=== Primary standards ===
- State primary standard of unit of electric capacity (ГЭТ 107–77)
- State primary standard for the unit of surface density of heat flux (ГЭТ 172–2008)
- State primary standard of units of relatives of dielectric and magnetic permeabilities in the frequency range from 1 MHz to 18 GHz (ГЭТ 174–2009)
- State primary standard of a unit of wave resistance in coaxial waveguides (ГЭТ 75–2011)
- State primary standard of the electric Q factor (ГЭТ 139–2013)
- State primary standard for the unit of angle of phase shift between two electrical signals in the frequency range from 0.1 MHz to 65 GHz (ГЭТ 207–2013)

=== Secondary standards ===
State secondary standard of the unit of time and frequency (ВЭТ 1–19), state secondary standard of the unit of dielectric permittivity (ВЭТ 129-2-91), state secondary standard of the unit of magnetic permeability of ferromagnets (ВЭТ 122-1-93) etc.

== Awards ==
In 1984, the institute was awarded the Order of the Red Banner of Labour.

== Bibliography ==
- Ламин В. А. (2003). Энциклопедия. Новосибирск. Новосибирск: Новосибирское книжное издательство. p. 774. ISBN 5-7620-0968-8.
