= Oktyabrsky District, Novosibirsk =

Oktyabrsky City District
- District
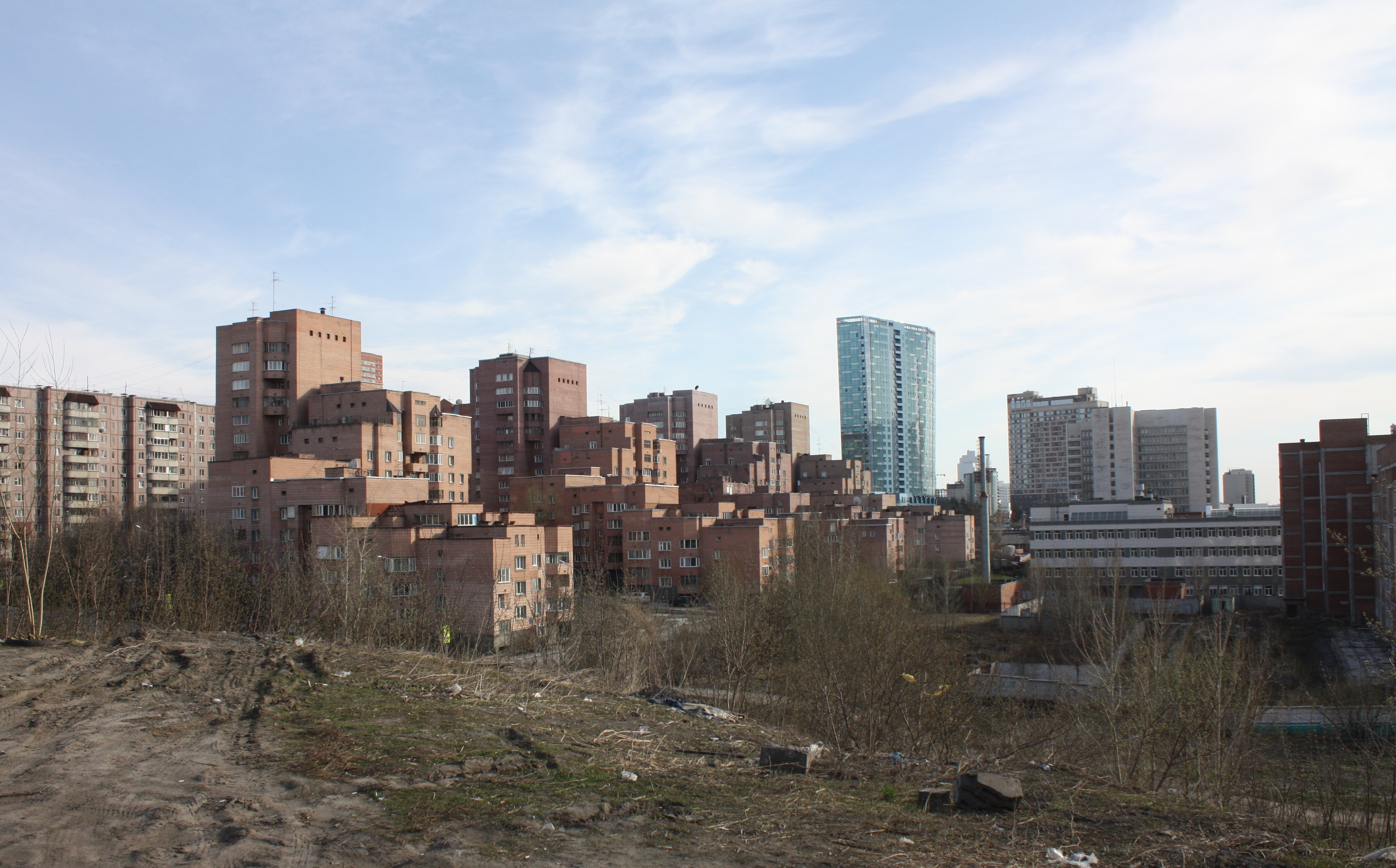

- Coat of arms
- Location of Oktyabrsky City District
- Coordinates: 55°01′N 82°57′E
- Country: Russia
- Federal subject: Novosibirsk
- Established: 1929

Area
  - Total: 58.9 km^{2} (22.7 sq mi)

Oktyabrsky City District is an administrative district (raion), one of the 10 raions of Novosibirsk, Russia. The area of the district is 58.9 square kilometres (22.7 sq mi). Population: 225,879 (2017).

== History ==
- 1929 – Zakamensky District was renamed the Oktyabrsky District.

== Streets ==
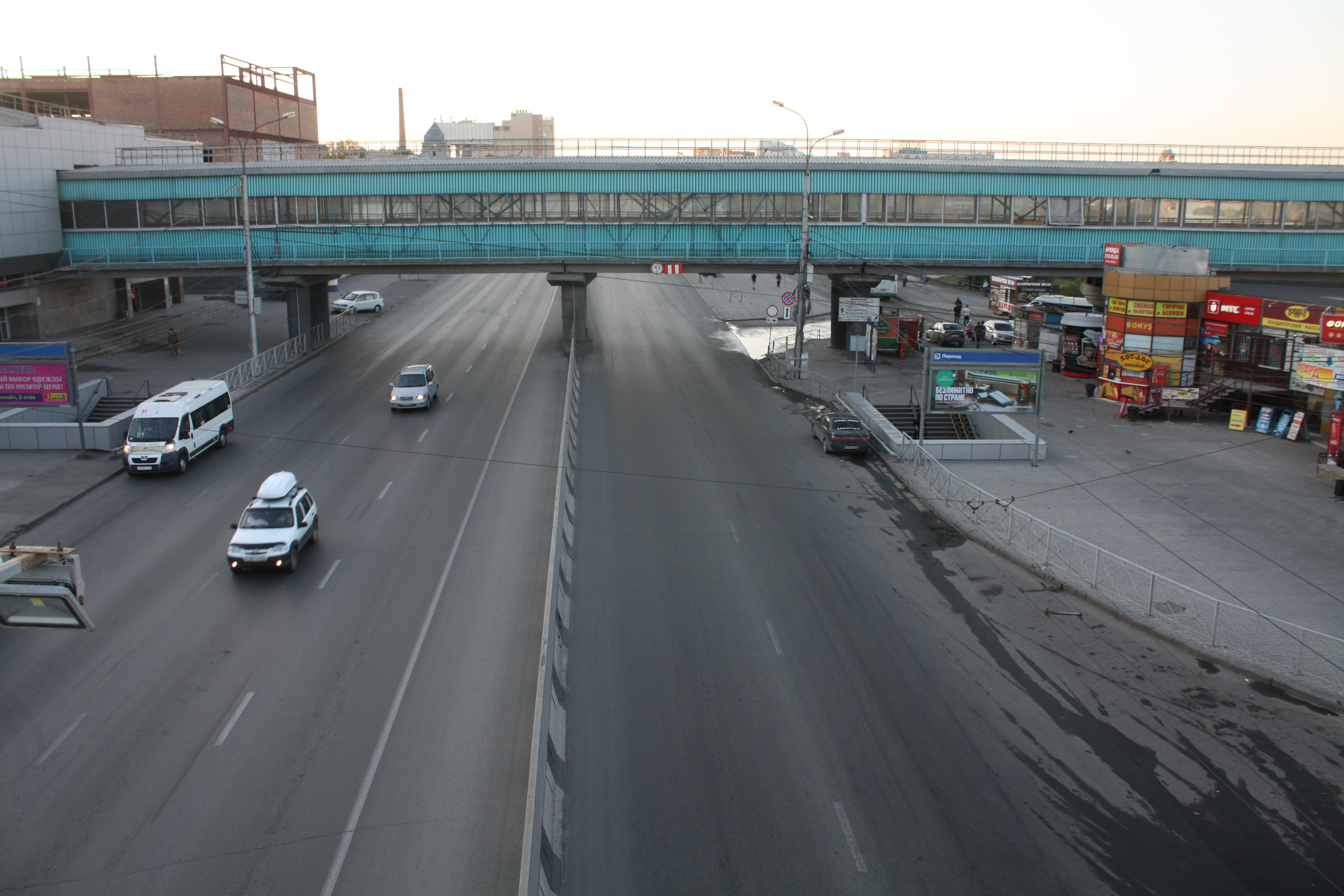
Bolshevistskaya Street

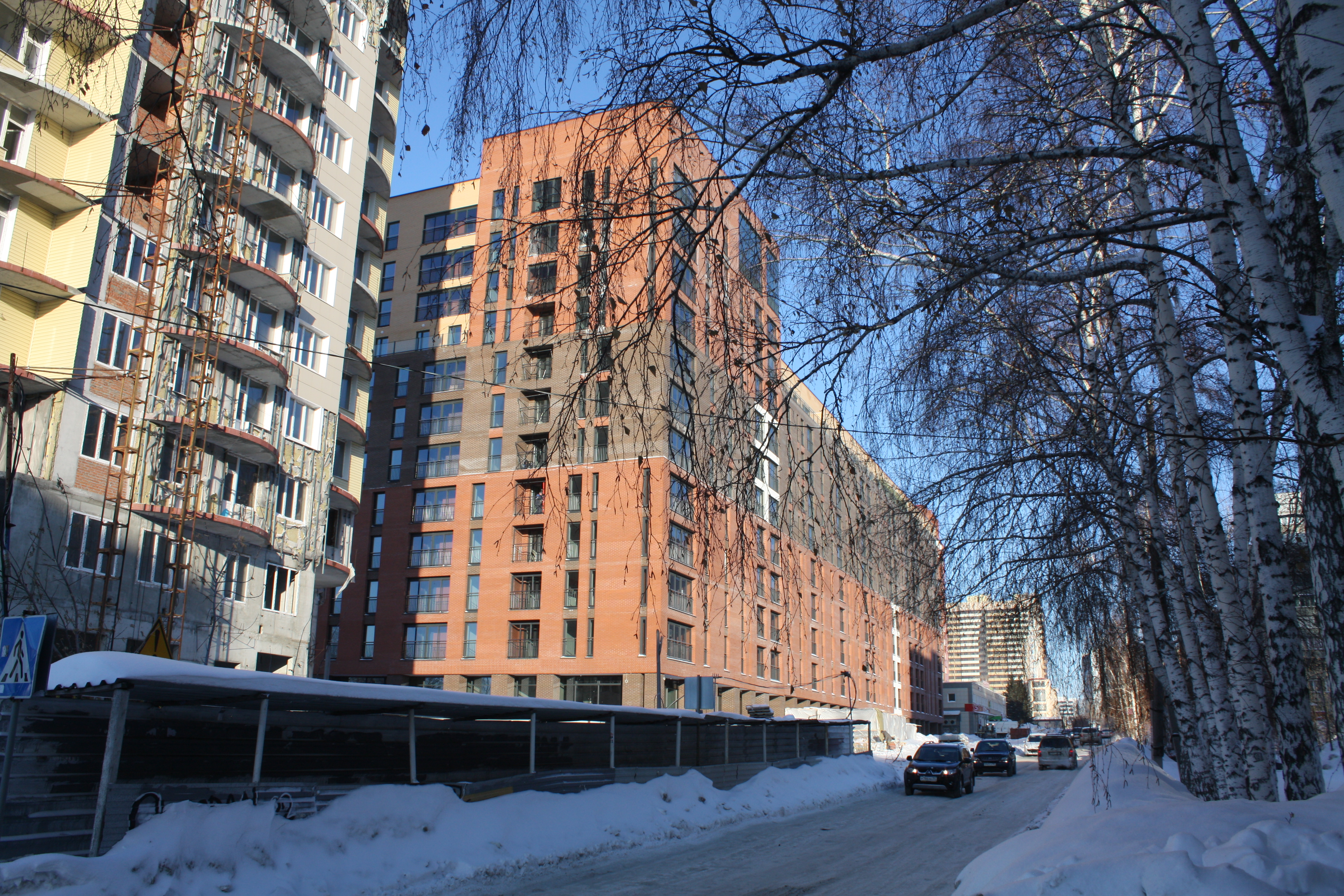
Sacco and Vanzetti Street

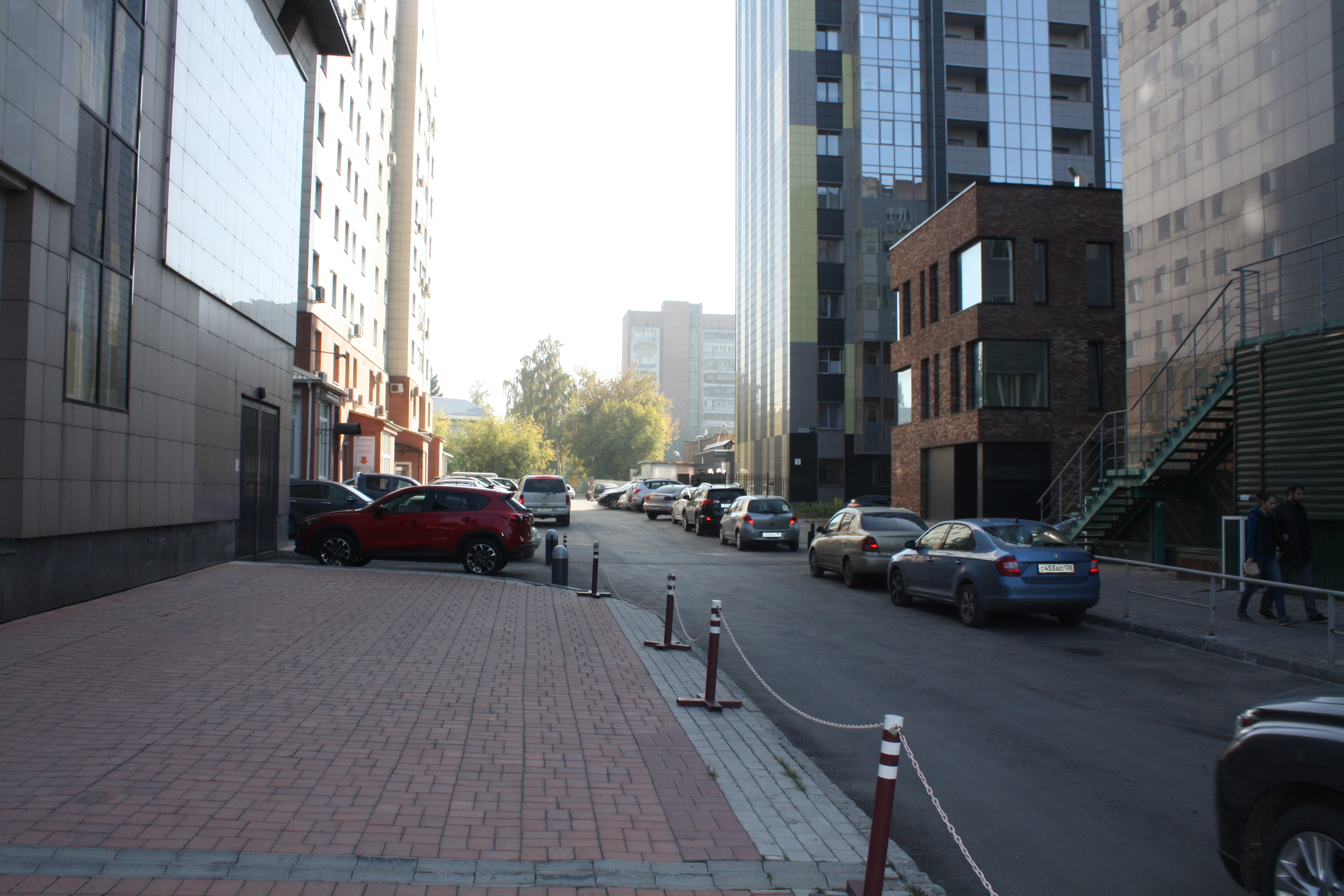
9 November Street

== Architecture ==
=== Tsarist architecture ===
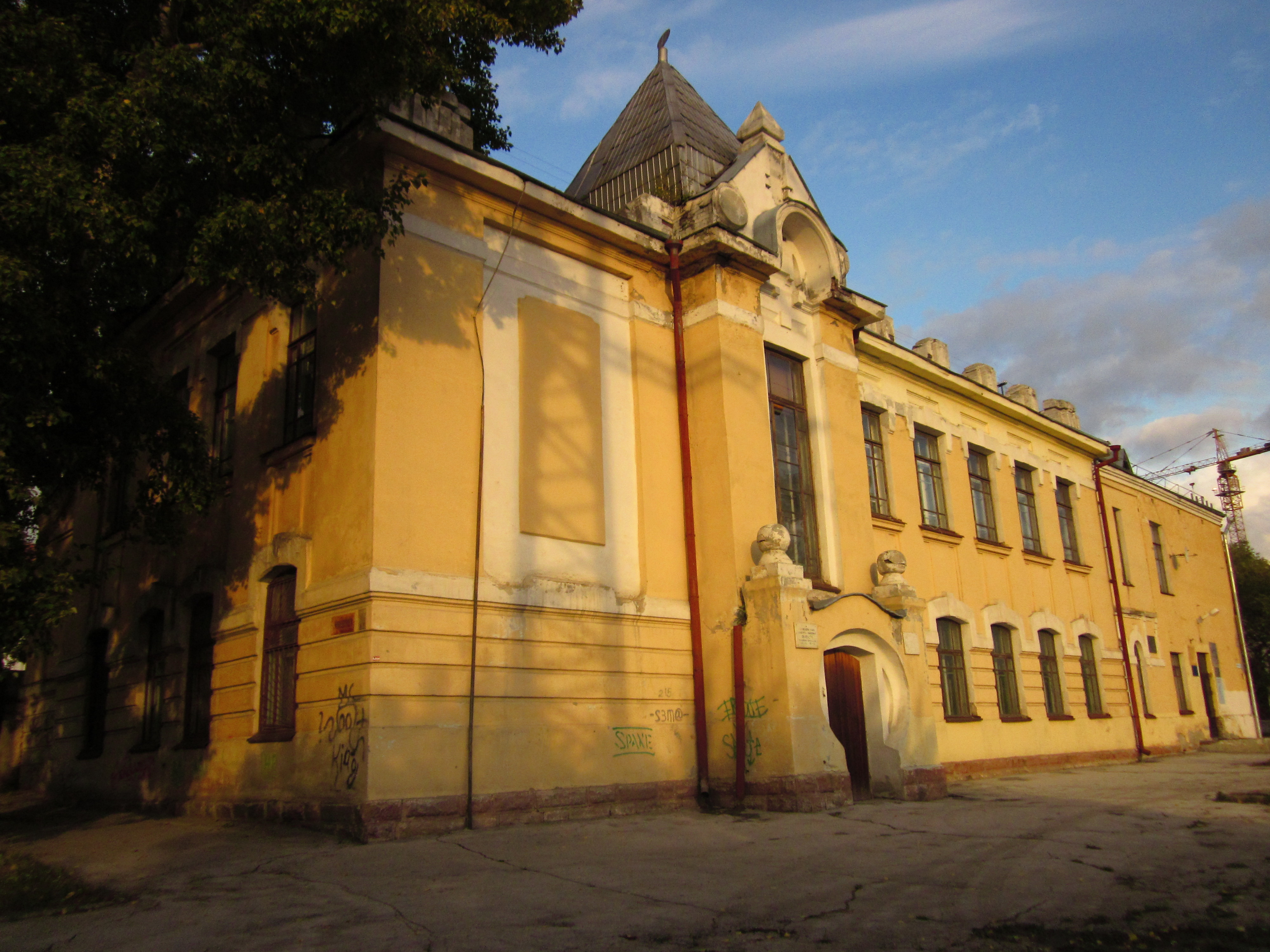
Yakushev Street, 1912

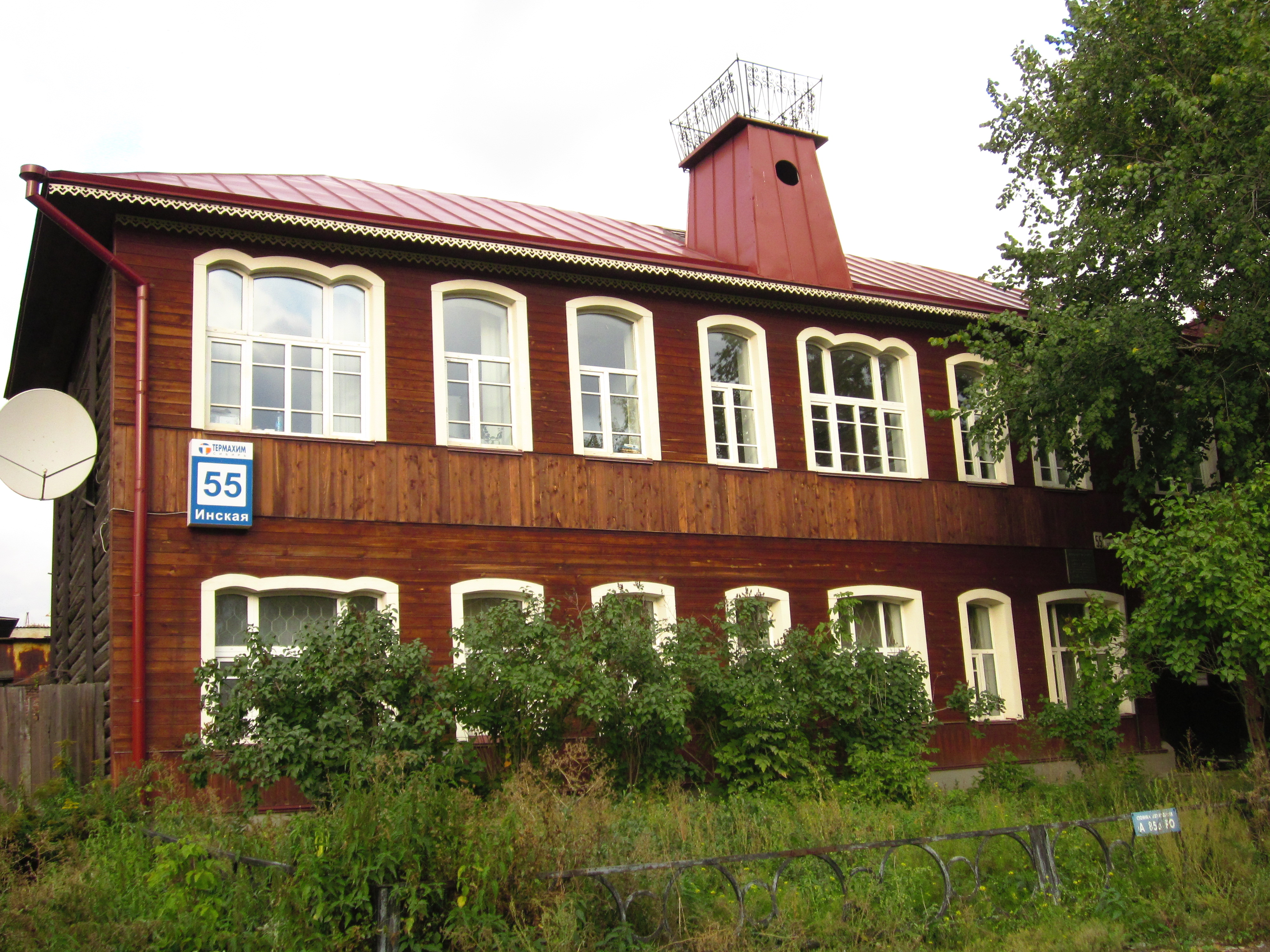
Inskaya Street 55, 1908

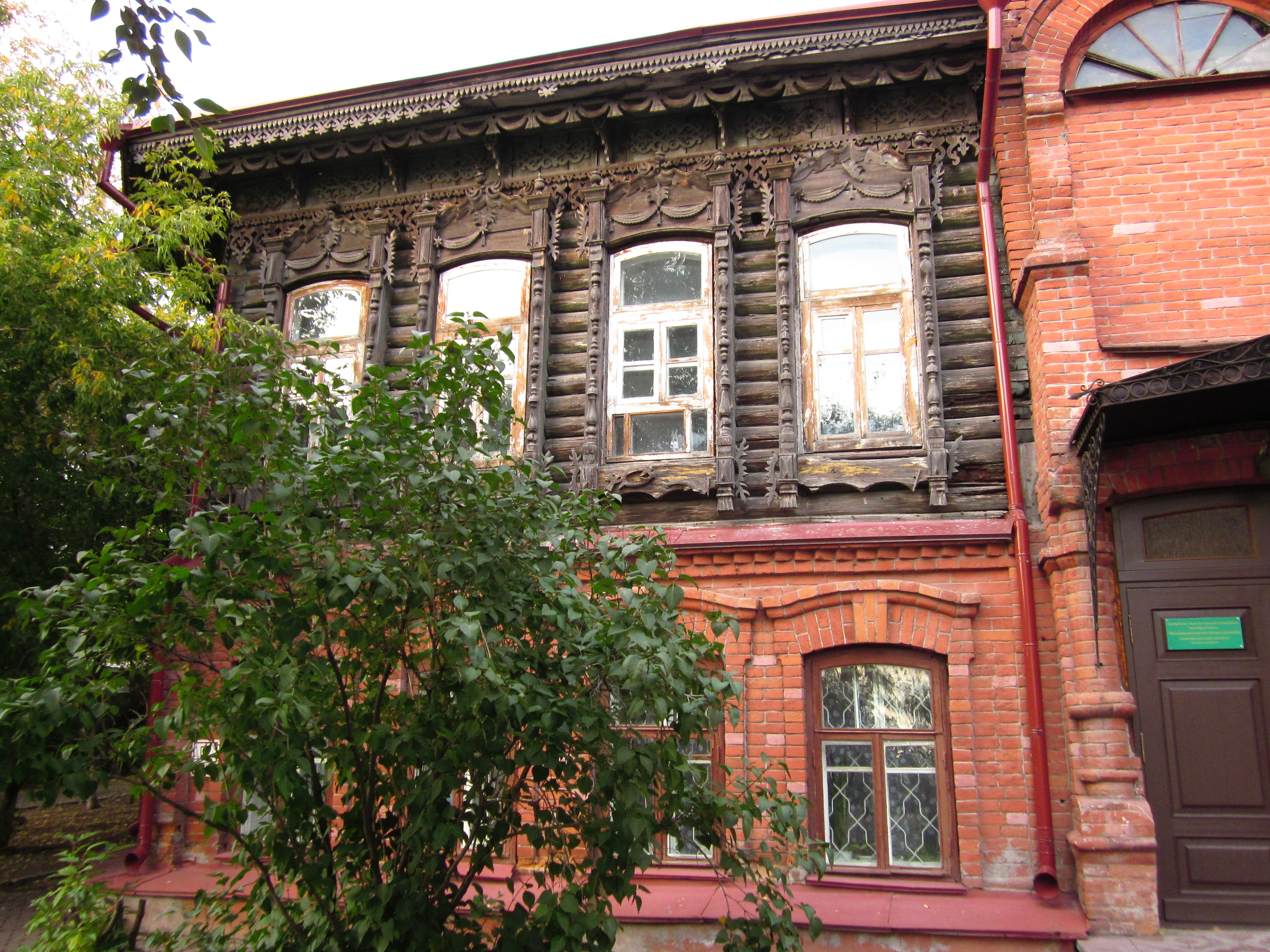
House of Terentyevs

=== Soviet architecture ===
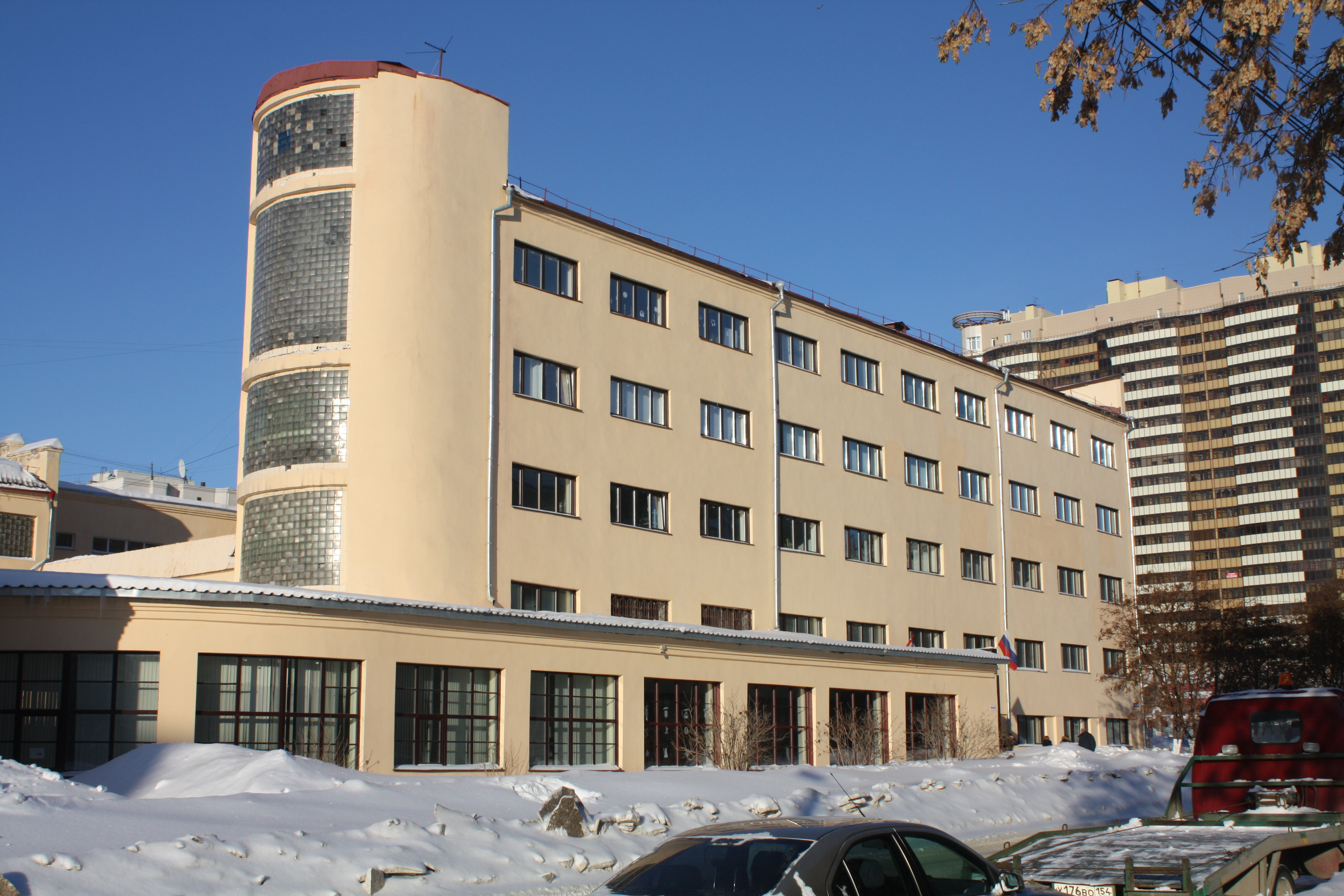
Chemical Engineering Technical School, 1932

=== Post-soviet architecture ===
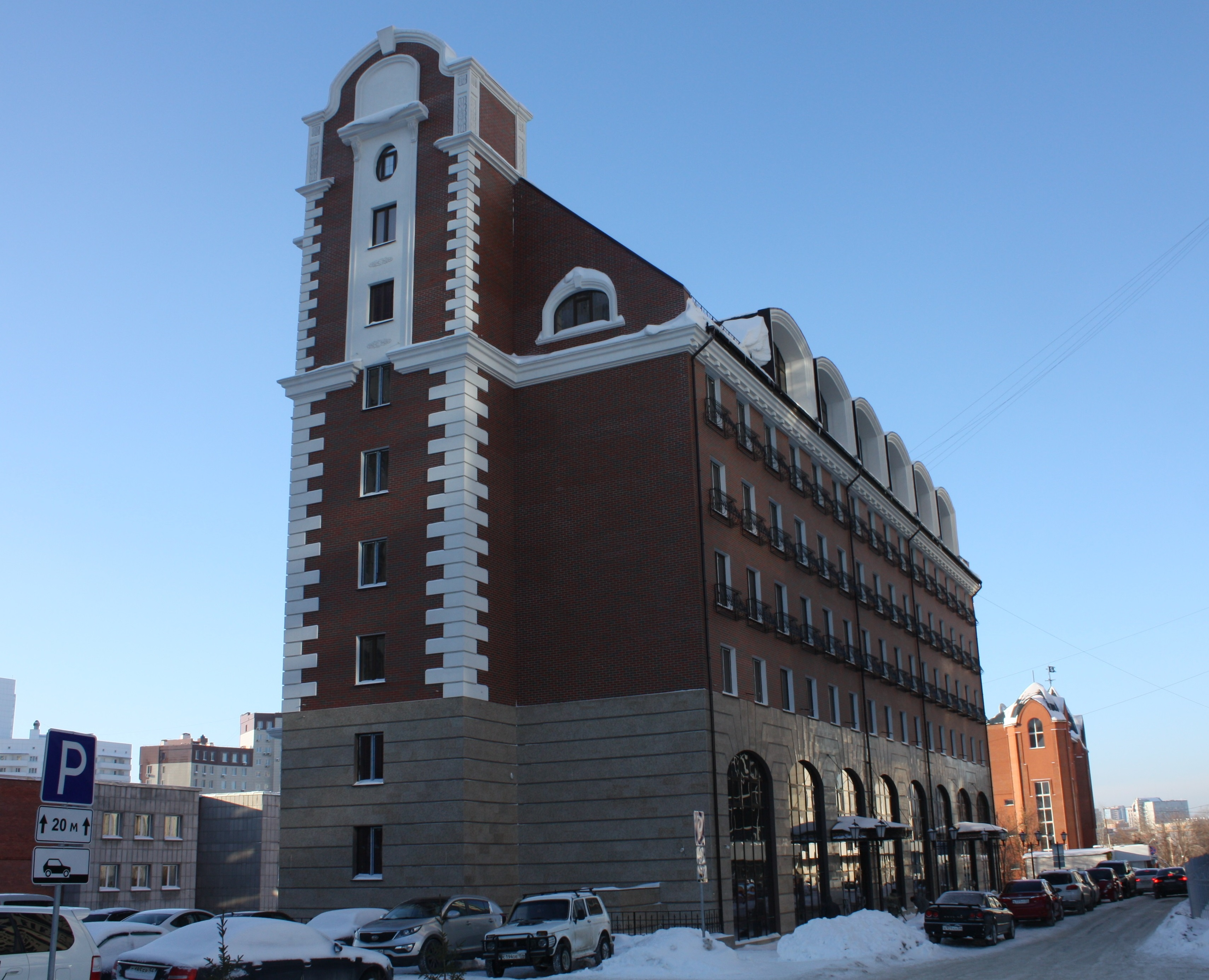
Klassika Business Centre, 2017

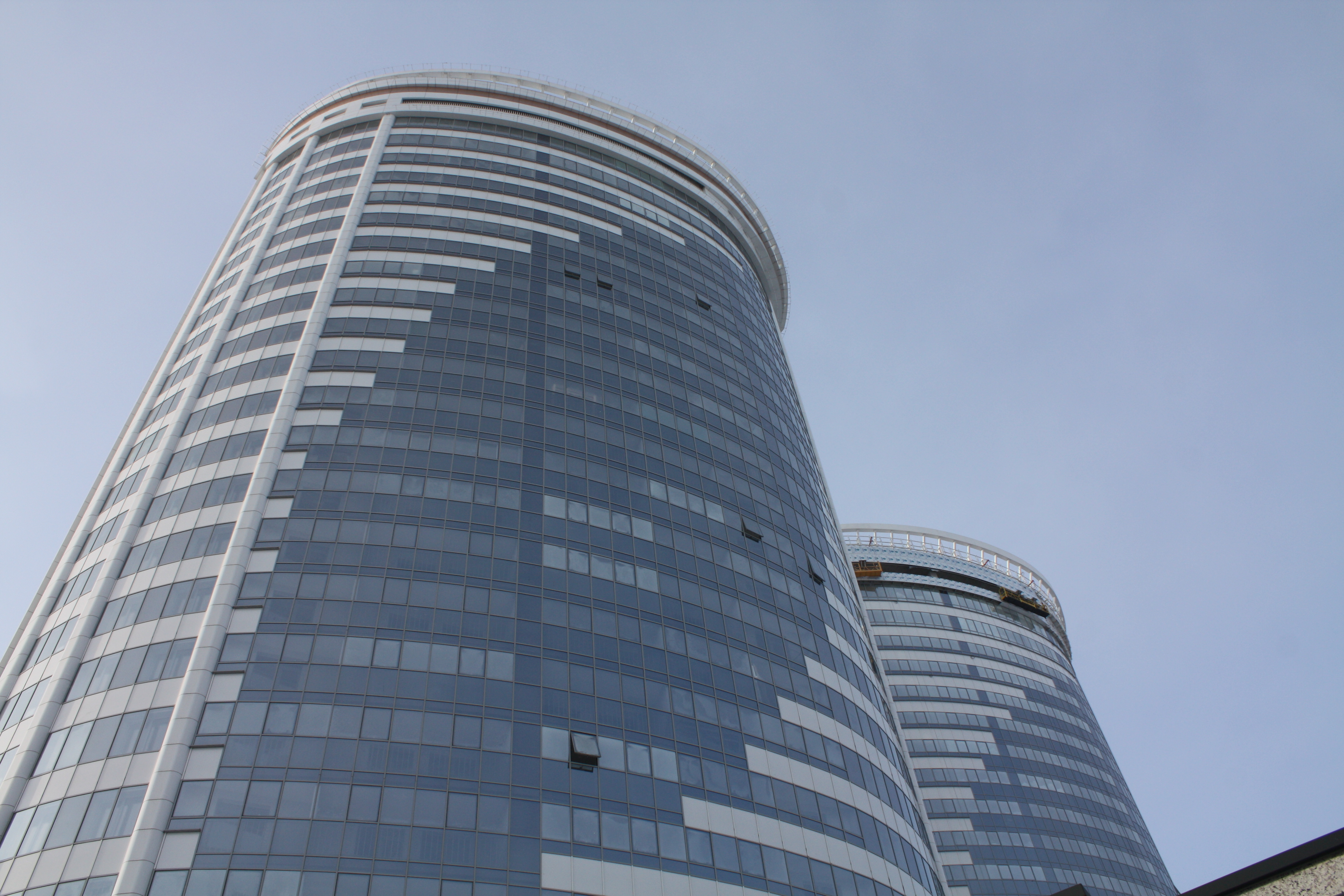
Flotiliya Housing Estate

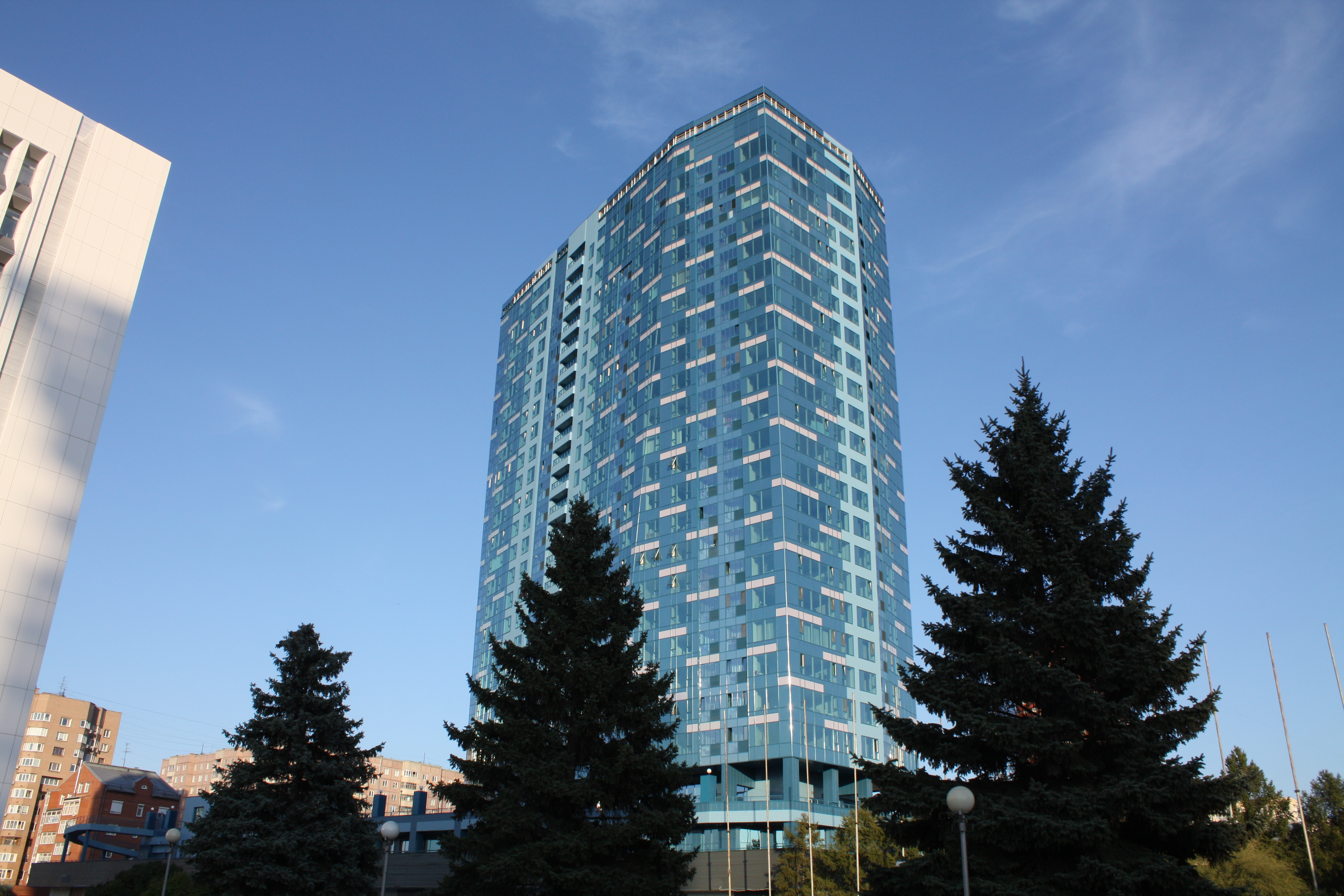
Status Housing Estate

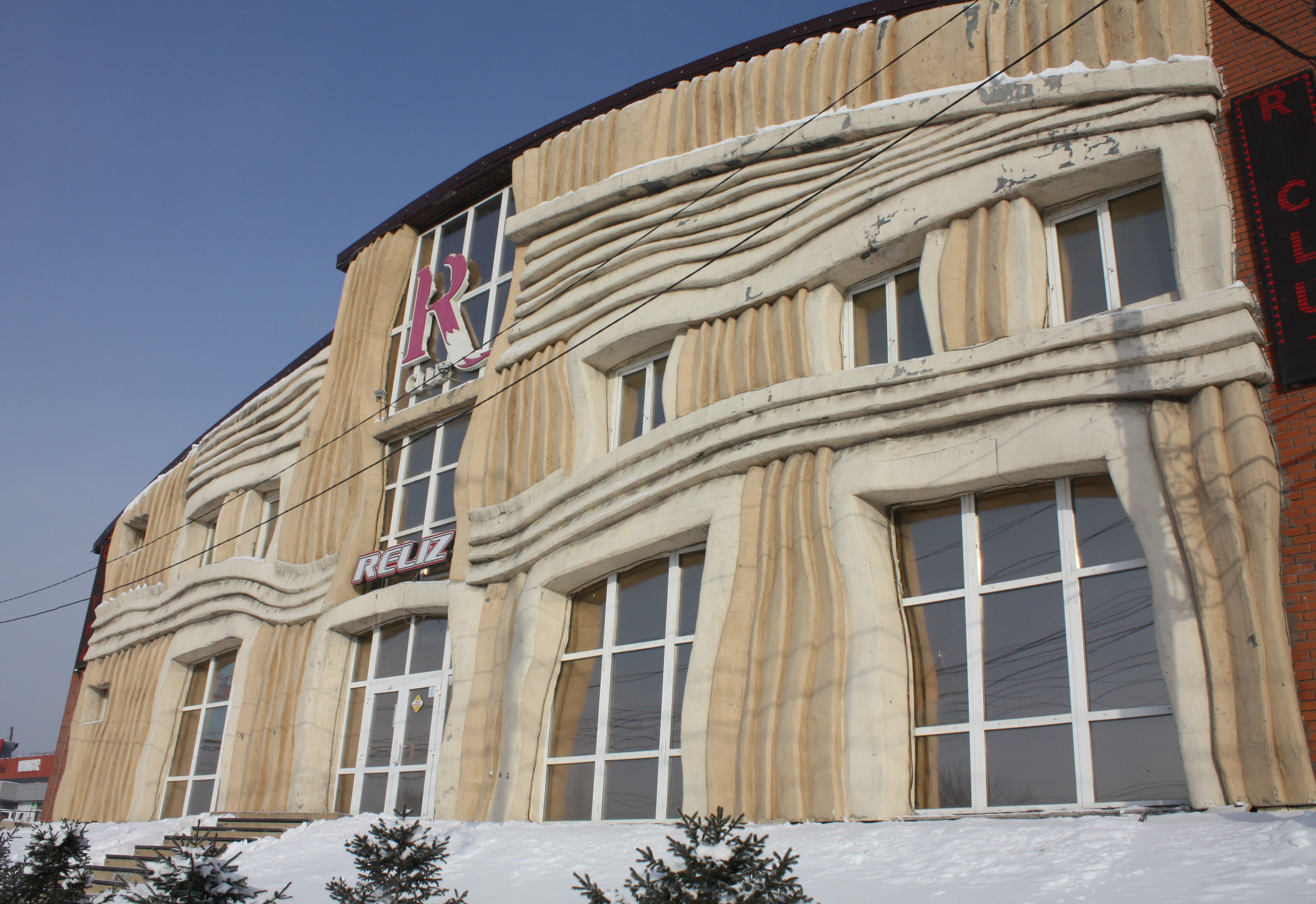
"Drunk House"

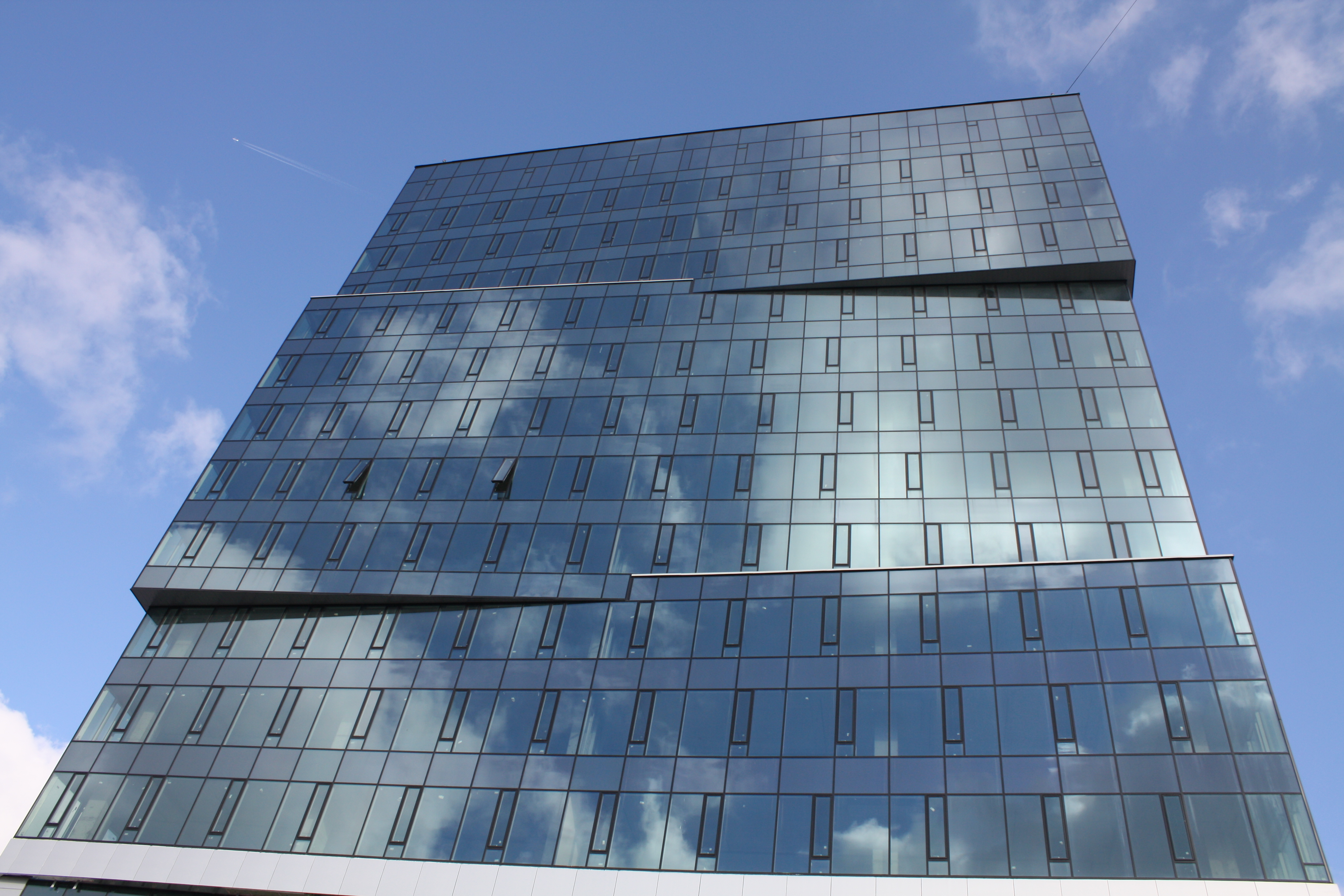
Kirov Street 23

== Tourist attractions ==
=== Mikhailovskaya Embankment ===
The Mikhailovskaya Embankment is located between Bolshevistskaya Street and Ob River.

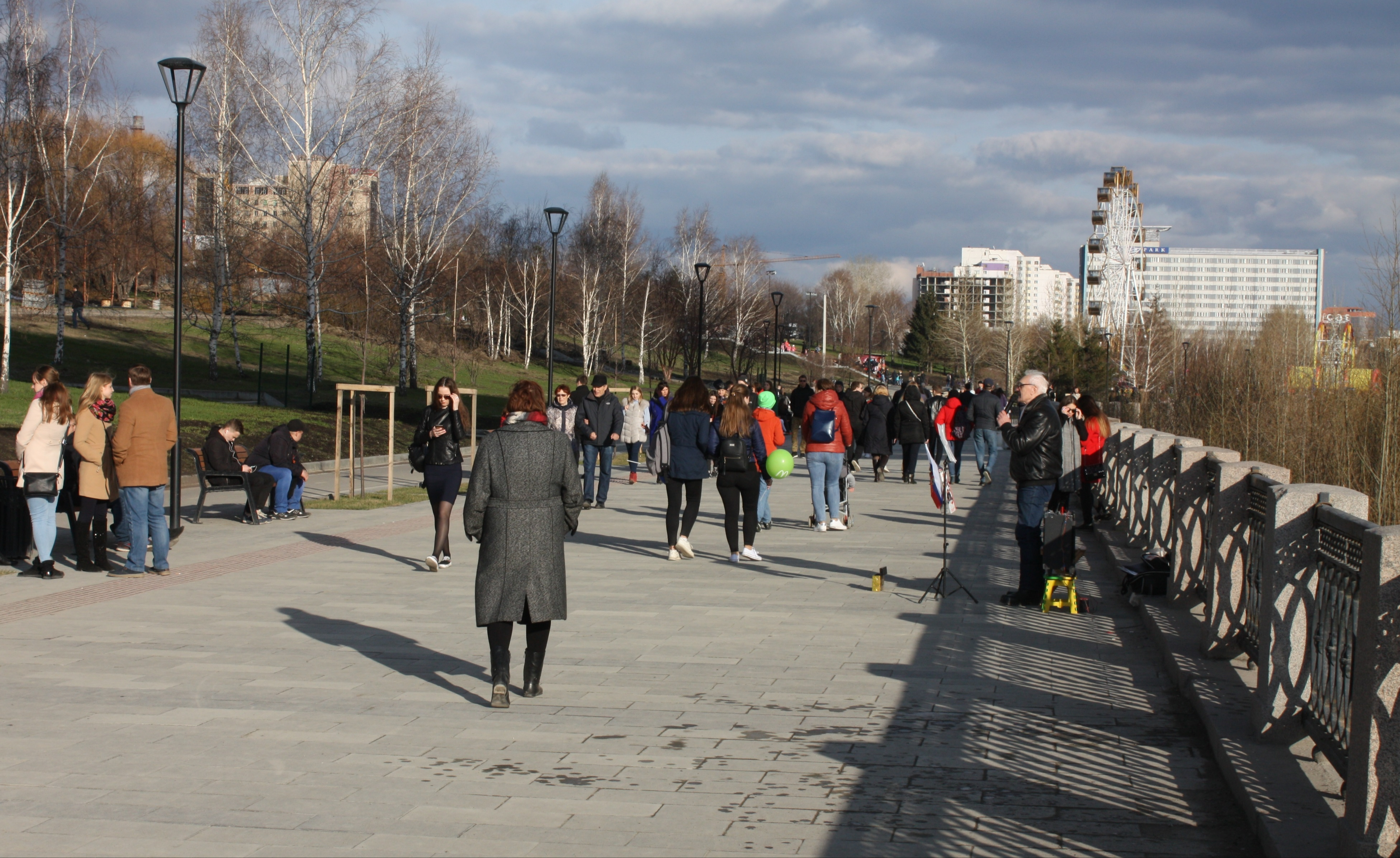

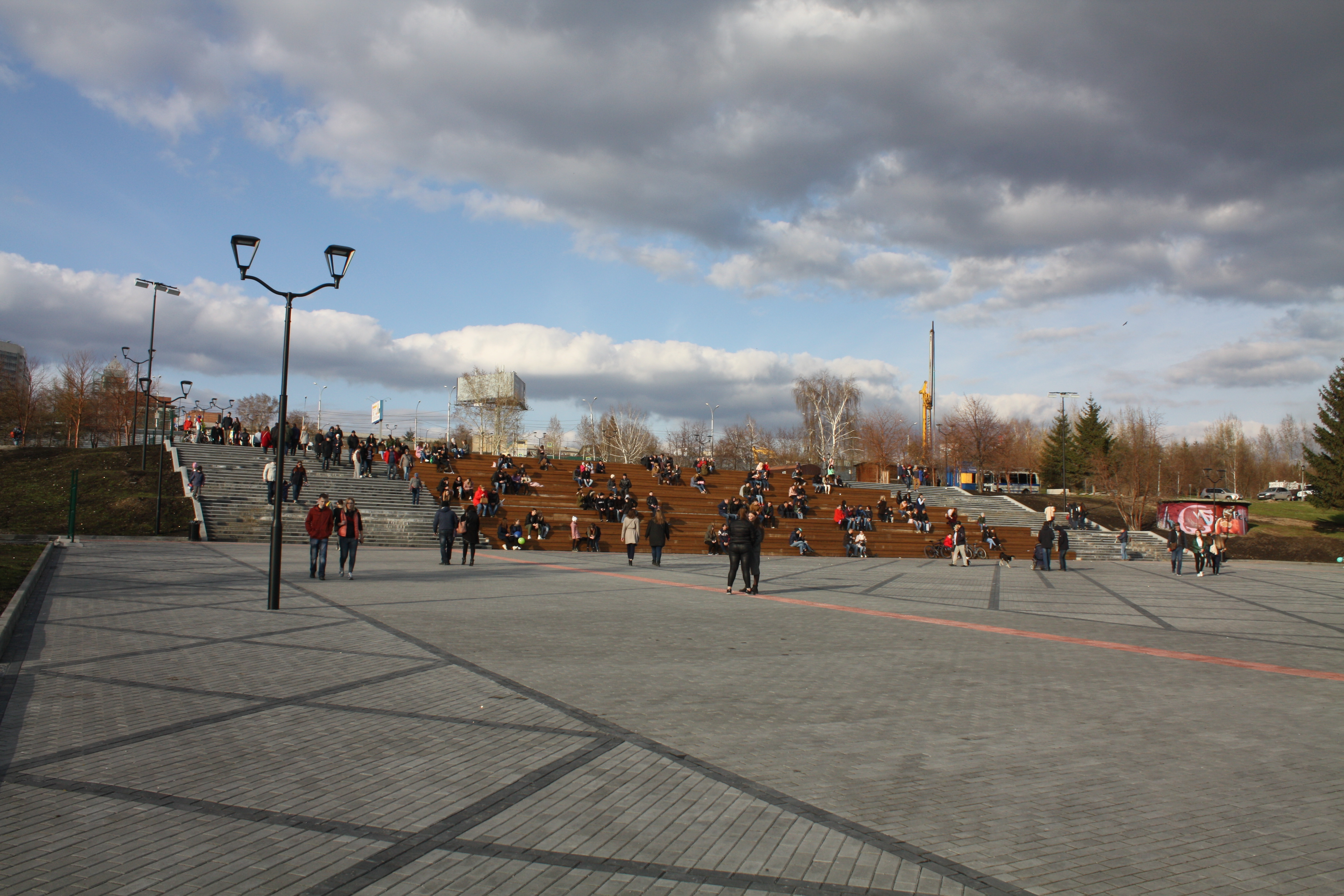

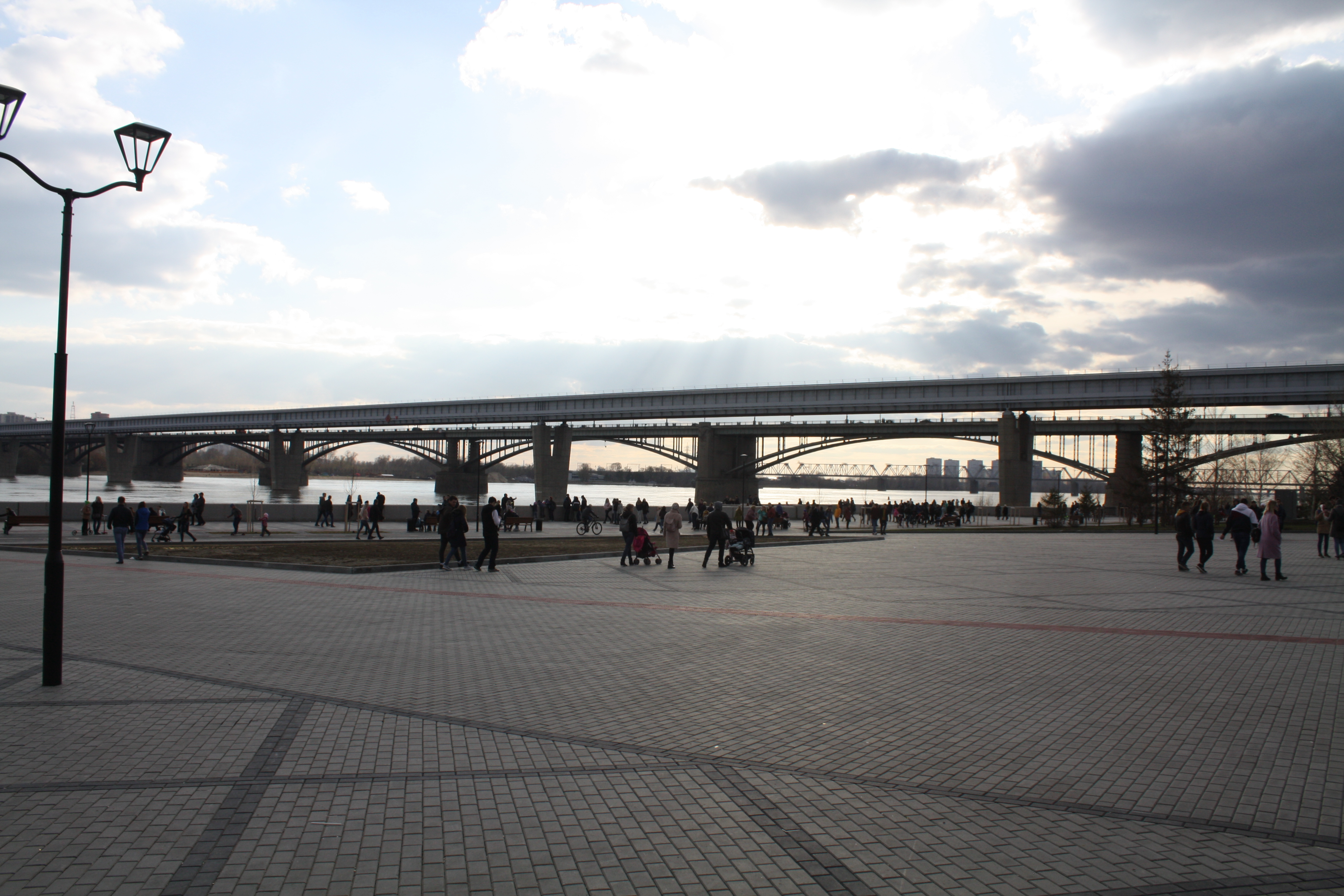

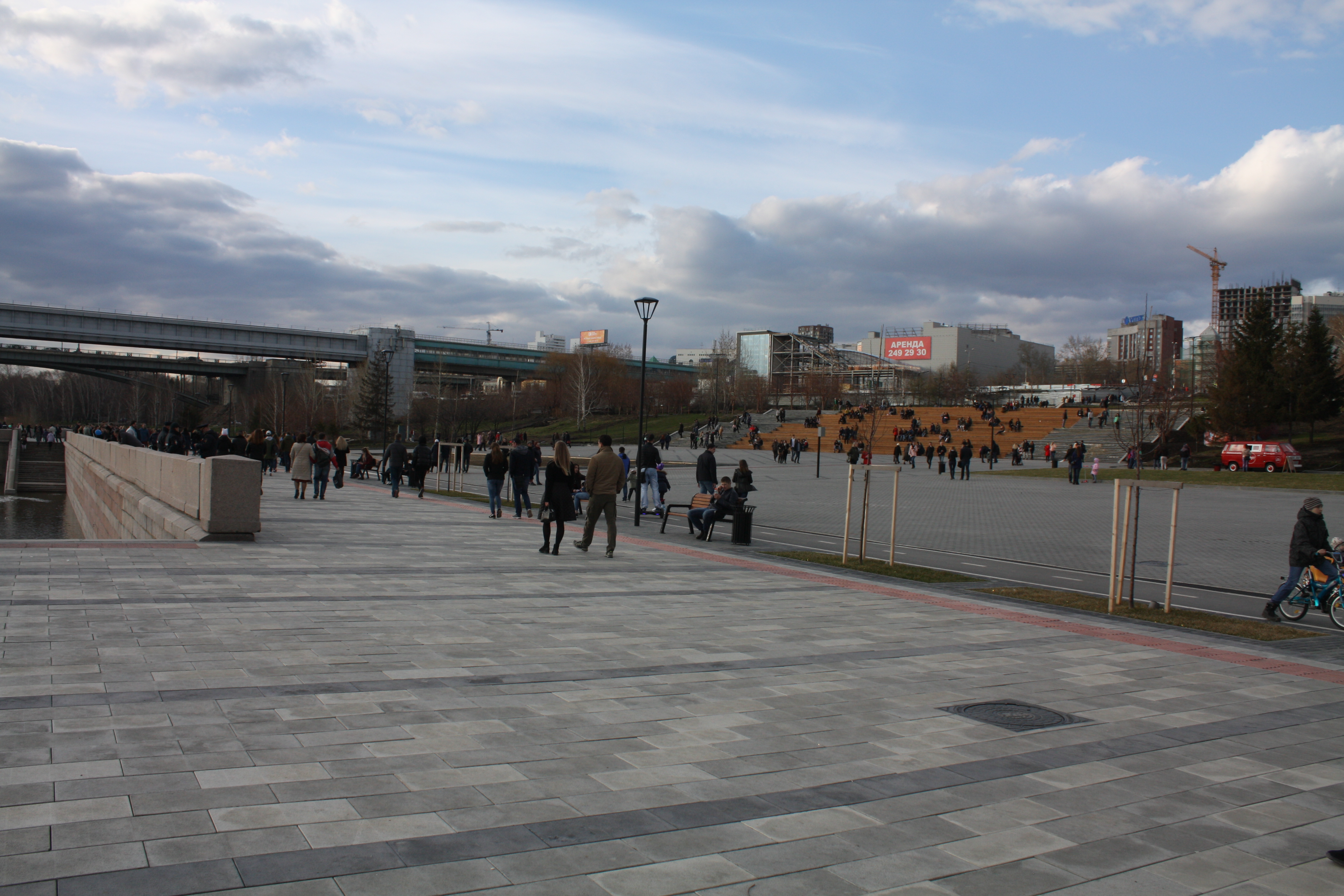

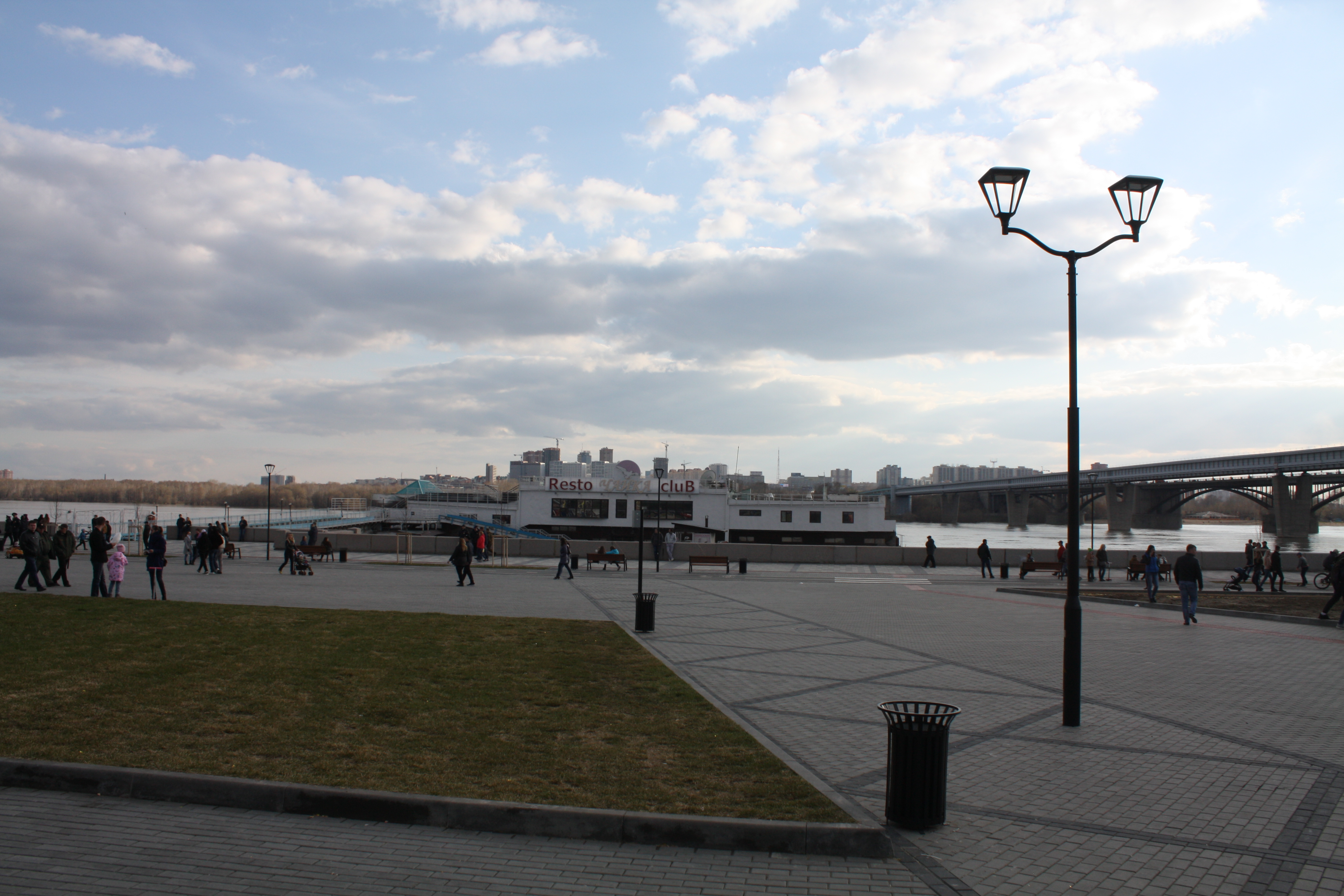

=== Large Novosibirsk Planetarium ===
Large Novosibirsk Planetarium is located in the Klyuch-Kamyshenskoye Plateau Micridistrict. It was opened in 2012. One of the two planetariums of Novosibirsk.

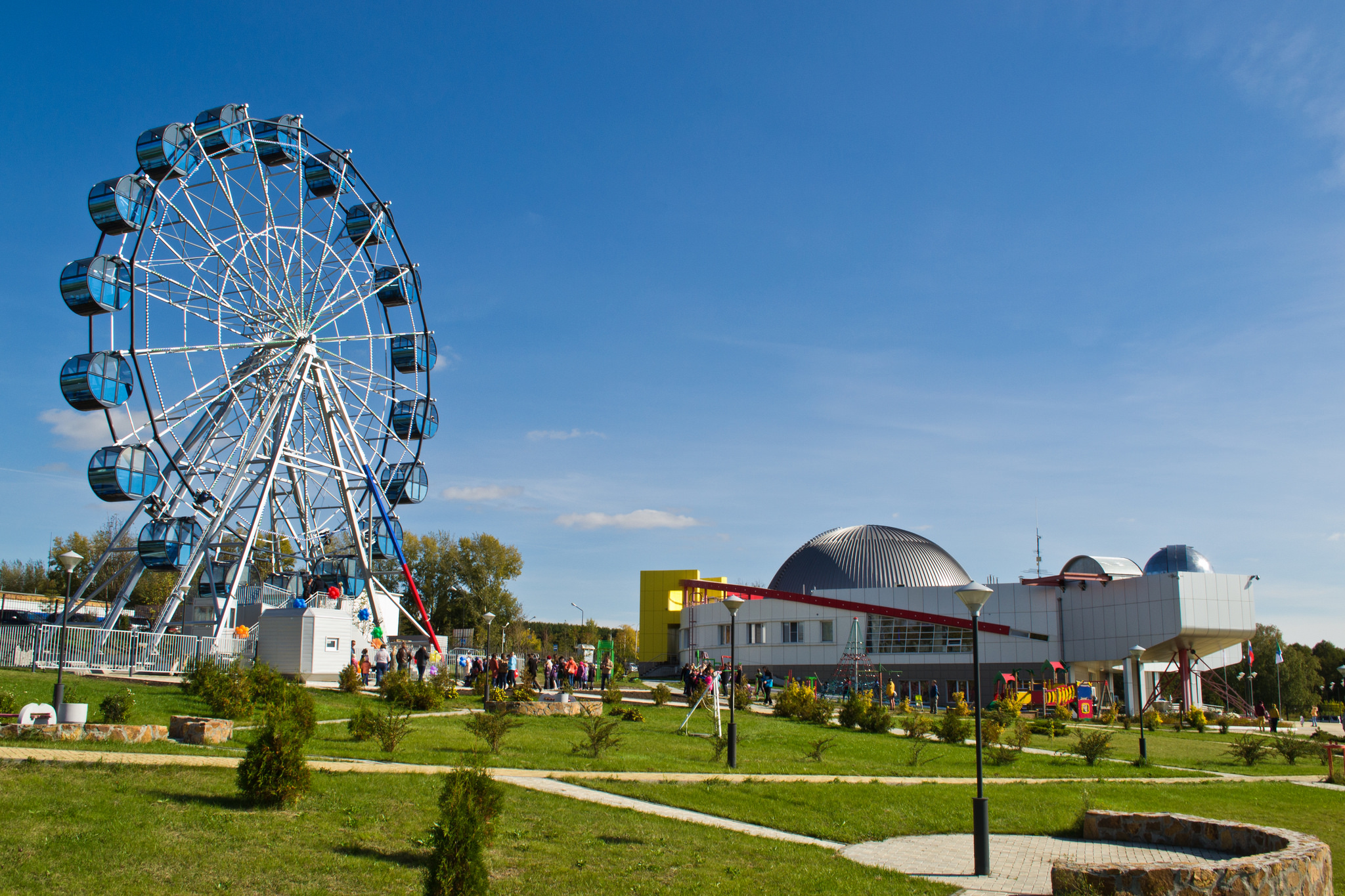

== Education ==
=== Universities ===
- Novosibirsk State Agricultural University
- Novosibirsk State Pedagogical University
- Novosibirsk State University of Architecture and Civil Engineering
- Siberian State University of Telecommunications and Informatics

=== Educational institutes ===
- Siberian Institute of Management, branch of the RANEPA
- Novosibirsk Military Institute

=== Libraries ===
- State Public Scientific & Technological Library
- Tolstoy Library is one of the oldest libraries in Novosibirsk.
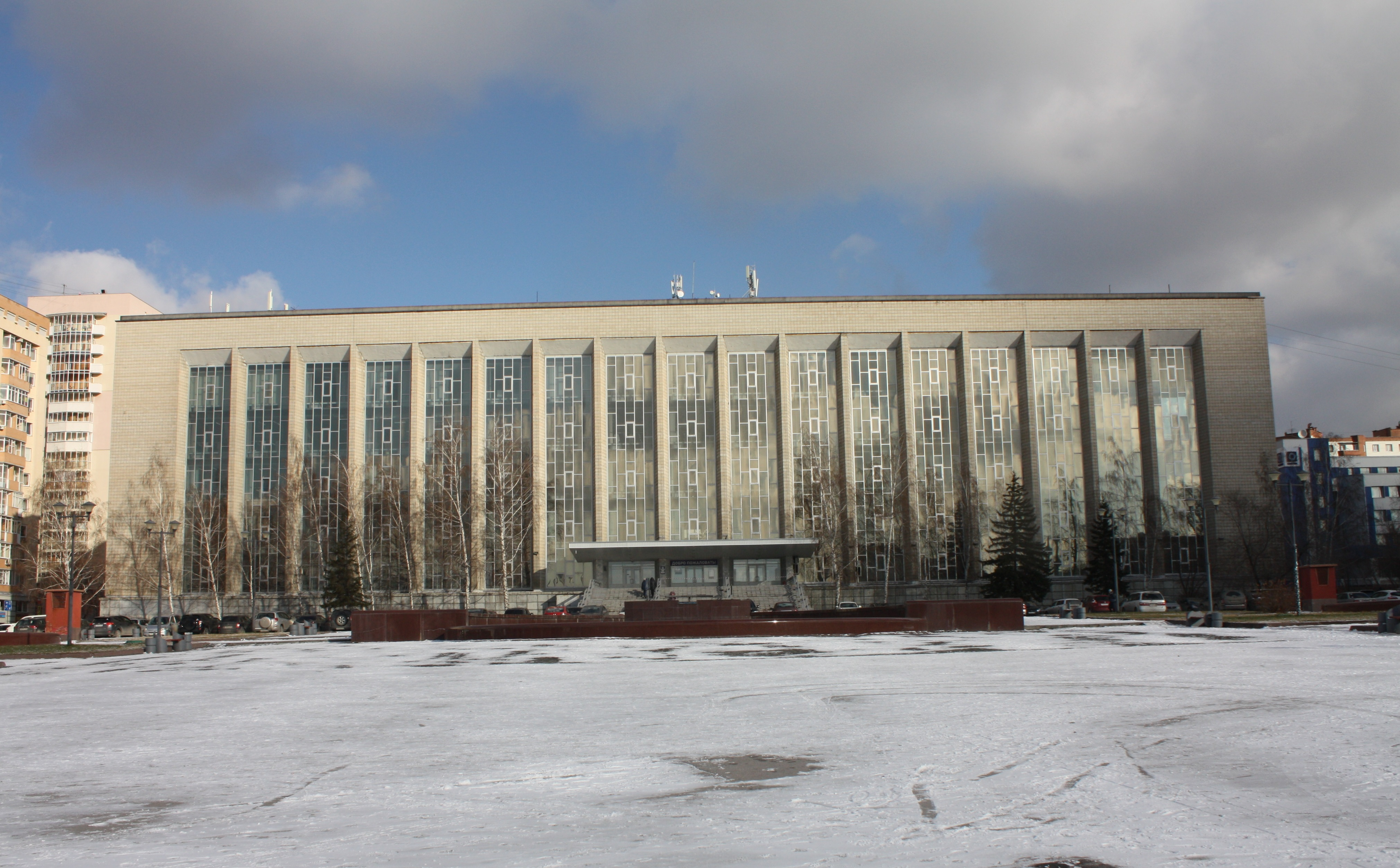
State Public Scientific & Technological Library

== Economy ==
=== Industry ===
- Elektrosignal Plant
- Novosibirsk Chocolate Factory
- Novosibirsk Tool Plant
- OJSC Novosibirsk Refinery is a plant that produces products of gold, silver, platinum and other precious metals.
- Novosibirsk Thermal Power Plant 5
- Oksid Plant
- Stankosib
- Trud Plant

== Transportation ==
=== River ===
Oktyabrsky City District has one passenger river terminal (Rechnoy Vokzal).

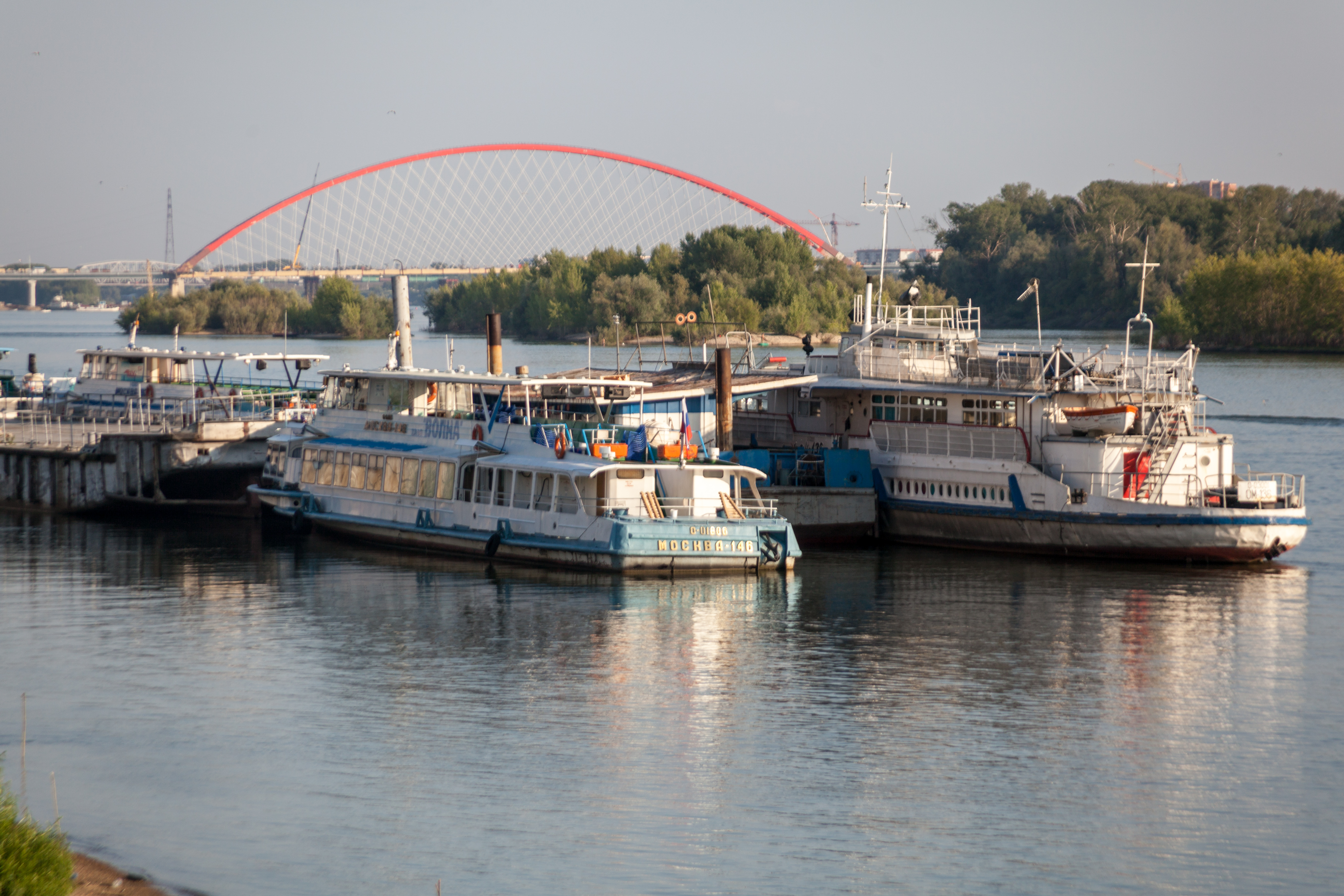

=== Bus and trolleybus ===
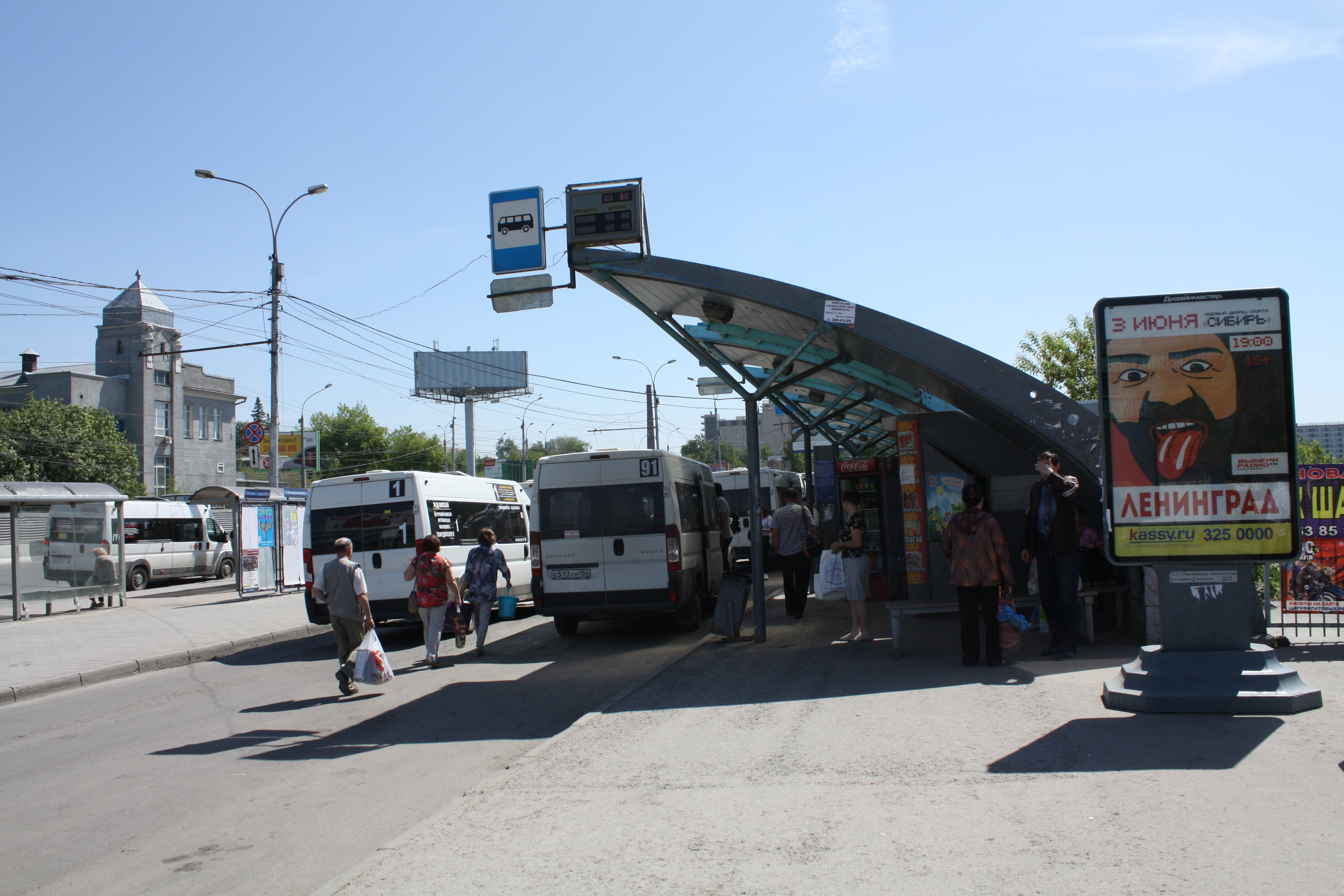
Bus stop on Bolshevistskaya Street

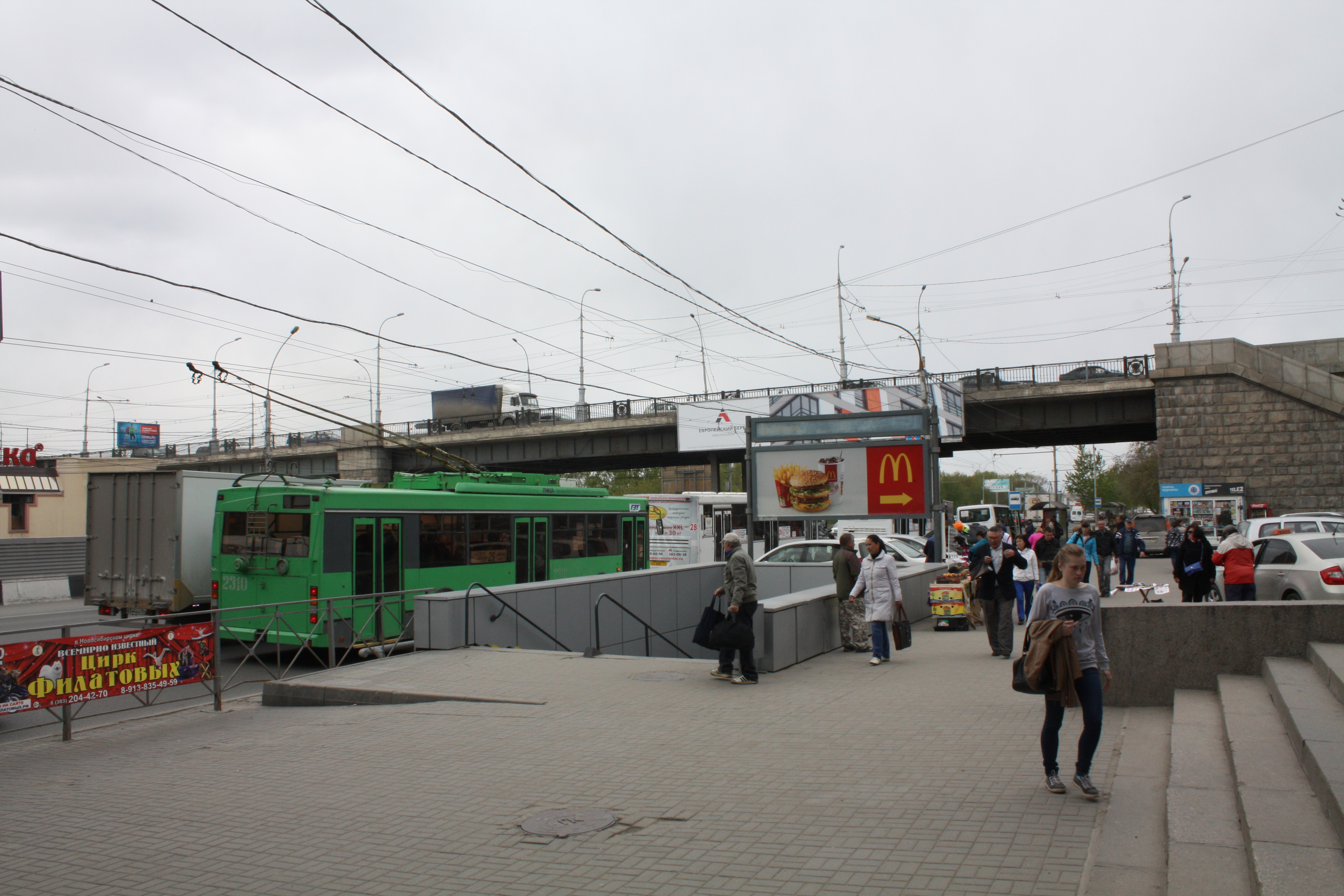

=== Tram ===
12 tram stops are located in the district.

=== Railway ===
Four railway stations are located in the district: Rechnoy Vokzal, Novosibirsk-Yuzhny, Instrumentalny, Kamyshenskaya.

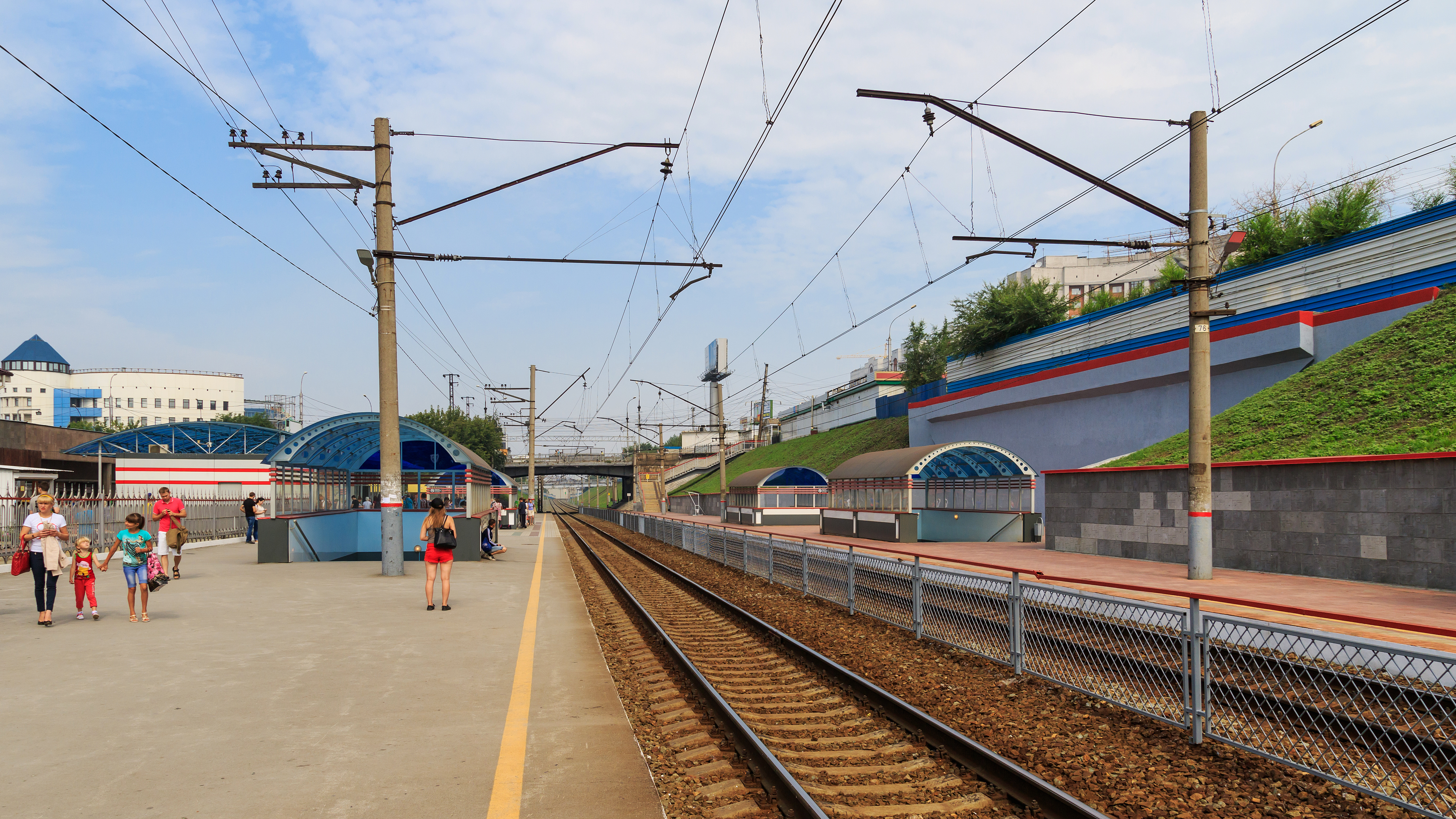
Rechnoy Vokzal Railway Station

=== Metro ===
Three Novosibirsk Metro stations are located in the district: Rechnoy Vokzal, Oktyabrskaya, Zolotaya Niva.

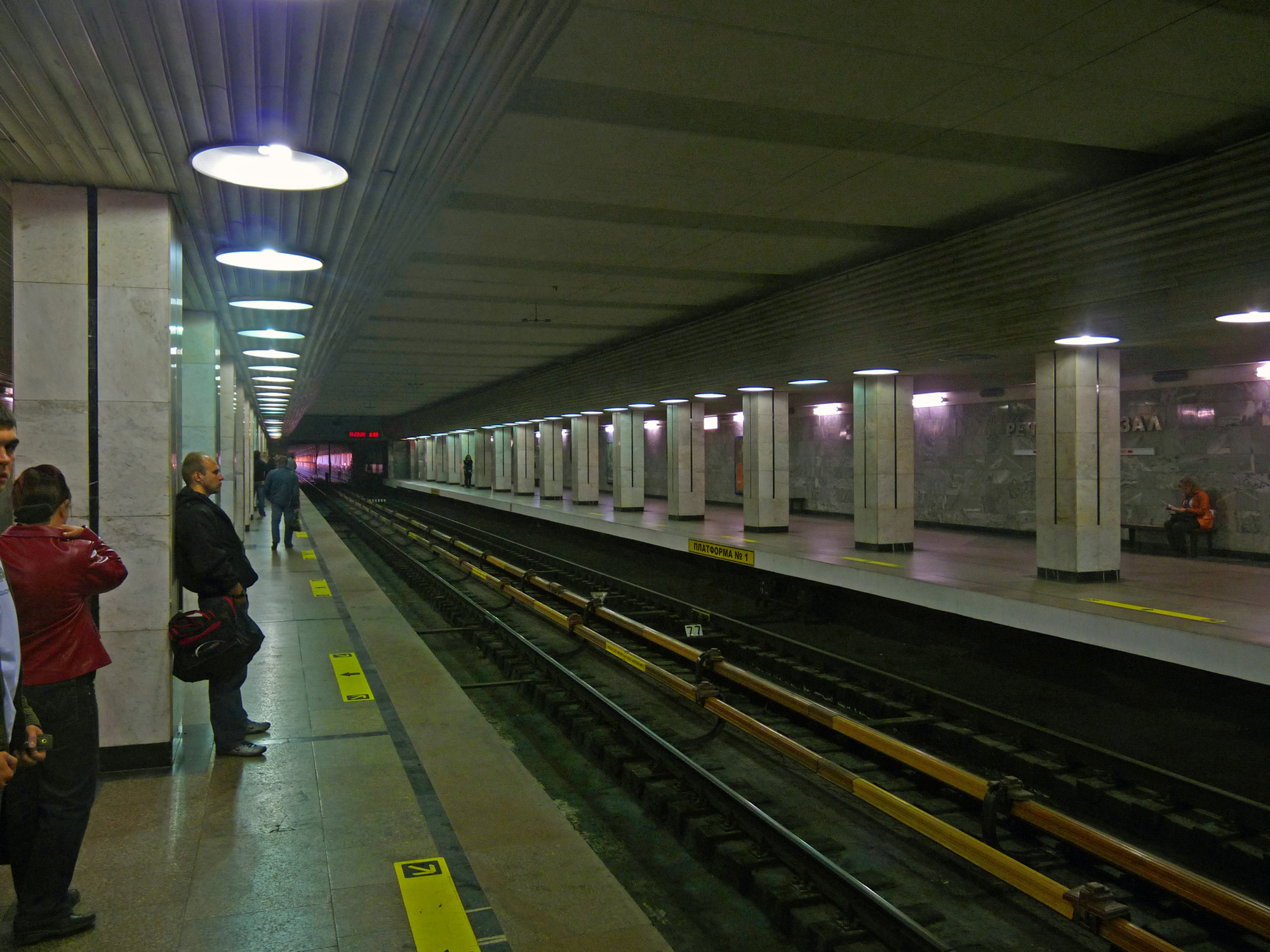
Rechnoy Vokzal

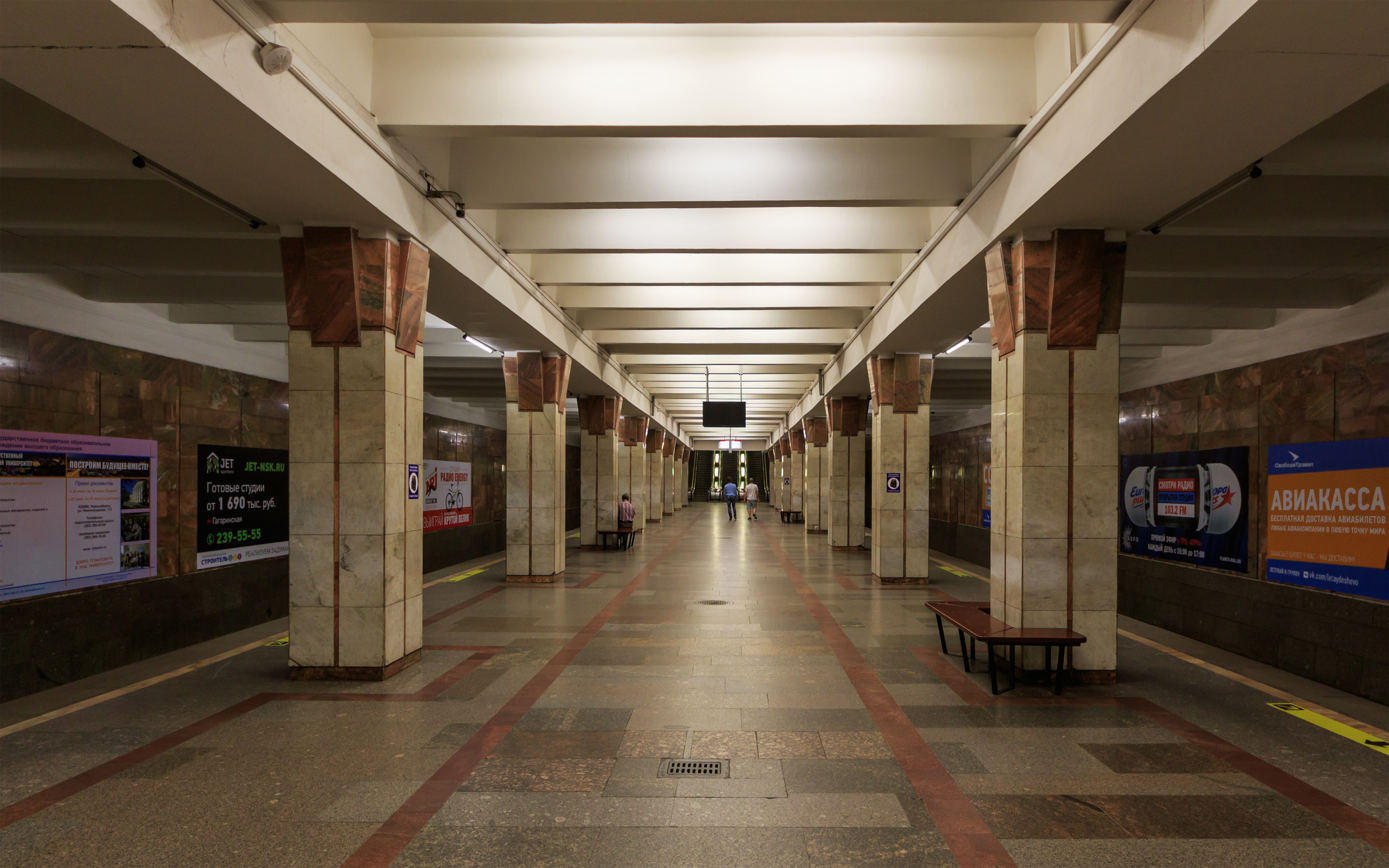
Oktyabrskaya=
