= Novosibirsk Chemical Engineering Technical School =

Russian chemical engineering school

Novosibirsk Chemical Engineering Technical School named after D. I. Mendeleev
- Новосибирский химико-технологический колледж имени Д. И. Менделеева
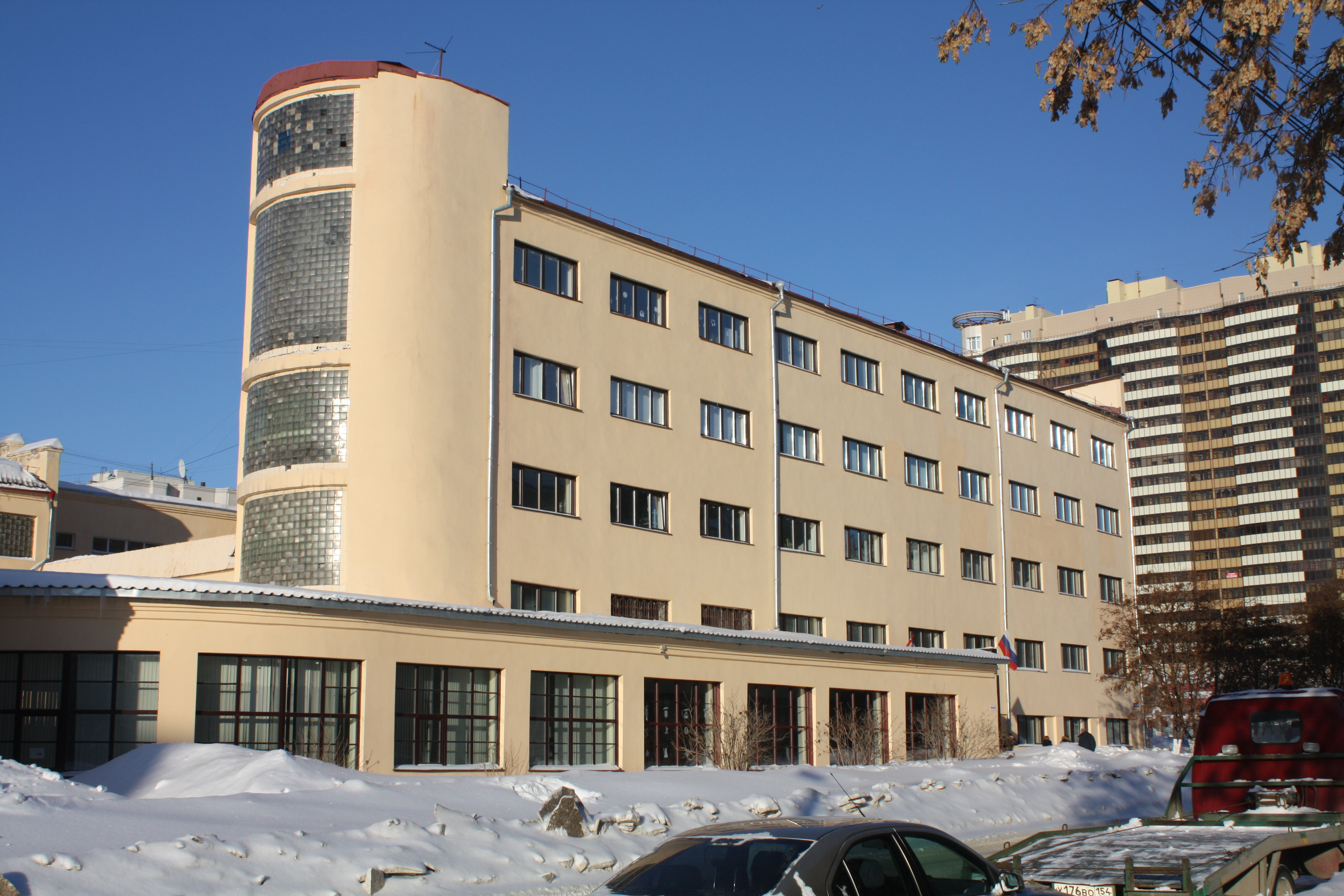

General information
- Architectural style: constructivism
- Location: Sadovaya Street 26, Novosibirsk, Russia

Novosibirsk Chemical Engineering Technical School named after D. I. Mendeleev (Russian: Новосибирский химико-технологический колледж имени Д. И. Менделеева) is an educational institution founded in 1929. The school is located between Nizhegorodskaya, Sacco and Vanzetti and Sadovaya streets in Oktyabrsky City District of Novosibirsk, Russia.

== History ==
The school was founded in 1929. In 1932, a constructivist building was built for the school.

== See also ==
- Polyclinic No. 1
- Rabochaya Pyatiletka
