= Inskaya Street, Novosibirsk =

Street in Novosibirsk, Russia

Inskaya Street
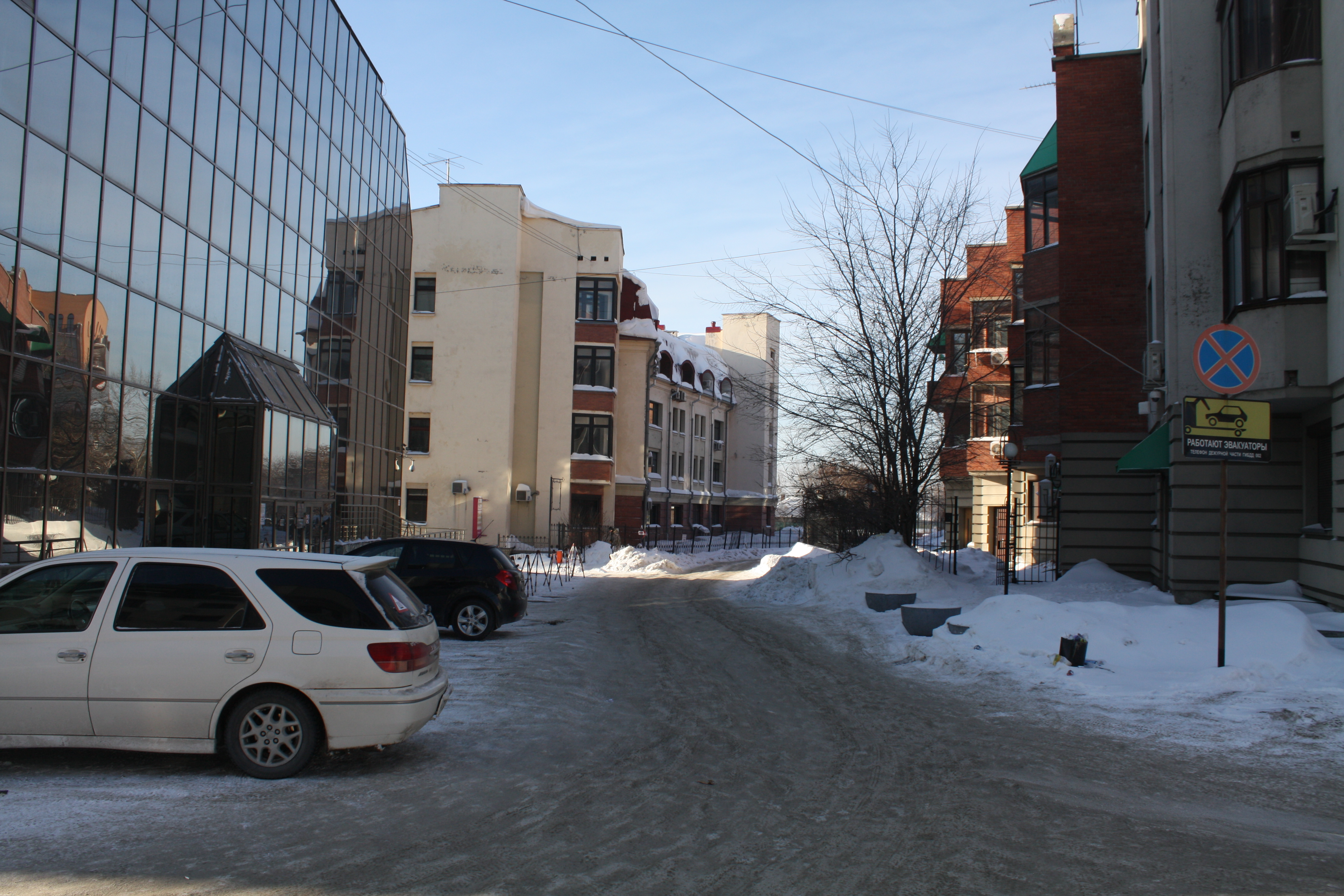
- Native name: Инская улица (Russian)
- Location: Novosibirsk; Russia

Inskaya Street (Russian: Инская улица) is a street in Oktyabrsky City District of Novosibirsk, Russia. It consists of two fragments. The first fragment starts from Ippodromskaya Street and runs southeast, then the street is interrupted by Kommunalny Bridge. The second street fragment starts from the T-intersection with Bogatkov Street, crosses Guryevskaya Street and forms the T-shaped intersection with Dobrolyubov Street.

== History ==
In tsarist times, Inskaya Street was lined with illegal brothels.

In the mid-1950s, the street was divided by Kommunalny Bridge.

== Architecture ==
- House of District Committee is a building built in 1908.
- House of Terentyevs is a building built in 1909.
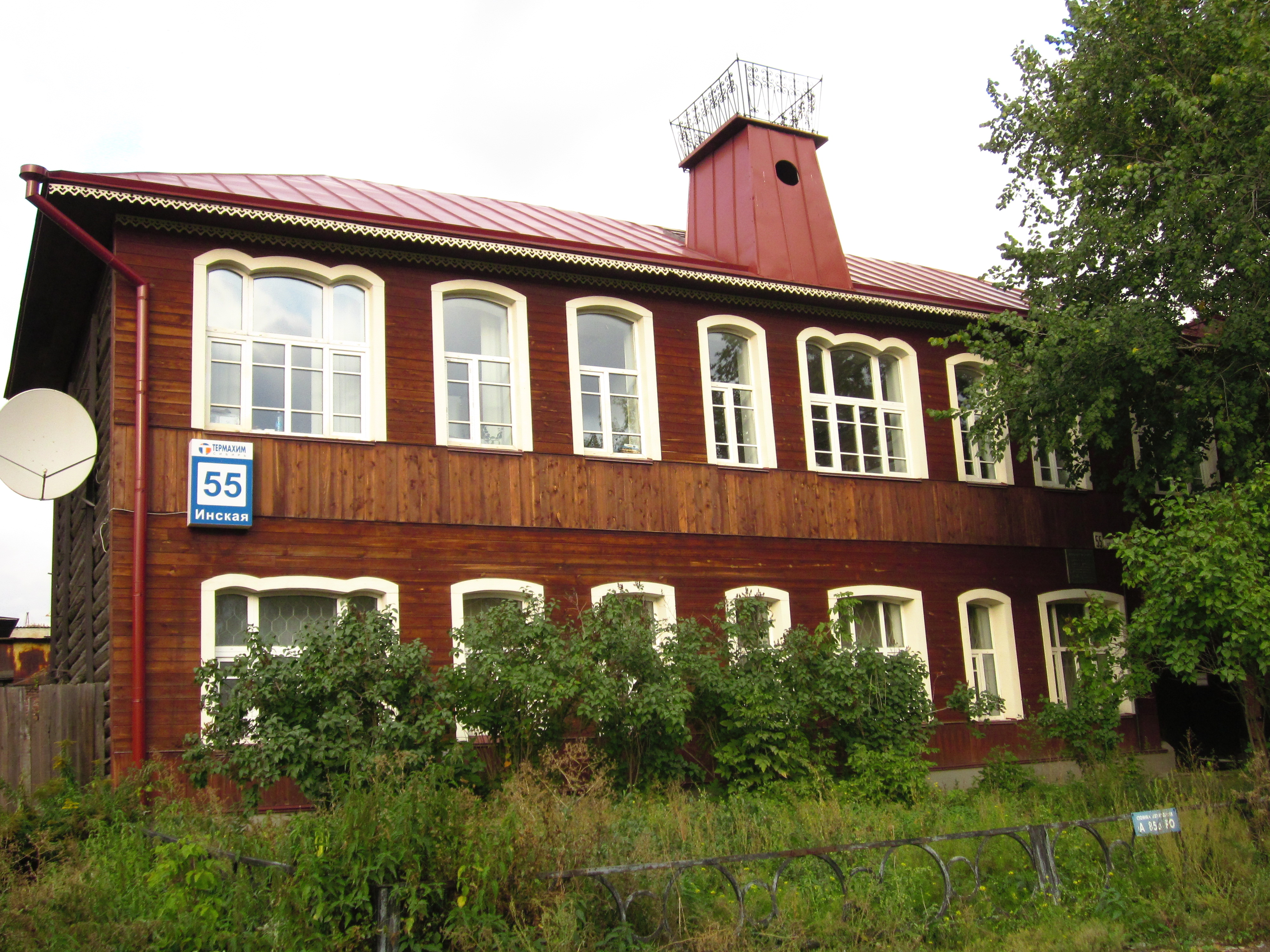
House of District Committee

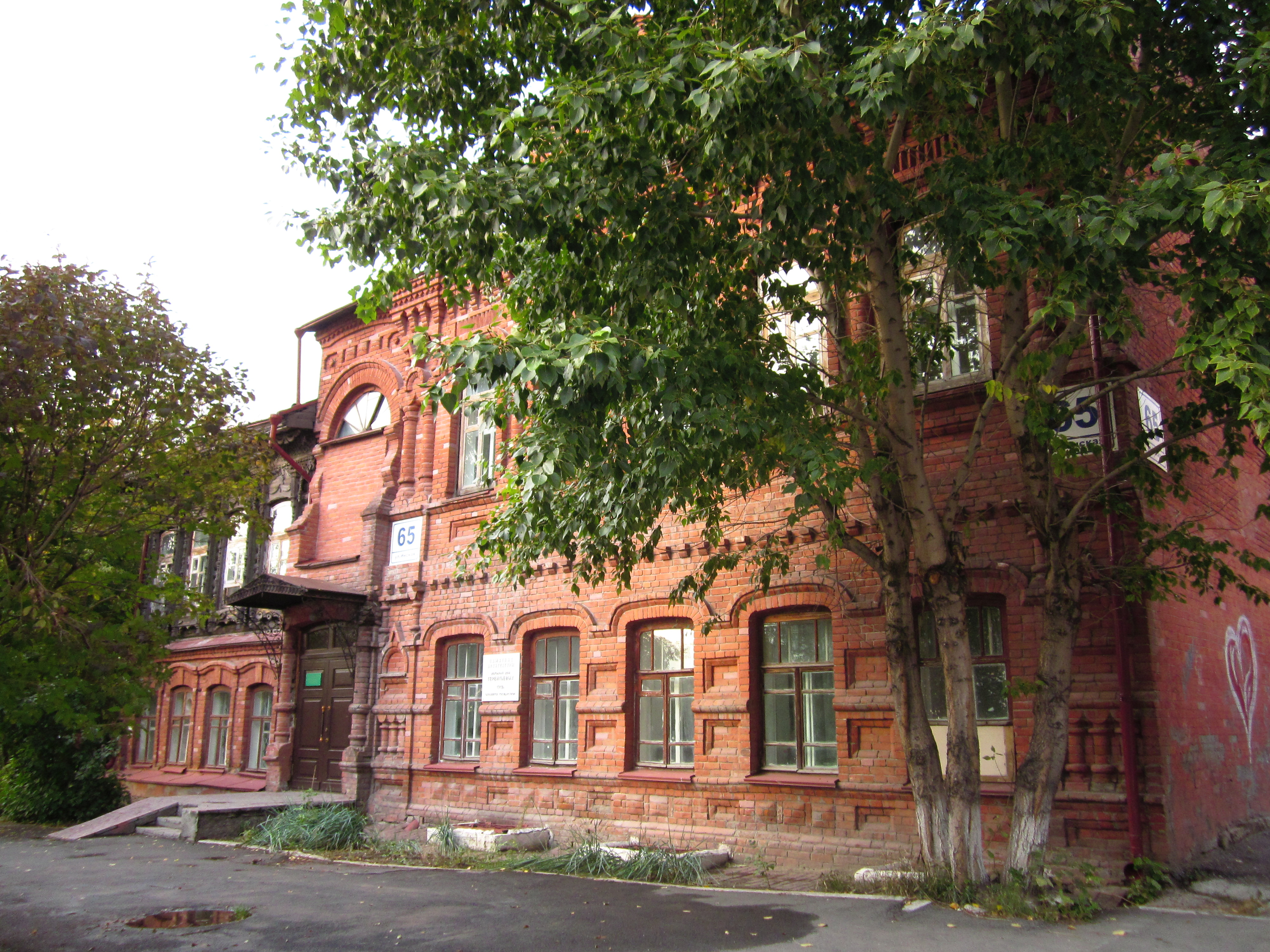
House of Terentyevs

== In literature ==
The street is mentioned in "Horse Thief and High School Girl" by Novosibirsk writer Mikhail Shchukin.
