= Novosibirsk Chocolate Factory =

Factory in Novosibirsk, Russia

- Founded: 1942
- Headquarters: Novosibirsk, Russia
- Products: chocolate, marmalade, zefir
- Website: www.uniconf.ru

Novosibirsk Chocolate Factory is a factory in Oktyabrsky District of Novosibirsk. It was founded in 1942. The factory is part of the United Confectioners Holding.

== History ==
The factory was created on the basis of evacuated department of Odessa Confectionery Factory in 1942. The construction of the factory was mainly carried out by women, future factory workers, who later mastered the confectionery specialty.

On November 7, 1942, the factory released its first trial products. From the first days of operation, the new enterprise begins to produce cocoa powder with sugar and chocolate bars for military pilots. In the first year, the factory produced up to 30 tons of chocolate products per month, it employed 78 people.

The range of factory products in 1943 consisted of tiled and figured chocolate, soft fondant and shaped glazed candies, chocolate powder and several varieties of semi-finished products.

In 1944 the second stage was launched, after which the factory launched the production of more labor-intensive products, four varieties of chocolate and chocolate semi-finished products (chocolate glaze, grated cocoa and cocoa butter) appeared in the assortment.

== Products ==
The factory produces chocolates, chocolate sets, marmalade and zefir (more than 80 kinds of products). In total, the factory produces more than 80 types of confectionery products. The most famous of them are chocolates "Novosibirskiye", "Kostyor", "Centr Derzhavy", "Bird's milk", "Mishka Kosolapy", "Romashka", "Lastochka — vestnitsa vesny", Buri Vestnik", "Sibirsky souvenir".

== Net profit ==
- 2016 – 17,4 million rubles
- 2017 – 90,8 million rubles

== Bibliography ==
- Ламин В. А. (2003). Энциклопедия. Новосибирск. Новосибирск: Новосибирское книжное издательство. p. 981. ISBN 5-7620-0968-8.
