= Novosibirsk Refinery Plant =

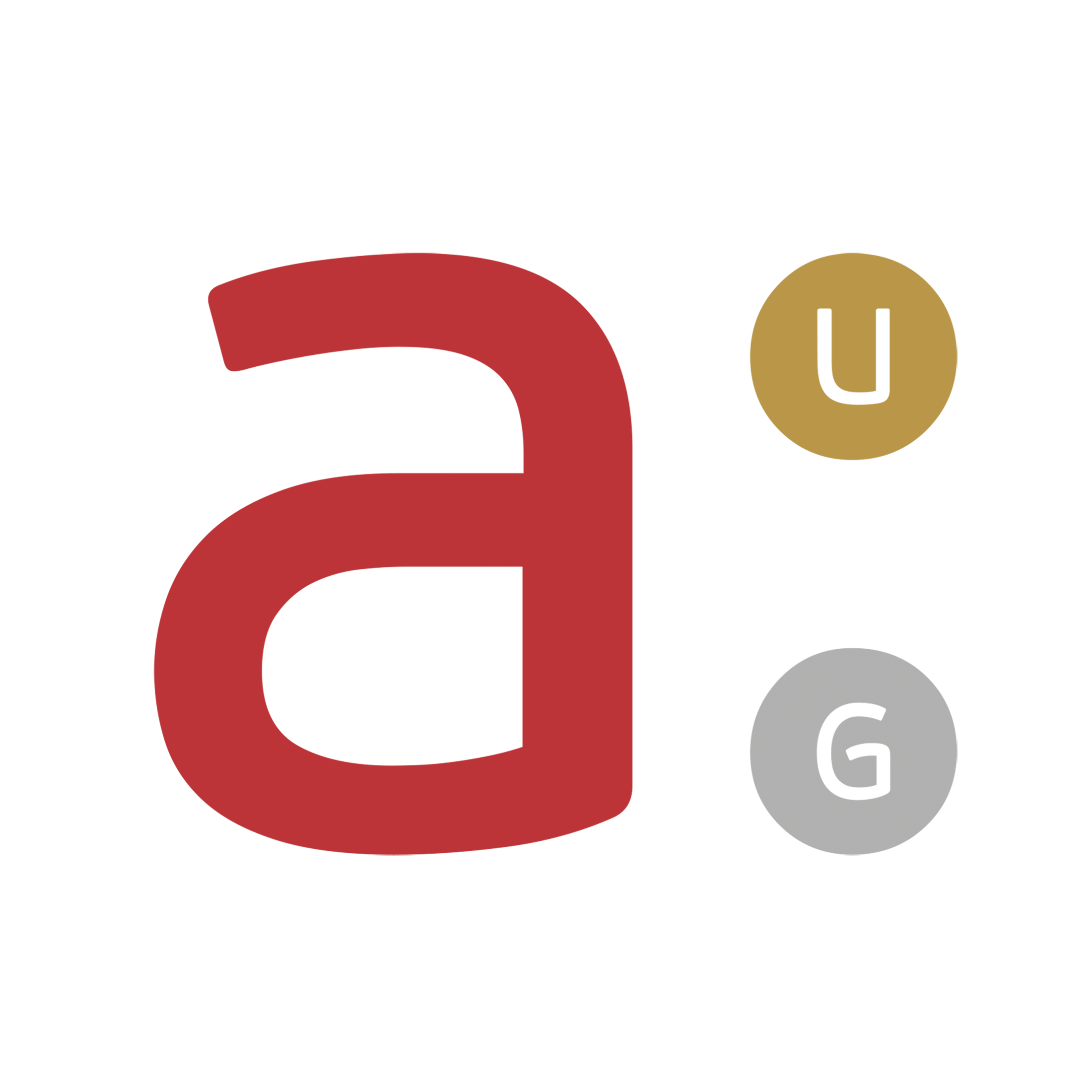
- Founded: 1941
- Headquarters: Novosibirsk, Russia
- Products: products of gold, silver, platinum and other precious metals
- Website: affinaz.ru

Novosibirsk Refinery Plant or OJSC Novosibirsk Refinery is a plant that produces products of gold, silver, platinum and other precious metals. It was established in 1926 in Moscow. Since 1941, the plant is located in Oktyabrsky District of Novosibirsk, Russia.

== History ==
In 1941, the plant was moved to Novosibirsk.

In November 1941, the plant produced its first products.

== Products ==
The Plant produces bullion, granules, powders of precious metals (gold, silver, platinum etc.).

== LBMA Certificates ==
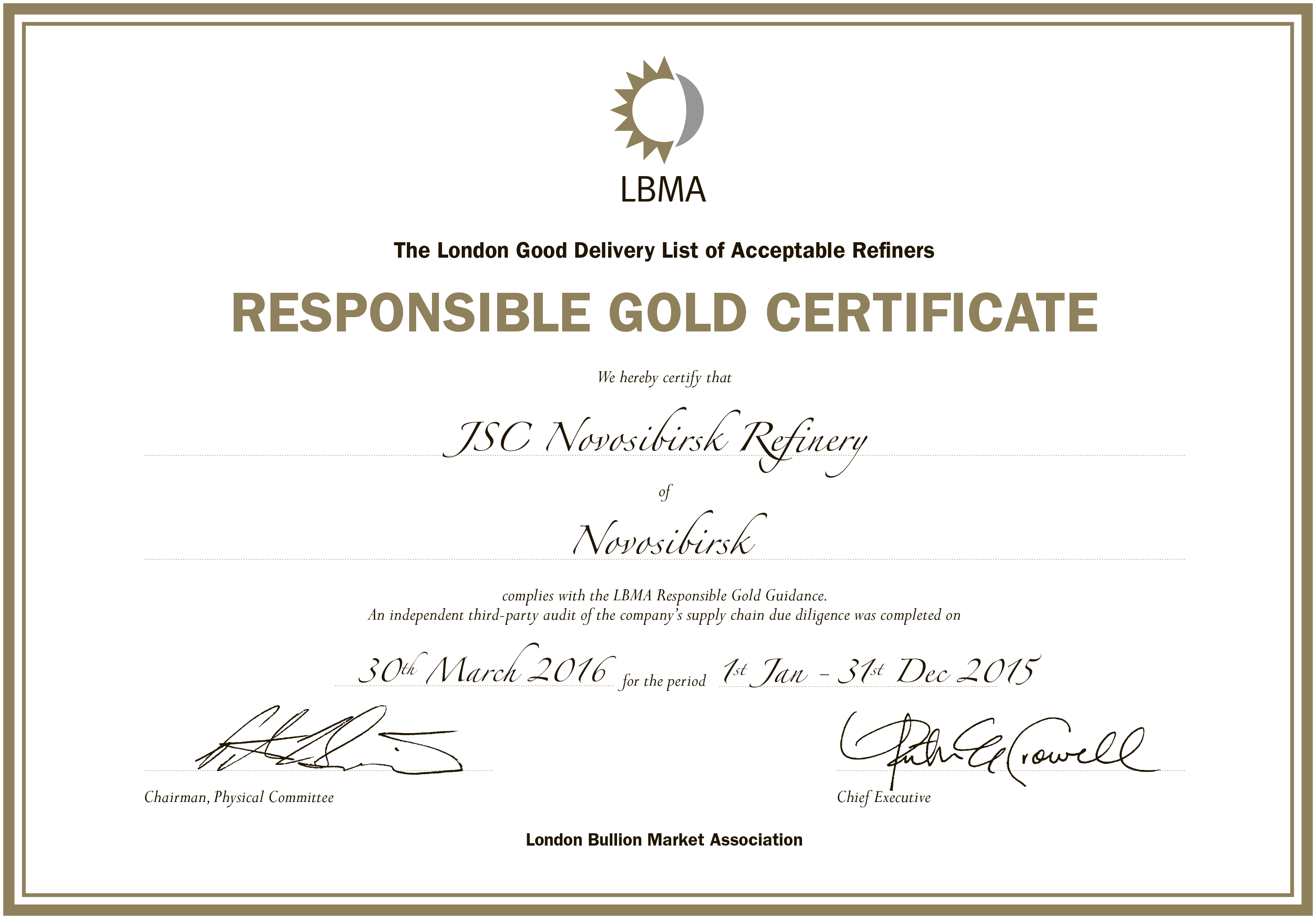
LBMA Responsible Gold Certificate

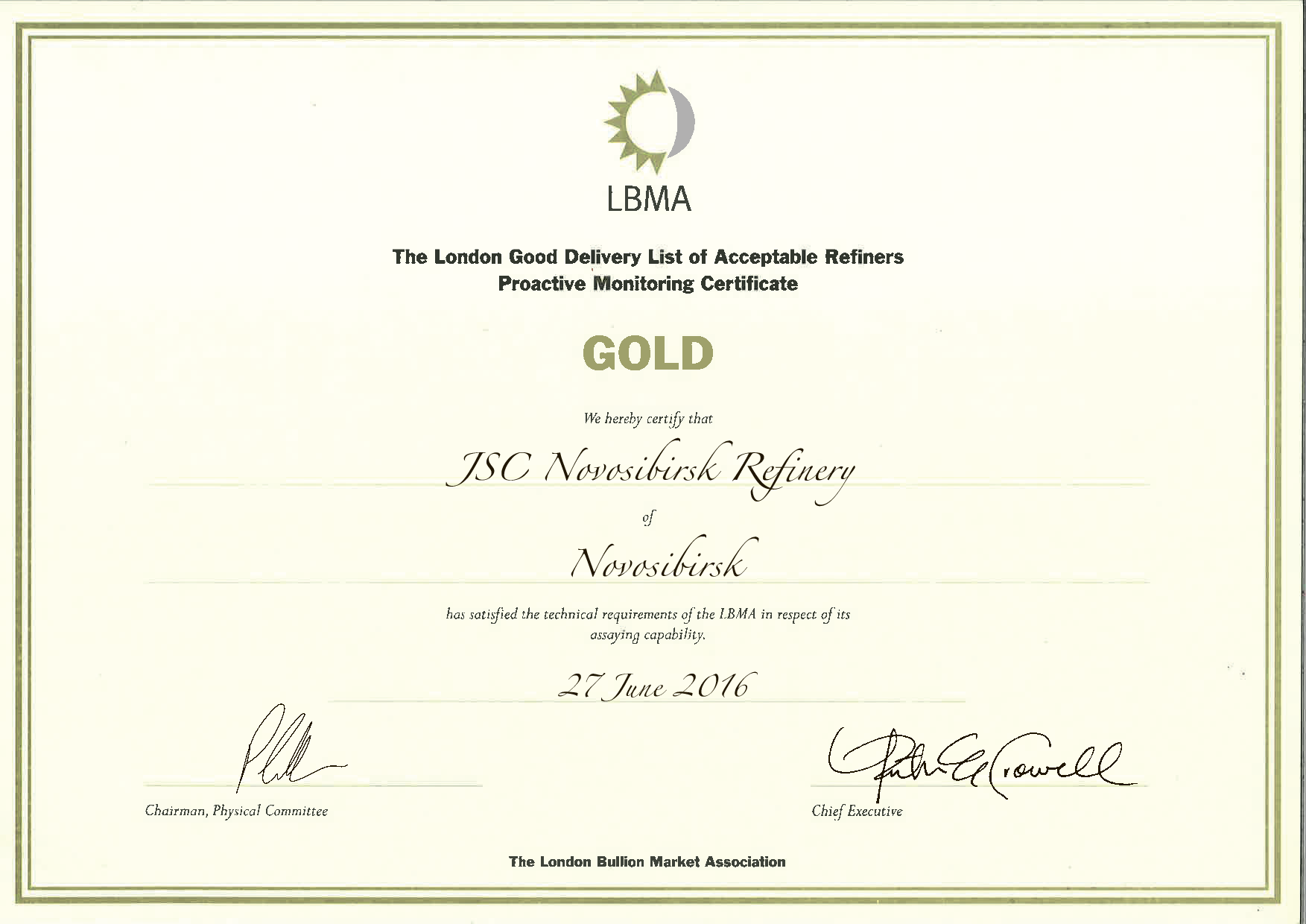
LBMA Certificate, Gold

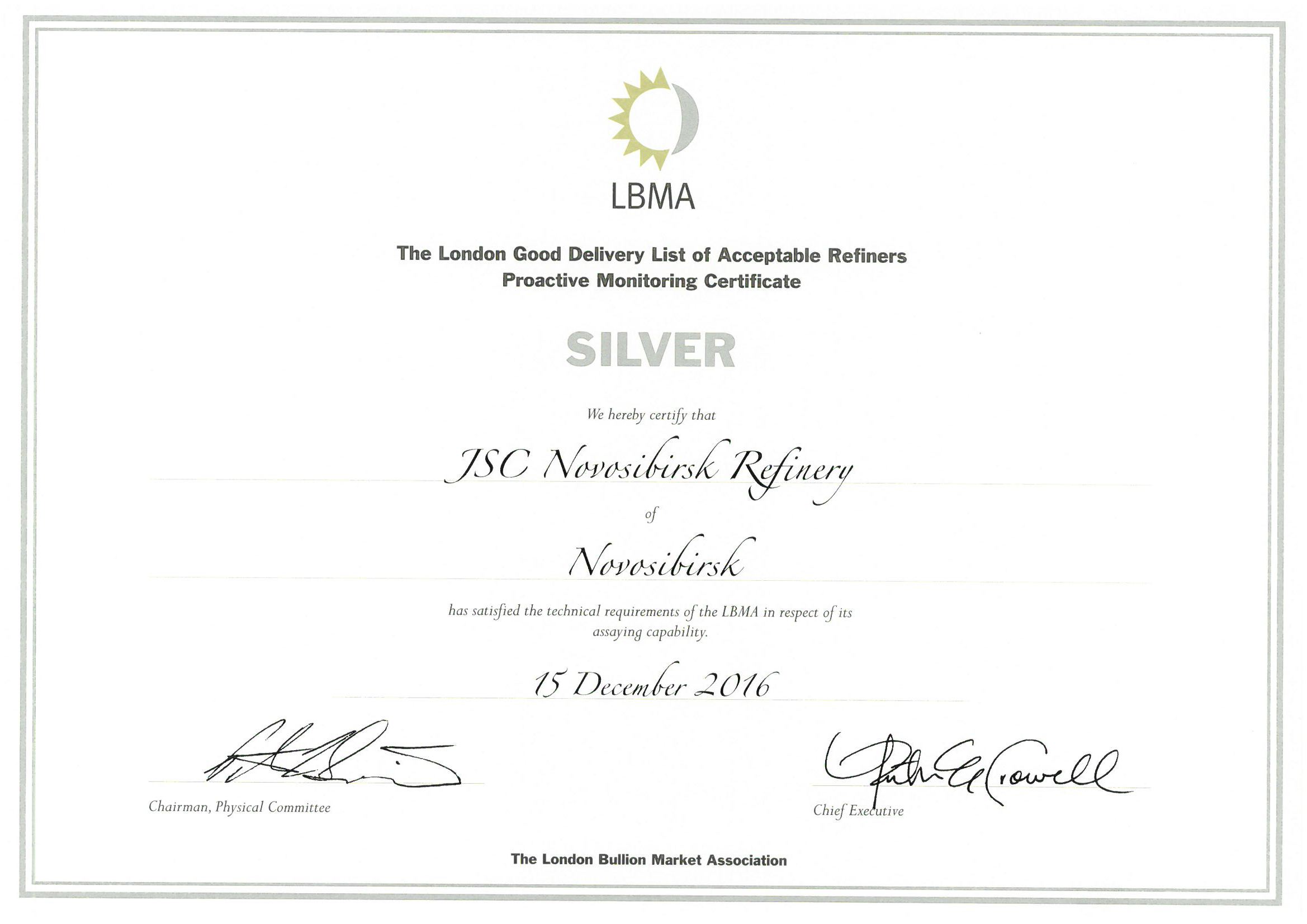
LBMA Certificate, Silver

== Bibliography ==
- Ламин В. А. (2003). Энциклопедия. Новосибирск. Новосибирск: Новосибирское книжное издательство. pp. 323–324. ISBN 5-7620-0968-8.
