= Novosibirsk-Yuzhny railway station =

Railway station in Novosibirsk, Russia

Novosibirsk-Yuzhny
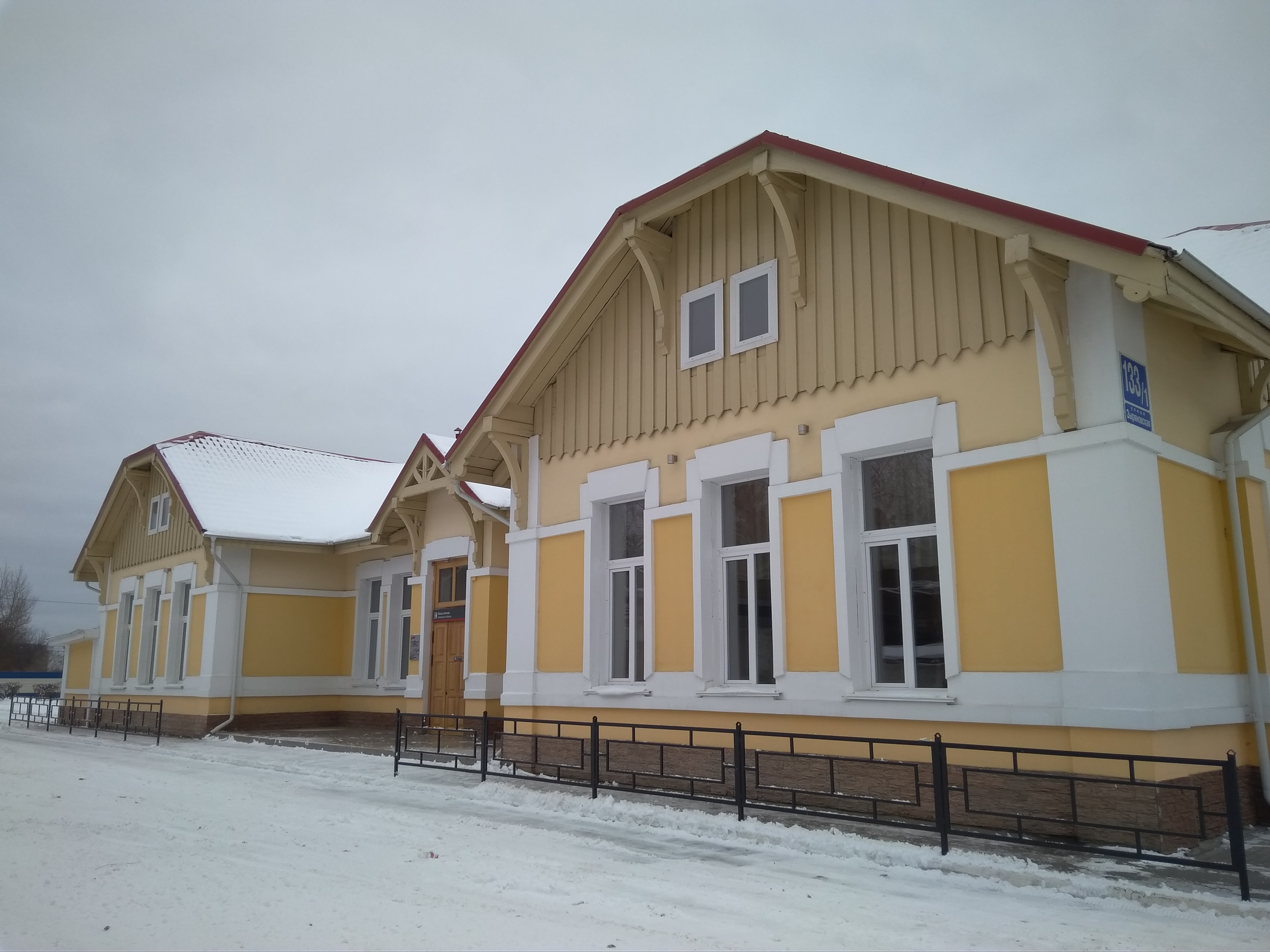

General information
- Location: Russia, Novosibirsk
- Coordinates: 55.0048°N 82.9523°E
- Owner: Russian Railways

History
- Opened: 1915
- Former names: Altaiskaya
Location

Novosibirsk-Yuzhny (Russian: Новосибирск-Южный) is a passenger railway station in Oktyabrsky District of Novosibirsk, Russia.

== History ==
The station had been under construction since 1913.

In 1915, the station was built, traffic opened between Novonikolayevsk and Biysk.

The station complex included a station building with ancillary facilities, residential buildings for families of railway workers, a school, a medical center, a water tower, a locomotive depot.

In 2015, eight objects of the station were included in the list of identified cultural heritage sites of Novosibirsk Oblast: a passenger station, four residential buildings, an administrative building, a water tower and a warehouse.

== Gallery ==
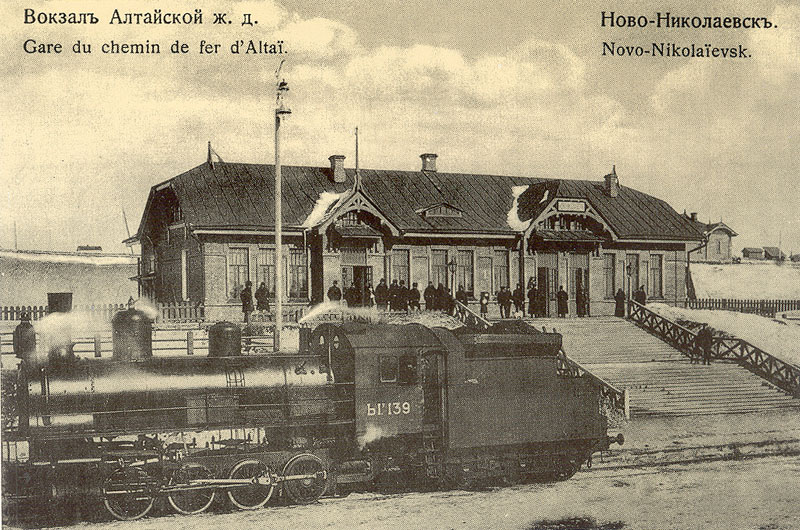
The station in the 1910s.

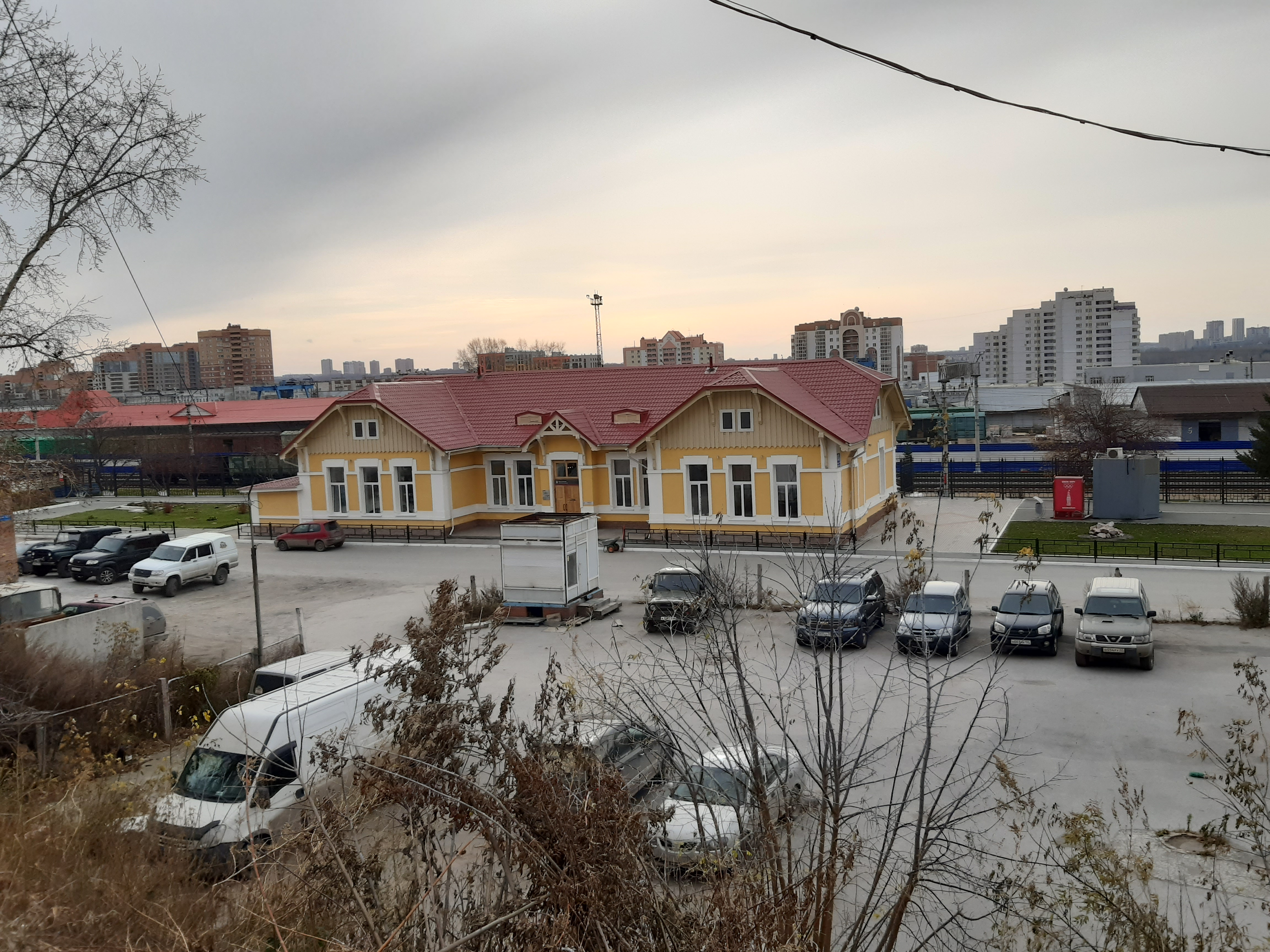
