= Novosibirsk Thermal Power Plant 5 =

Power plant in Oktyabrsky, Novosibirsk, Russia

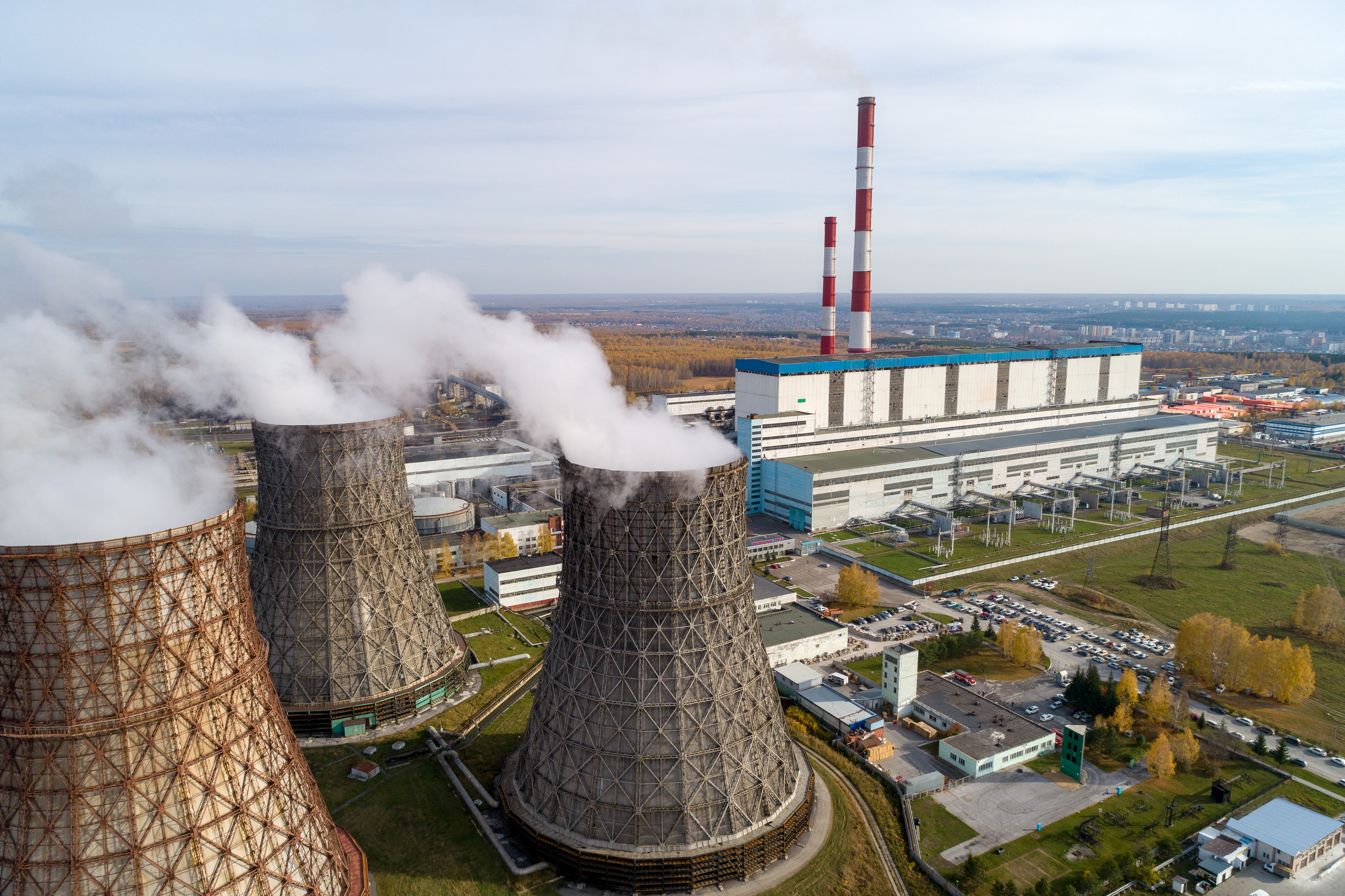
- Official name: Новосибирская ТЭЦ-5
- Country: Russia
- Location: Novosibirsk
- Coordinates: 55°01′N 83°04′E
- Status: Operational
- Commission date: 1977

Power generation
- Nameplate capacity: 1,200 MW

External links
- Commons: Related media on Commons

Novosibirsk Thermal Power Plant 5 (Russian: Новосибирская ТЭЦ-5) is a coal-fired power station in the Oktyabrsky City District of Novosibirsk. It is one of the largest thermal power stations in Russia. The decision to build the plant was taken in 1971, and it officially started operating on 28 March 1977.
