= Elektrosignal Plant =

- Company type: Open Joint Stock Company
- Founded: 1941
- Headquarters: Novosibirsk, Russia
- Website: www.electrosignal.ru

Elektrosignal Plant (Russian: Завод «Электросигнал») is a company based in Novosibirsk, Russia.

The Elektrosignal plant was moved to its current location during World War II. A producer of radio equipment for the military, it was also producing "Izumrud" television sets for the civil economy by 1966. The plant currently continues to produce television sets and also makes aircraft radio communications equipment.
