= Church of the Theotokos of the Sign, Novosibirsk =

Russian Orthodox church in Novosibirsk Oblast, Russia

Church of the Theotokos of the Sign Знаменская церковь
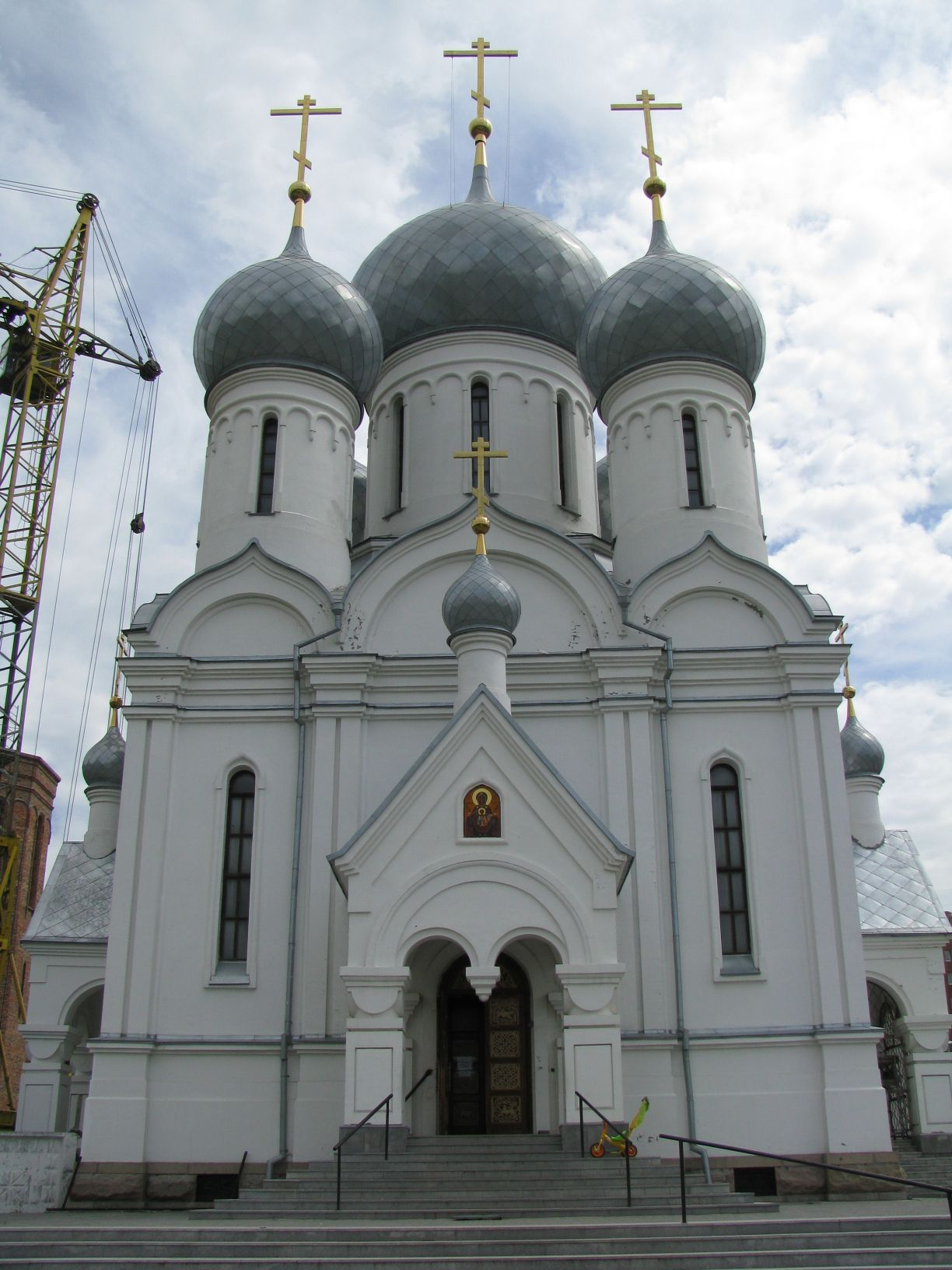

Religion
- Affiliation: Russian Orthodox

Location
- Location: Novosibirsk
- Interactive map of Church of the Theotokos of the Sign; Знаменская церковь

Architecture
- Architect: P. A. Chernobrovtsev

Church of the Theotokos of the Sign (Russian: Знаменская церковь) is a Russian Orthodox church in Kalininsky City District of Novosibirsk, Russia.

== History ==
Church of the Theotokos of the Sign was built in 1994–1998 by the architect Pyotr Chernobrovtsev.

July 25, 2000, the church was consecrated by Bishop Sergius (Sokolov).
