= Sukhoy Log (1st Yeltsovka) =

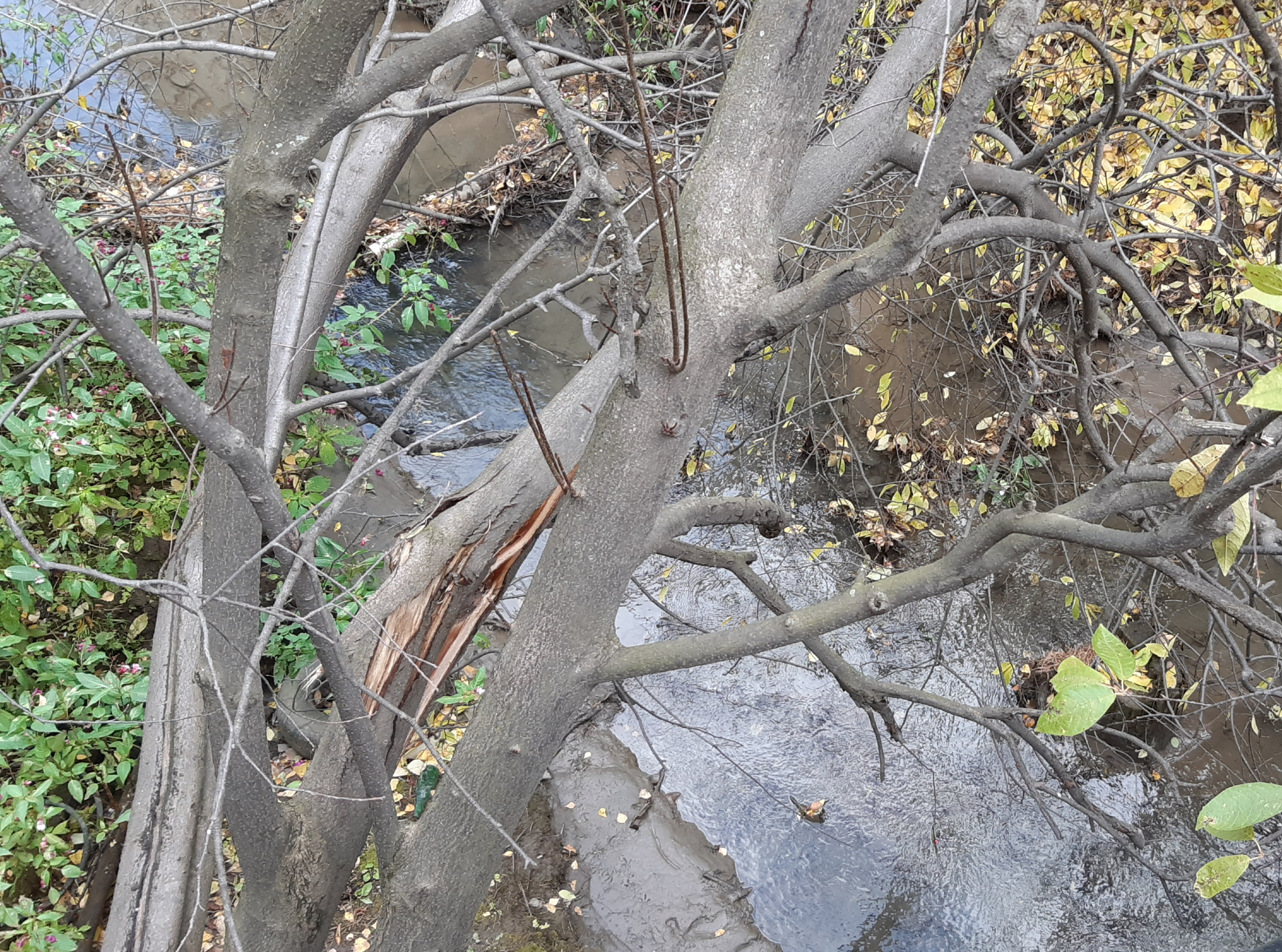
- Native name: Сухой Лог (Russian)

Location
- Country: Russia
- Region: Novosibirsk Oblast
- City: Novosibirsk
- City district: Kalininsky District

Physical characteristics
- Mouth: 1st Yeltsovka
- Length: 3–4 km (1.9–2.5 mi)

The Sukhoy Log (Russian: Сухой Лог) is a creek in Kalininsky District of Novosibirsk, Russia, a right tributary of the 1st Yeltsovka River. Its length is 3–4 km. The stream lends its name to the microdistrict and the street of the city.

== Description ==
The source of the creek is unknown. The stream probably begins within one of the industrial zones of Kalininsky District. It comes to the surface from the collector near Alexander Nevsky Street, 41.

== Flora ==
Raspberry, birch, oak trees, manchurian walnut grow near the creek.

== Bridges across the stream ==
There are seven pedestrian bridges across the Sukhoy Log, as well as a dam built in 1953.

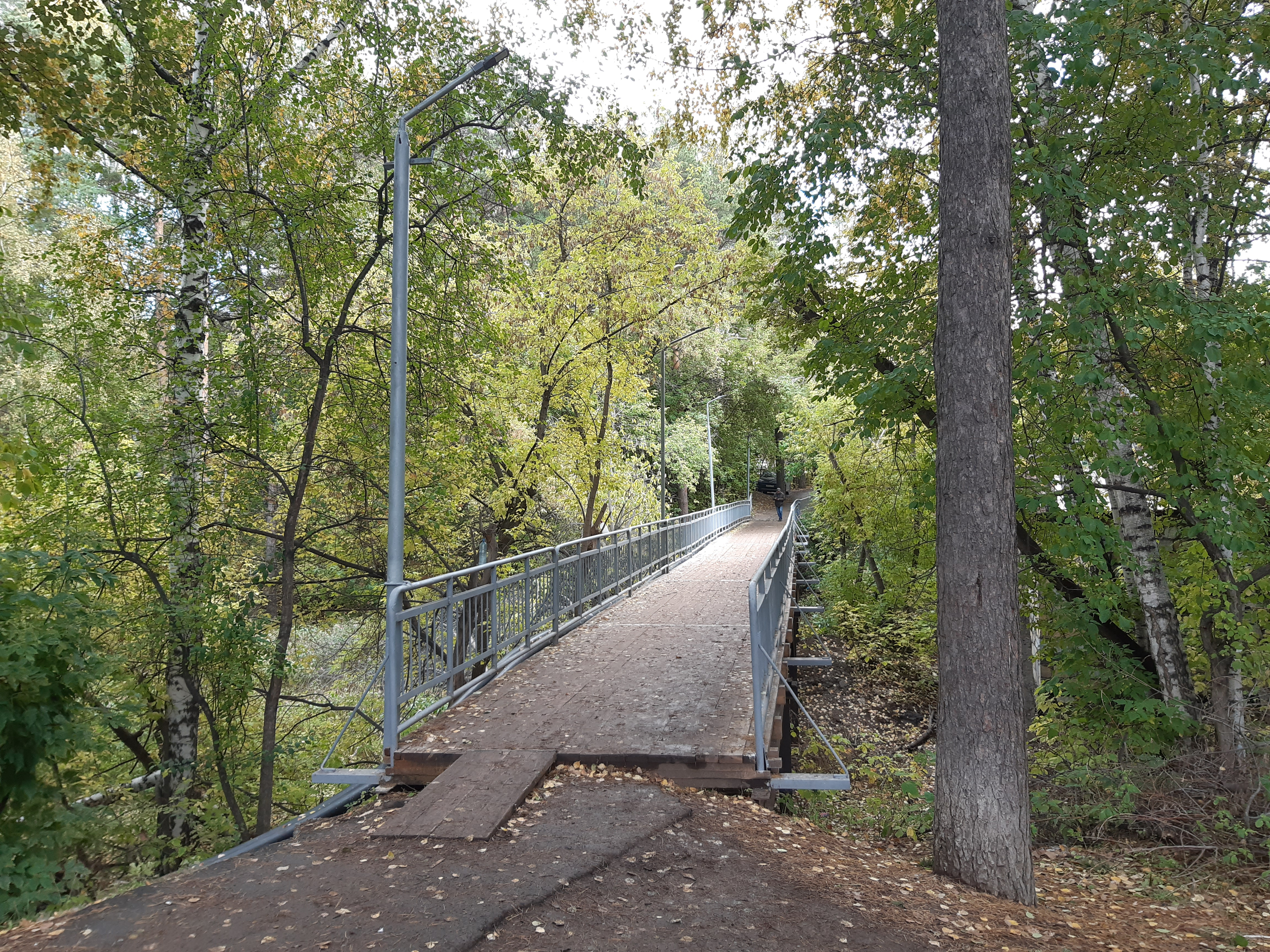

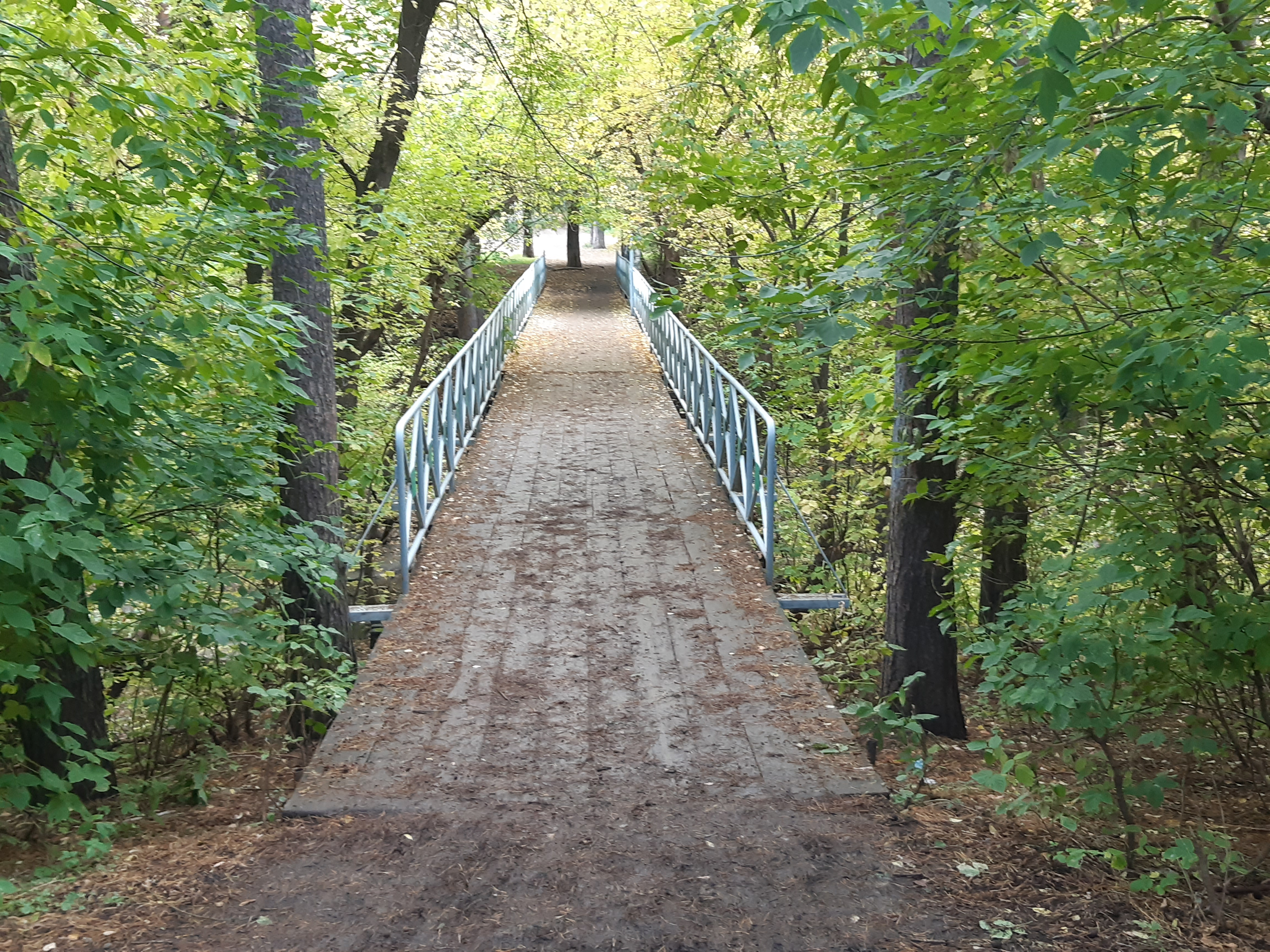
