= Palace of Culture named after Maxim Gorky, Novosibirsk =

Museum in Russia

Palace of Culture named after Maxim Gorky
- Дворец культуры имени Горького
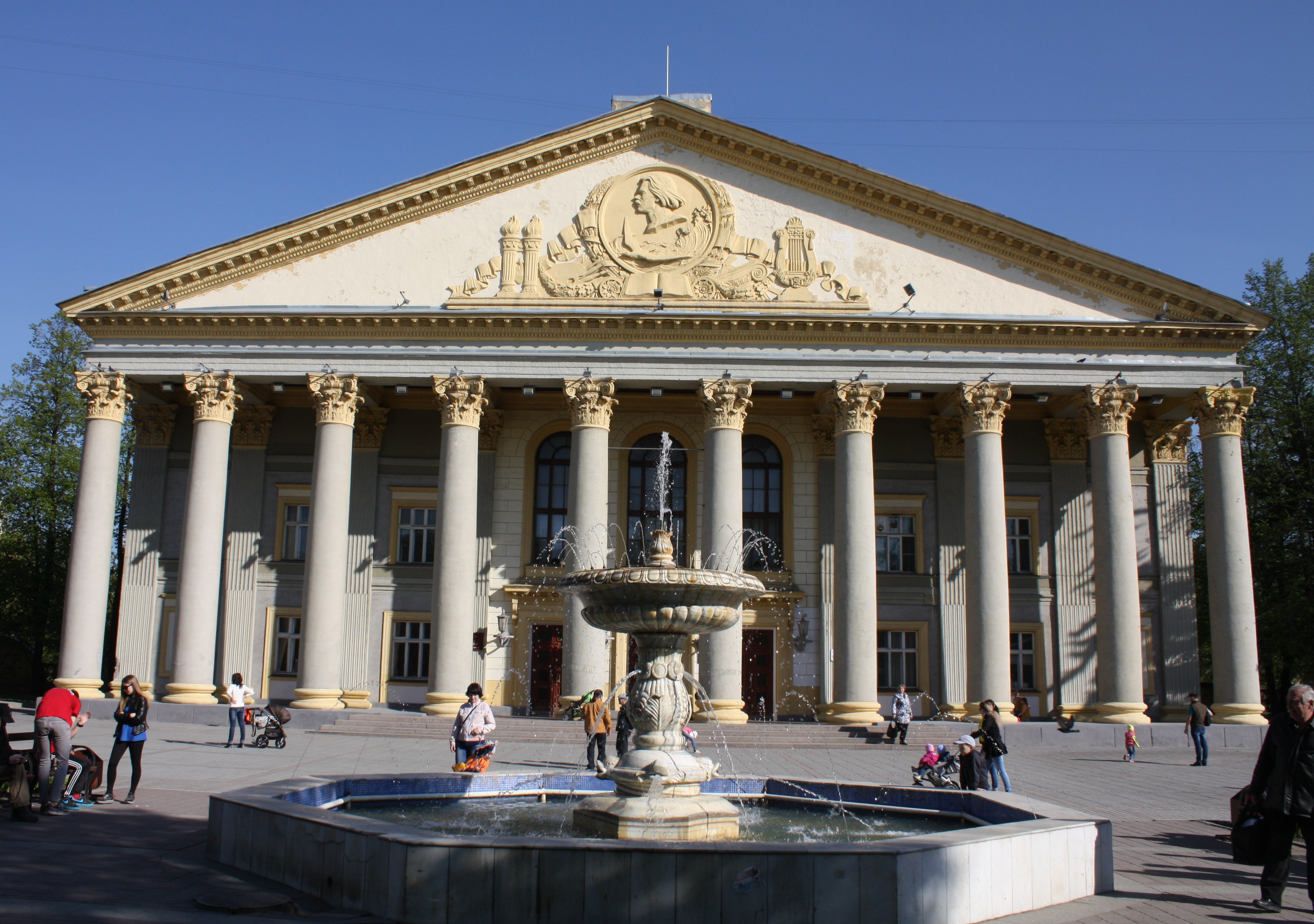
- Interactive map of the Palace of Culture named after Maxim Gorky area

General information
- Location: Bohdan Khmelnytsky Street 40, Novosibirsk, Russia
- Completed: 1957

Design and construction
- Architects: A. S. Mikhailov; V. S. Vnukov

Palace of Culture named after Maxim Gorky (Russian: Дворец культуры имени Горького) is a building in Kalininsky City District of Novosibirsk, Russia. It was built in 1957. Architect: A. S. Mikhailov, V. S. Vnukov. The building is located on Bohdan Khmelnytsky Street.

== Description ==
The building was constructed by architects A. S. Mikhailov and V. S. Vnukov in 1957. The bas-relief of the pediment was created by sculptor M. I. Mentikov.

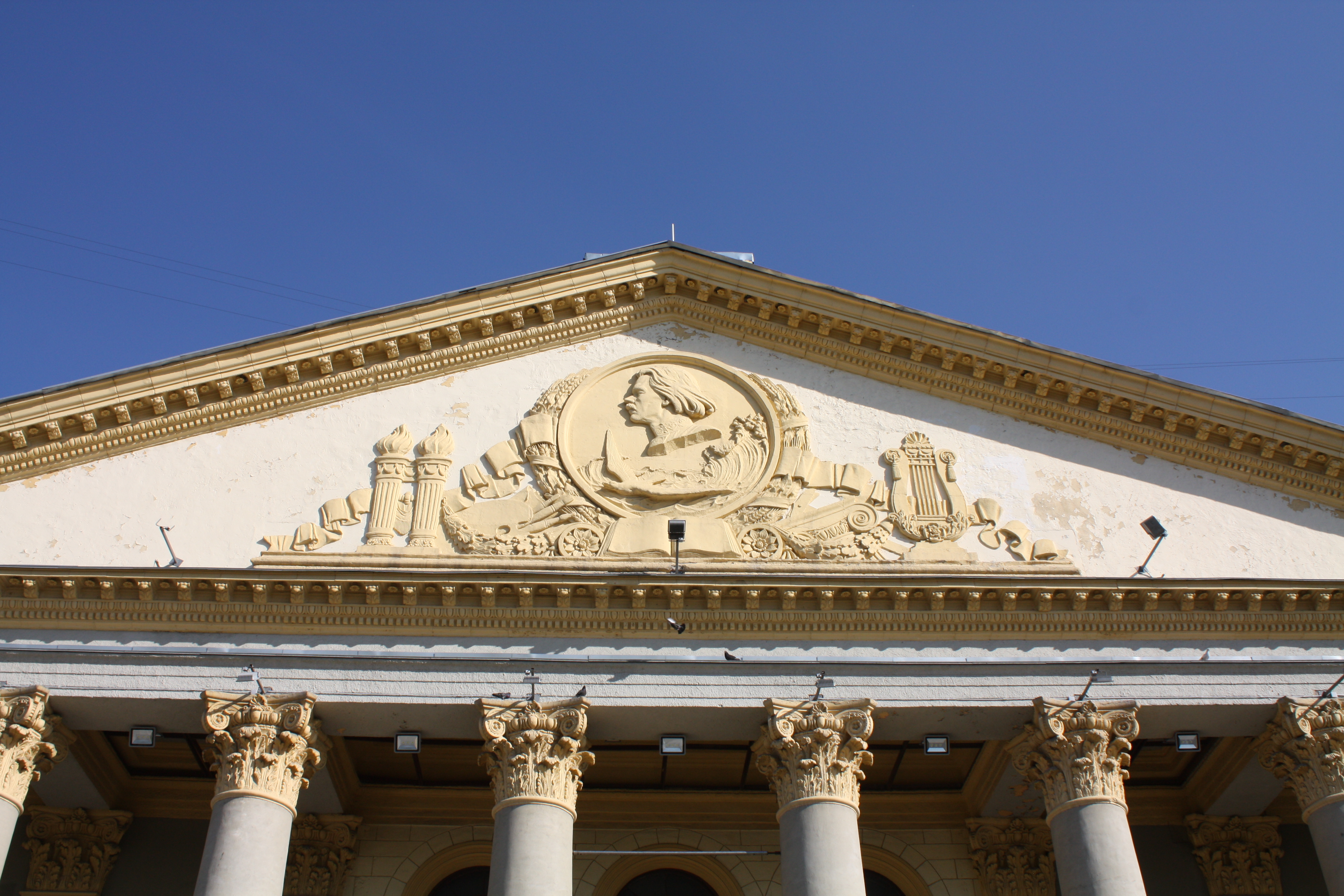

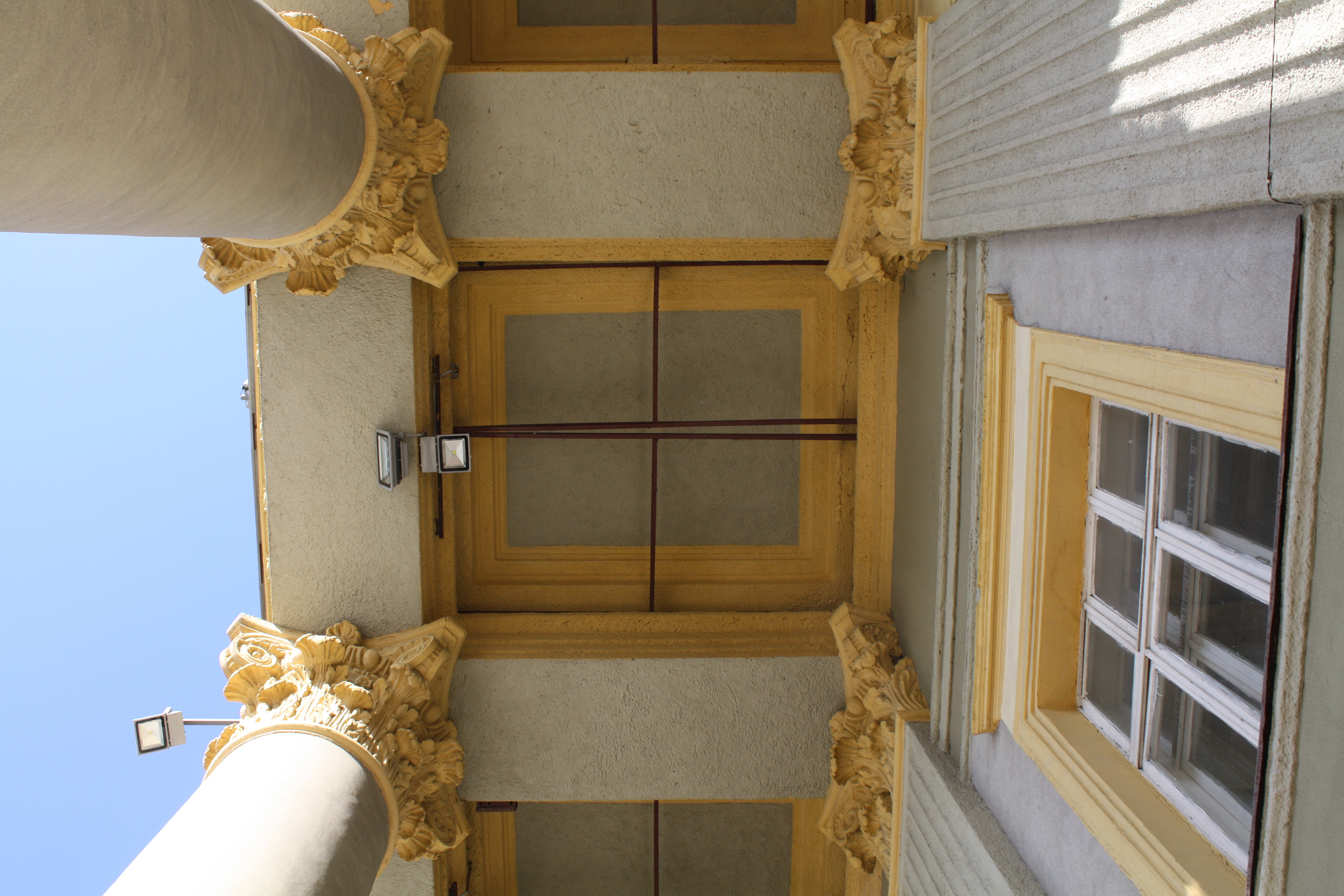

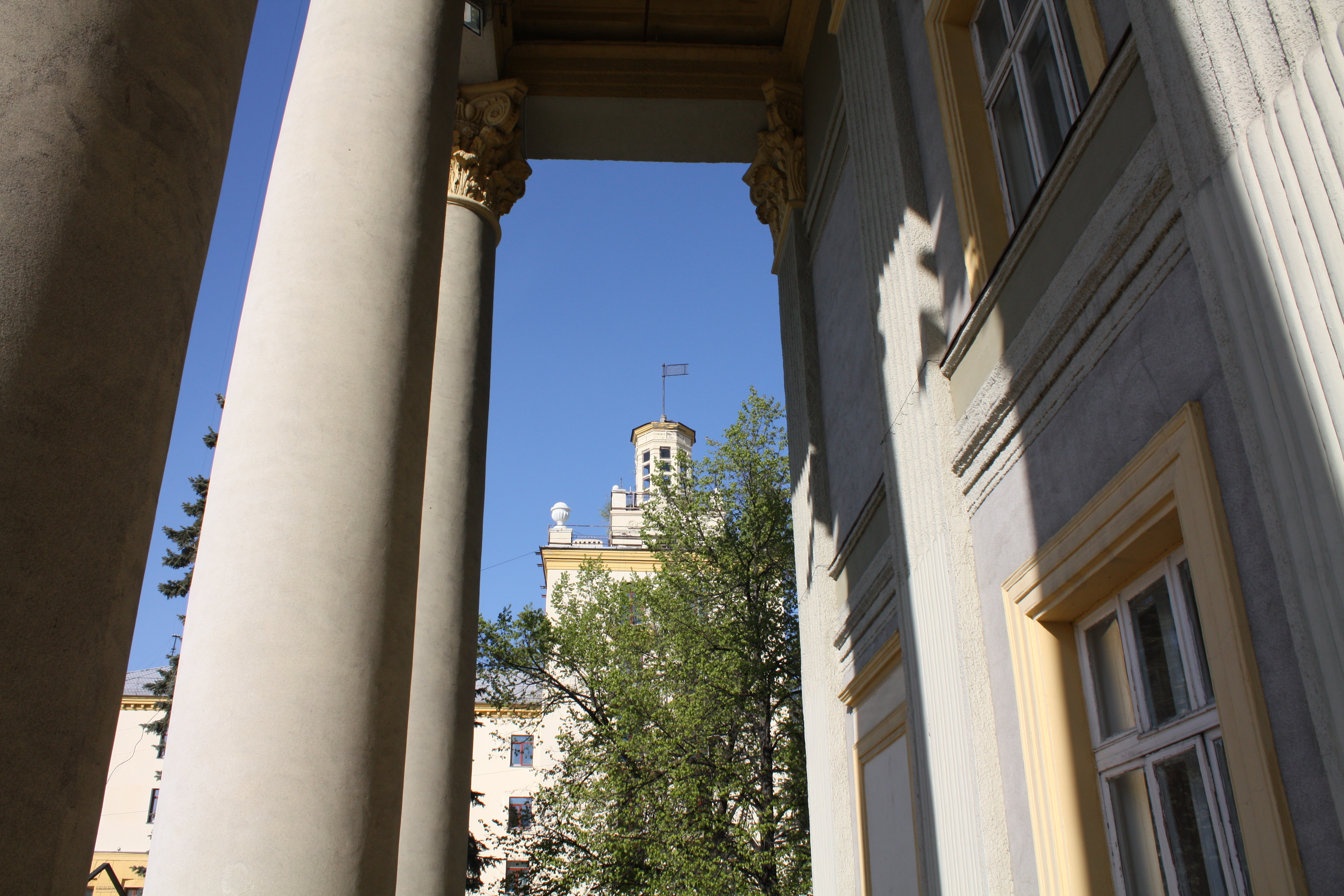

== Buildings of the architectural ensemble ==
The palace, two fountains and the surrounding buildings are single architectural ensemble. Buildings of the architectural ensemble: Bohdan Khmelnytsky Street 38 and Bohdan Khmelnytsky Street 42.

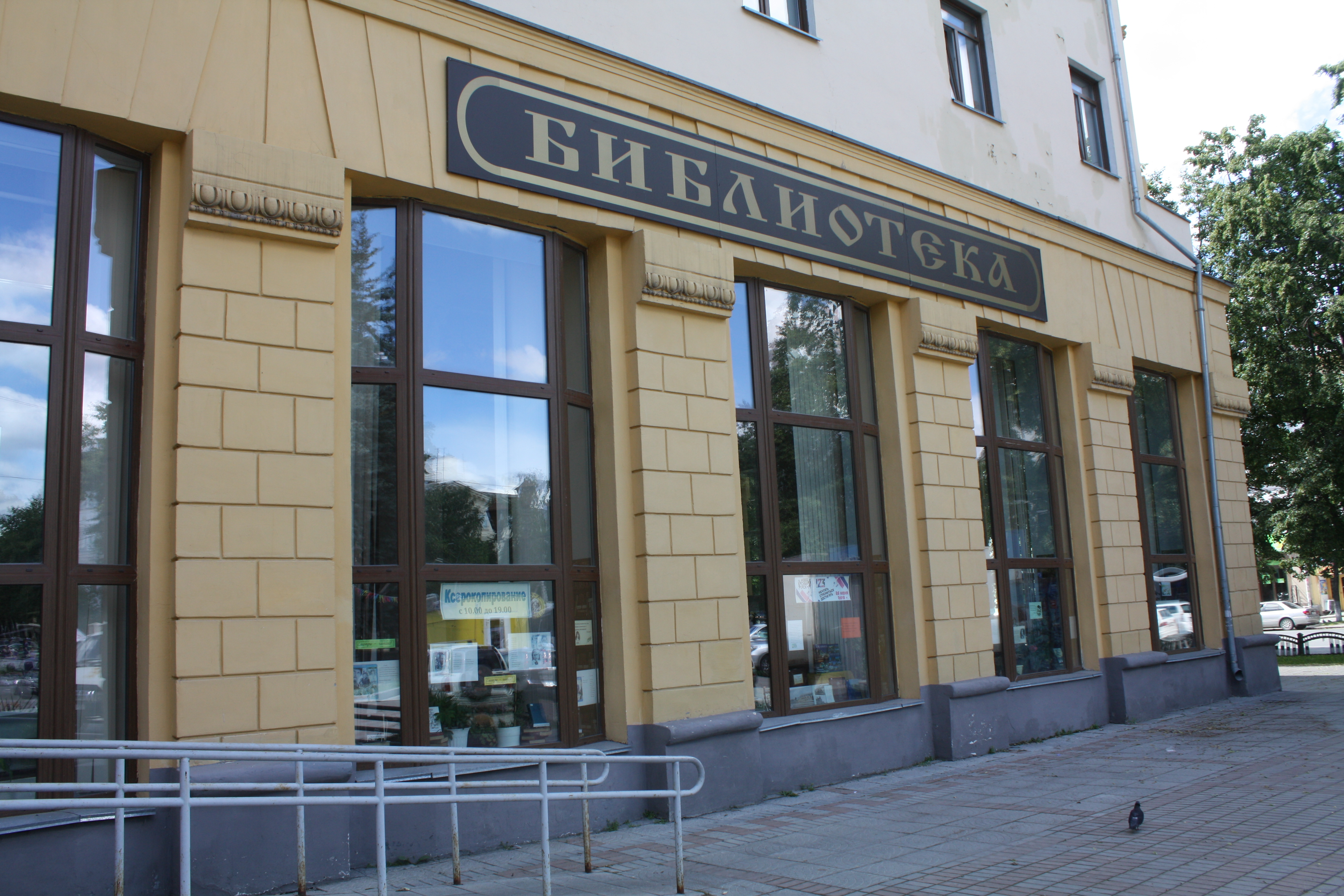
Bohdan Khmelnytsky Street 38

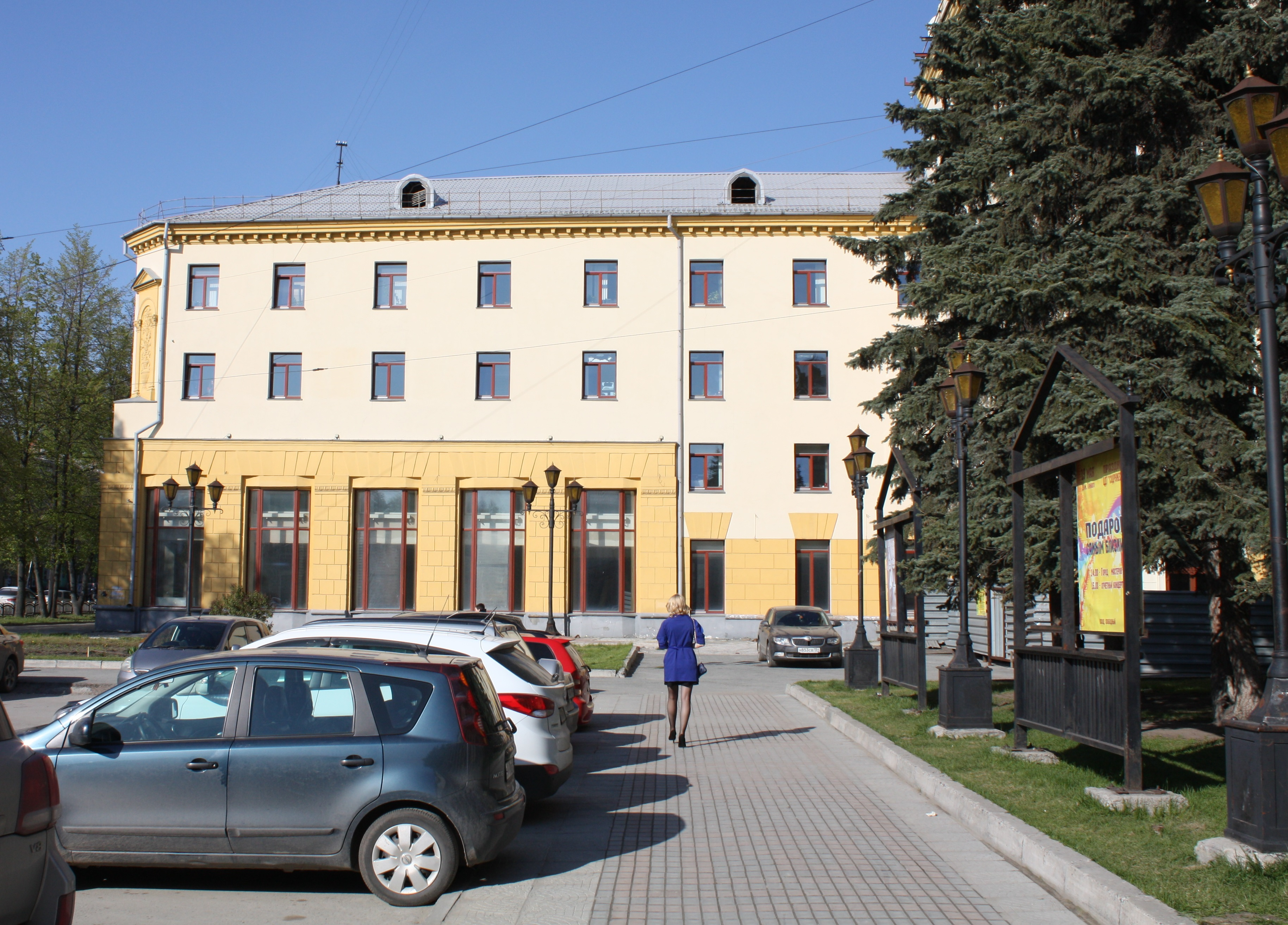
Bohdan Khmelnytsky Street 42.

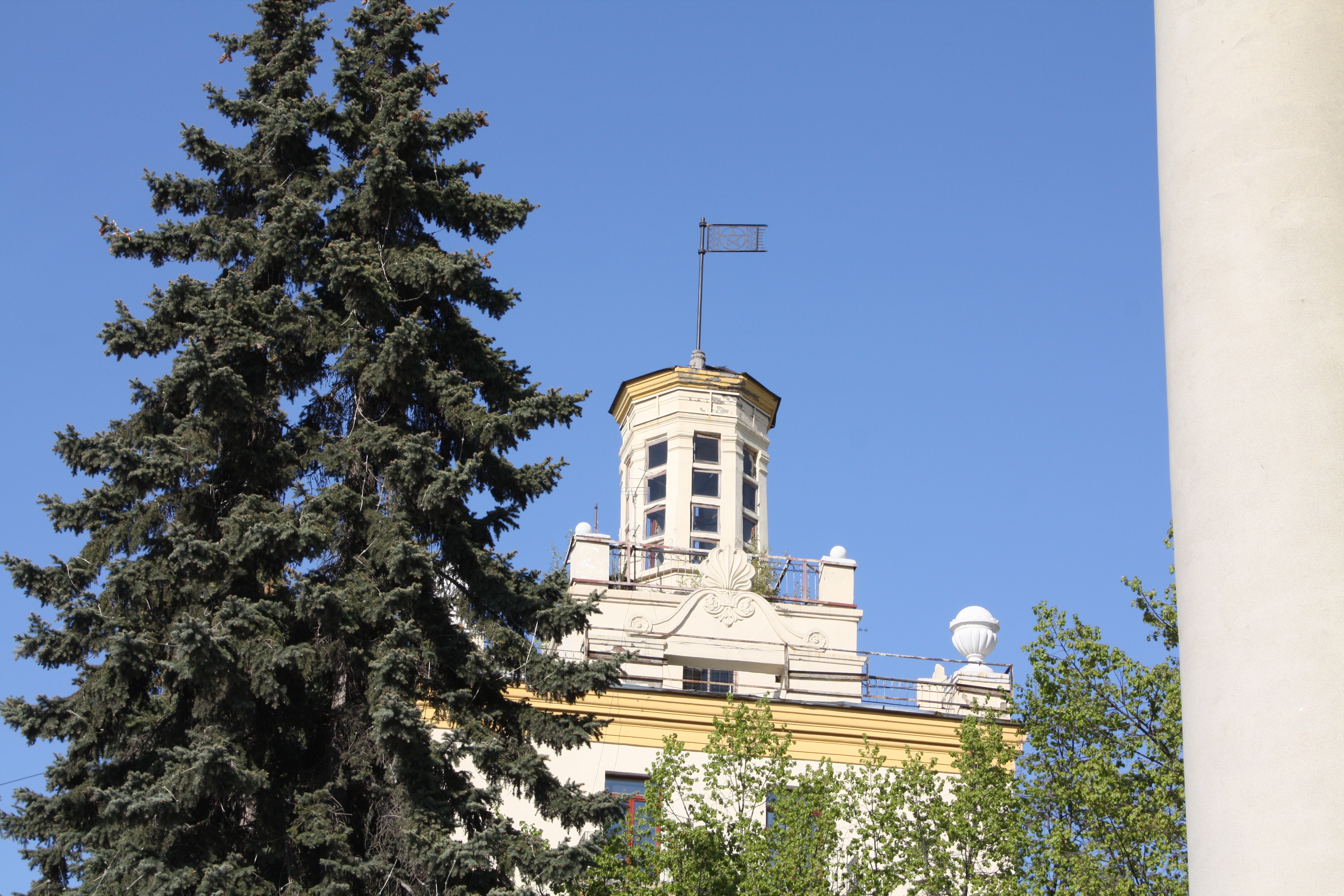
Bohdan Khmelnytsky Street 42.
