= Kalininsky District, Novosibirsk =

Kalininsky City District
- District
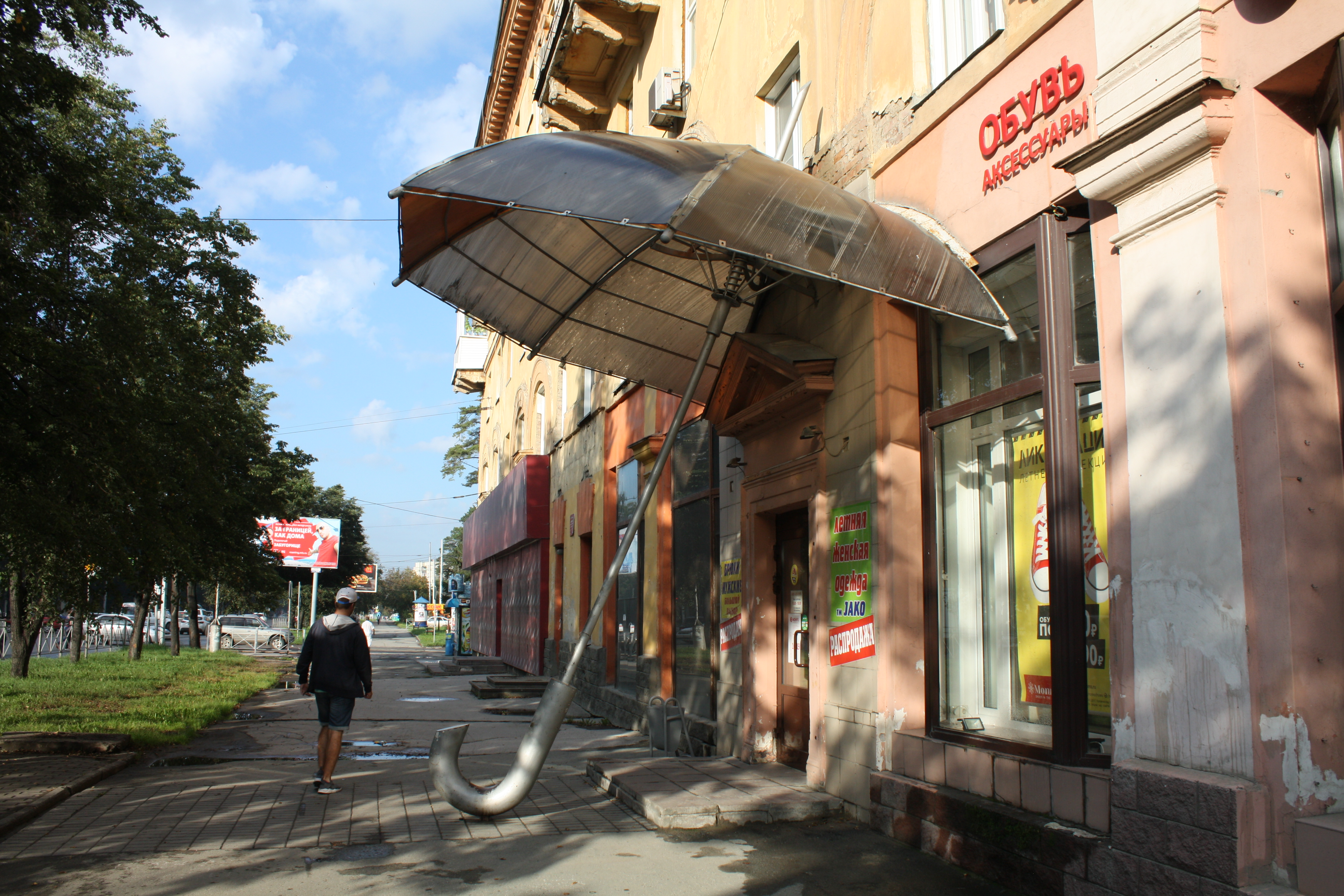

- Coat of arms
- Location of Kalininsky City District
- Coordinates: 55°06′N 83°00′E
- Country: Russia
- Federal subject: Novosibirsk
- Established: 1980

Area
  - Total: 46.2 km^{2} (17.8 sq mi)

Kalininsky City District (Russian: Калининский район) is an administrative district (raion), one of the 10 raions of Novosibirsk, Russia. The area of the district is 46.2 square kilometres (17.8 sq mi). Population: 200,694 (2018).

== History ==
In 1980, part of the Dzerzhinsky District became the Kalininsky District. Kalininsky raion is the newest district of the city.

In 2000, Pashino Settlement was included in the district.

In 2005, Klyukvenny Settlement became part of the Kalininsky district.

== Bodies of water ==
The Sukhoy Log Creek flows through the district.

== Microdistricts ==
=== Rodniki ===
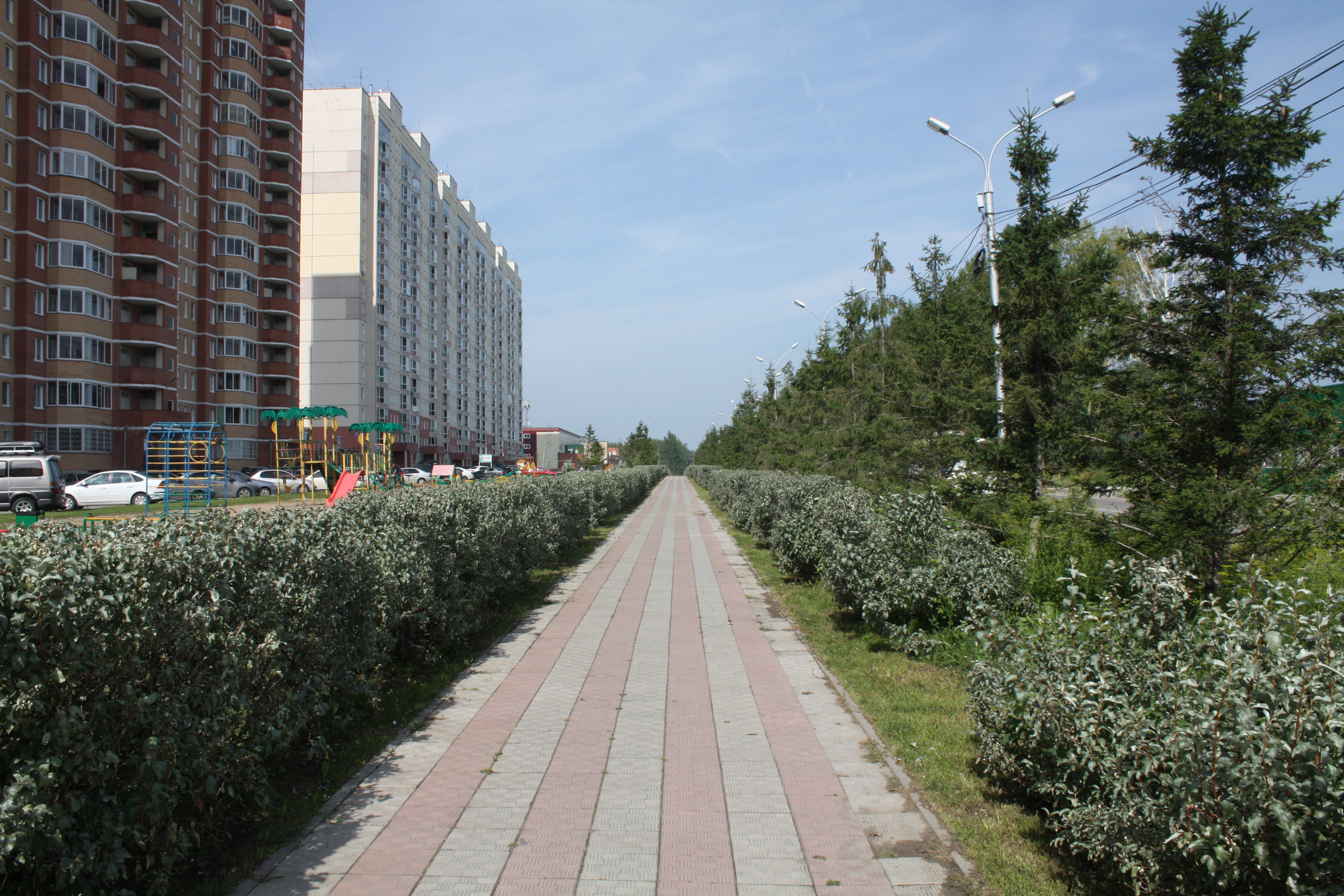

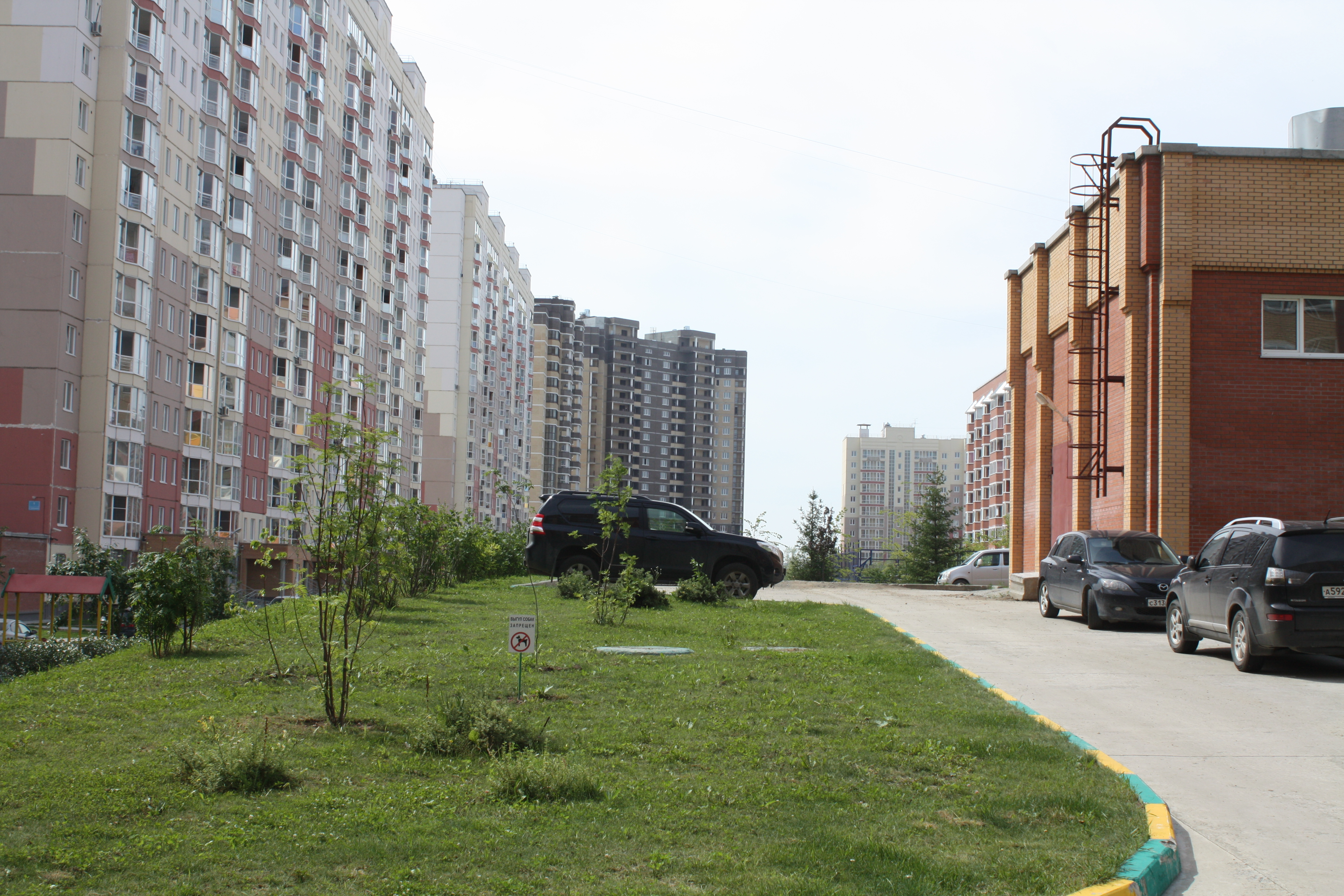

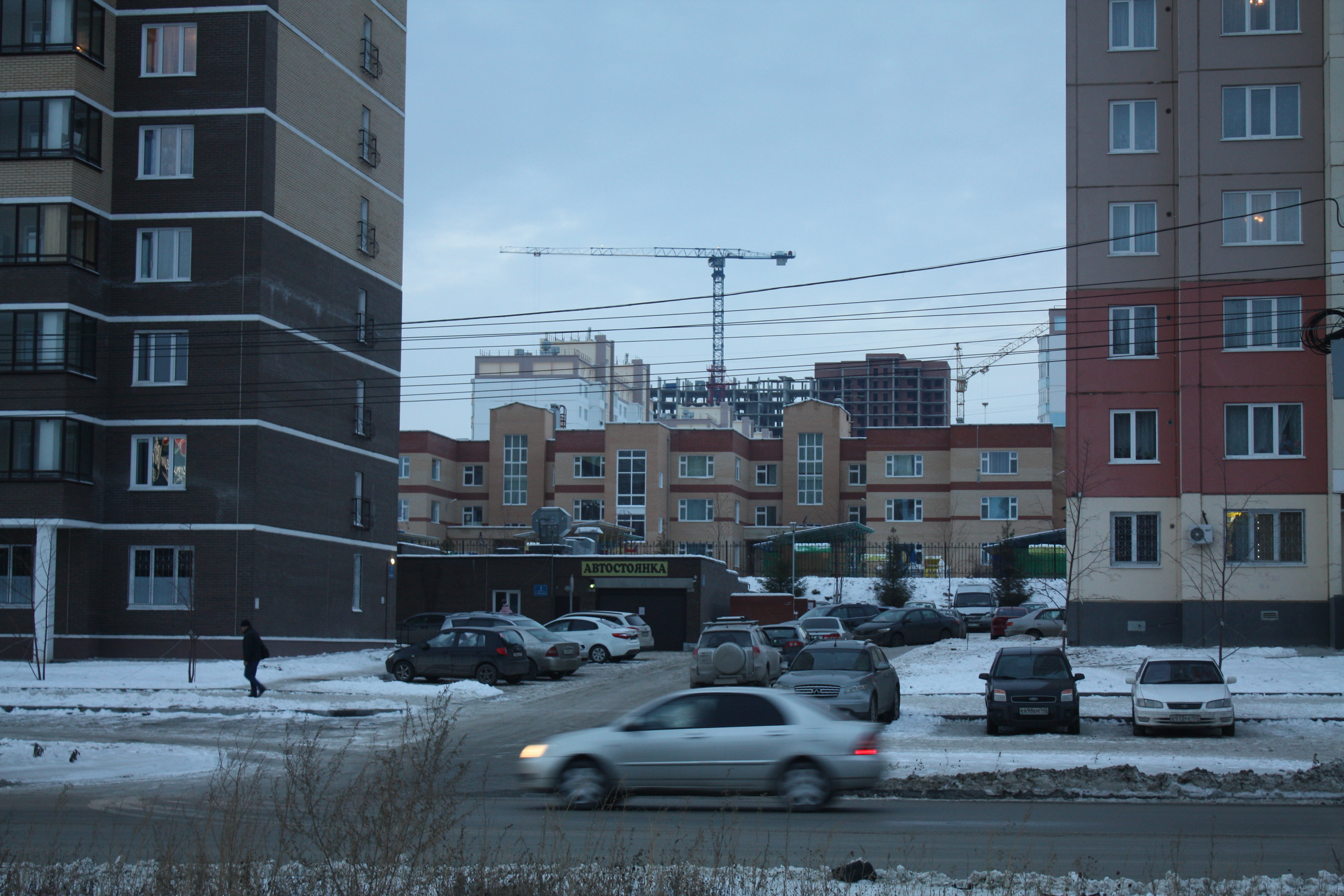

=== Snegiri ===
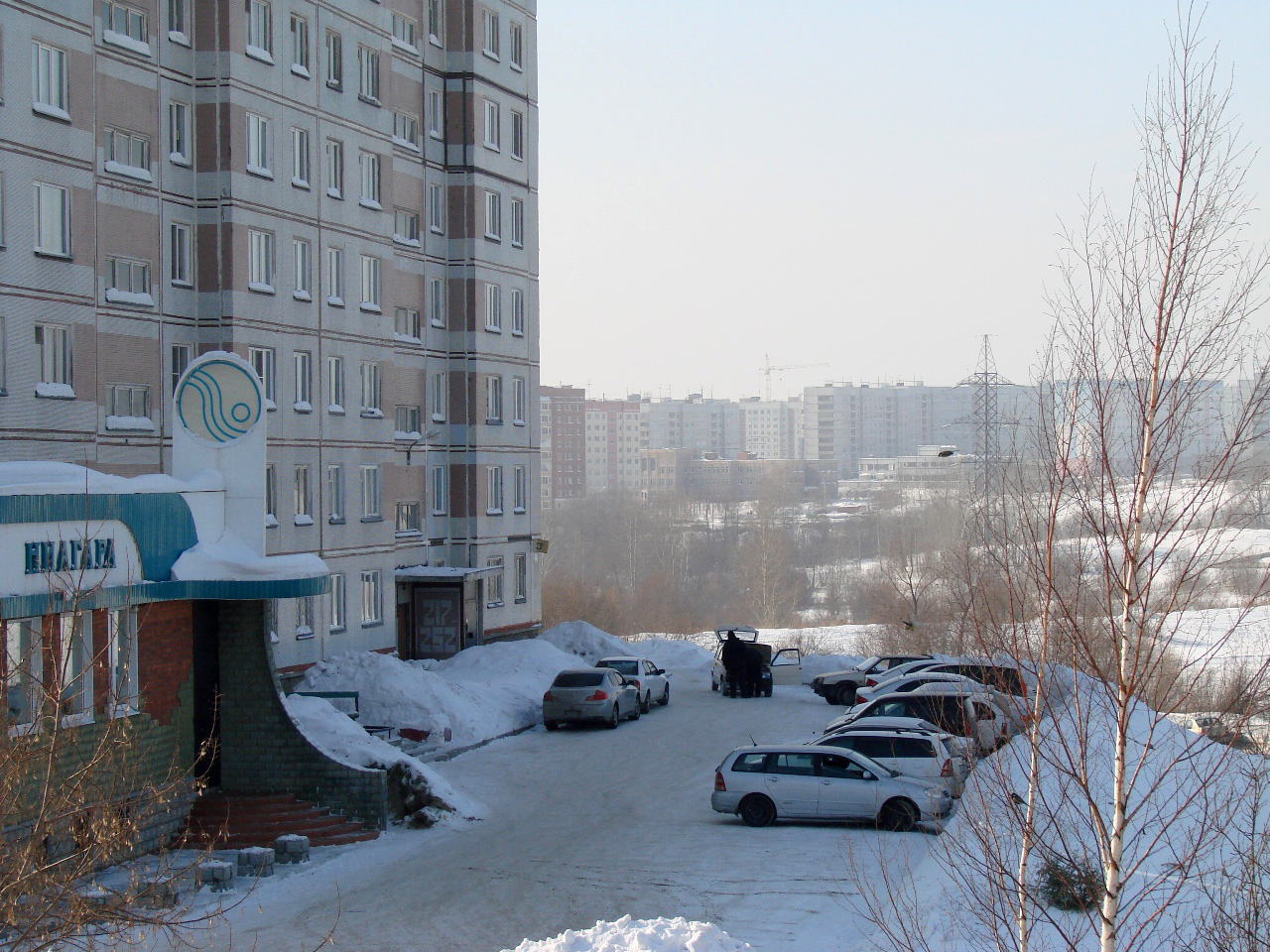

== Architecture ==
=== Soviet architecture ===
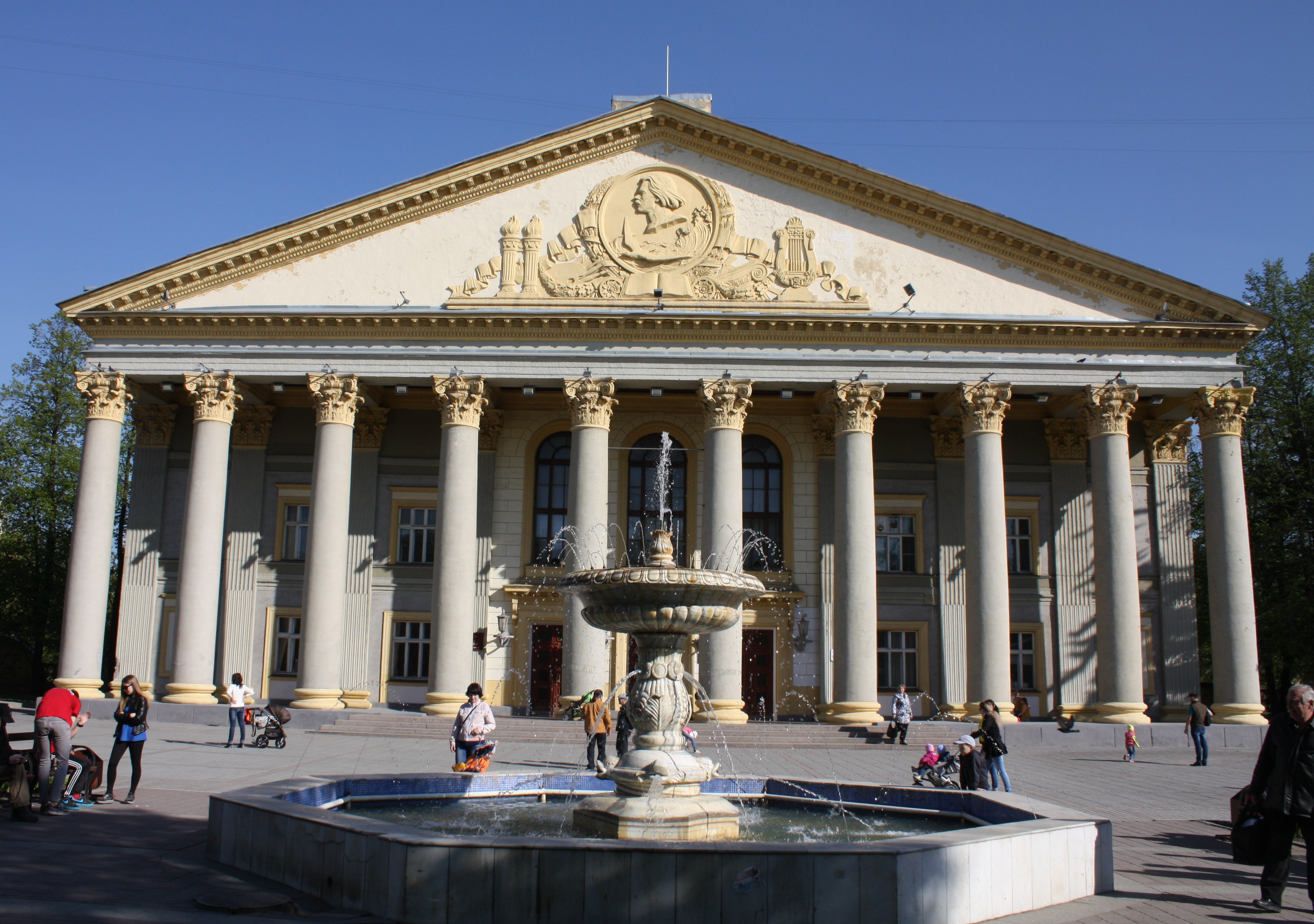
Palace of Culture named after Maxim Gorky, 1957

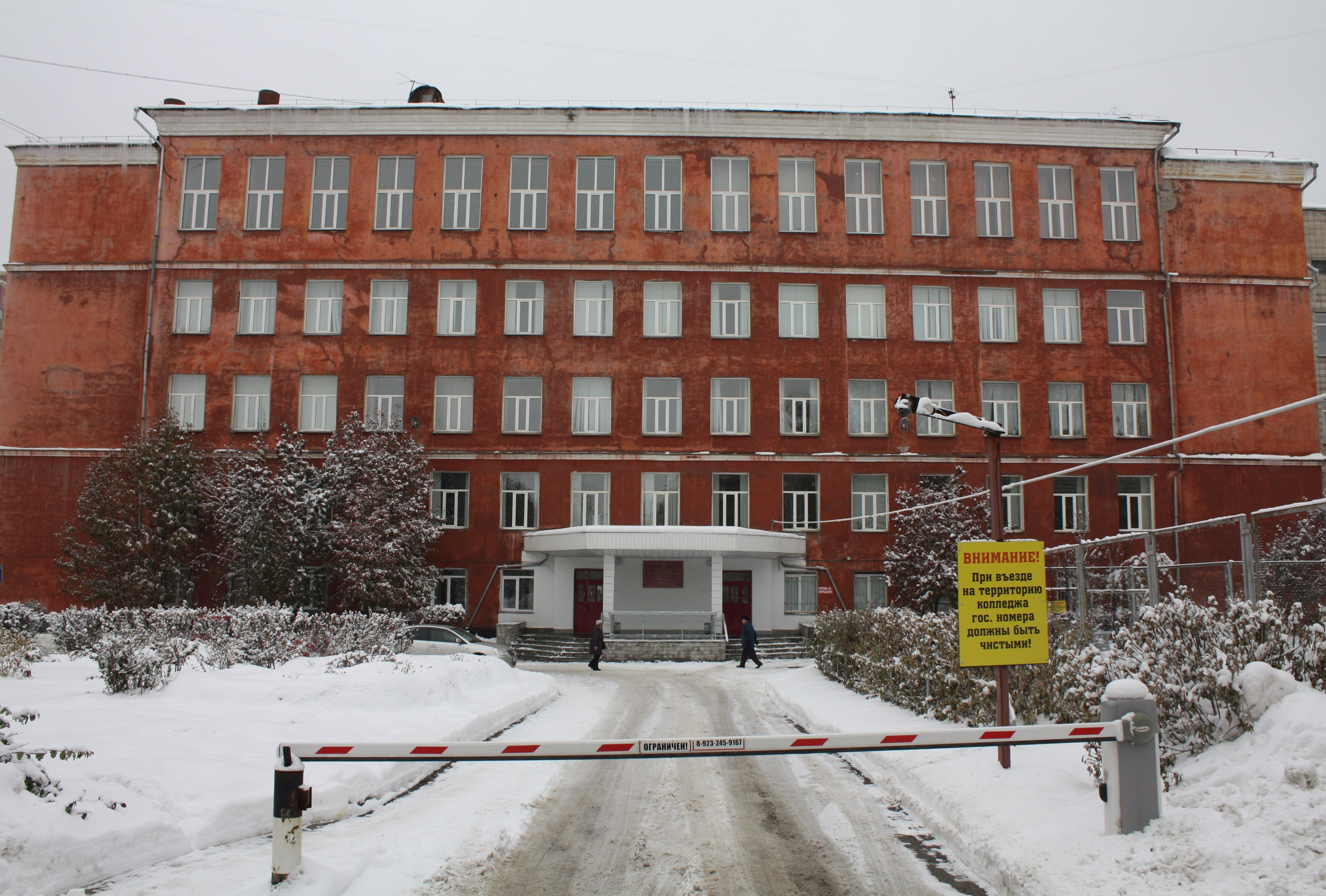

=== Post-Soviet architecture ===
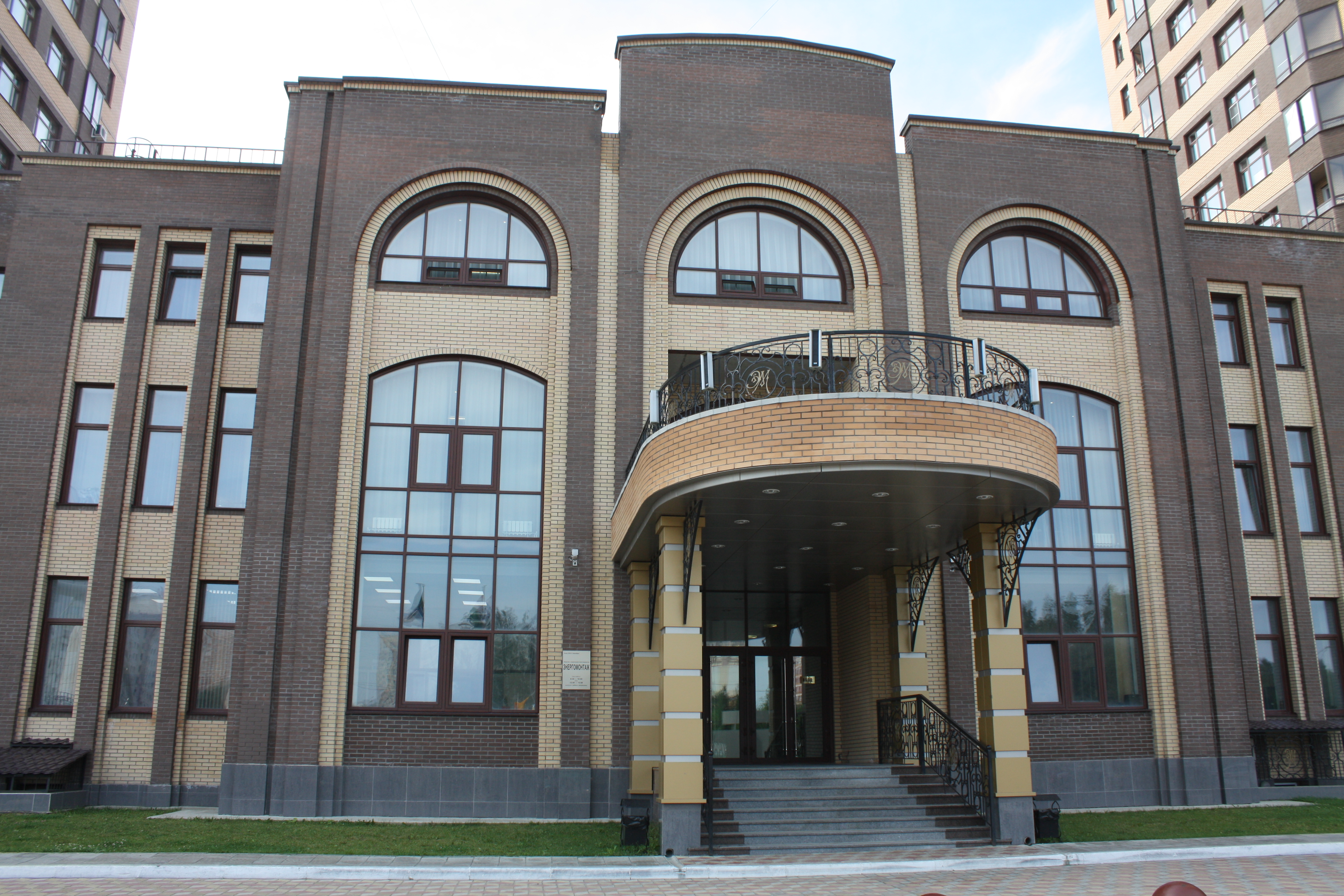

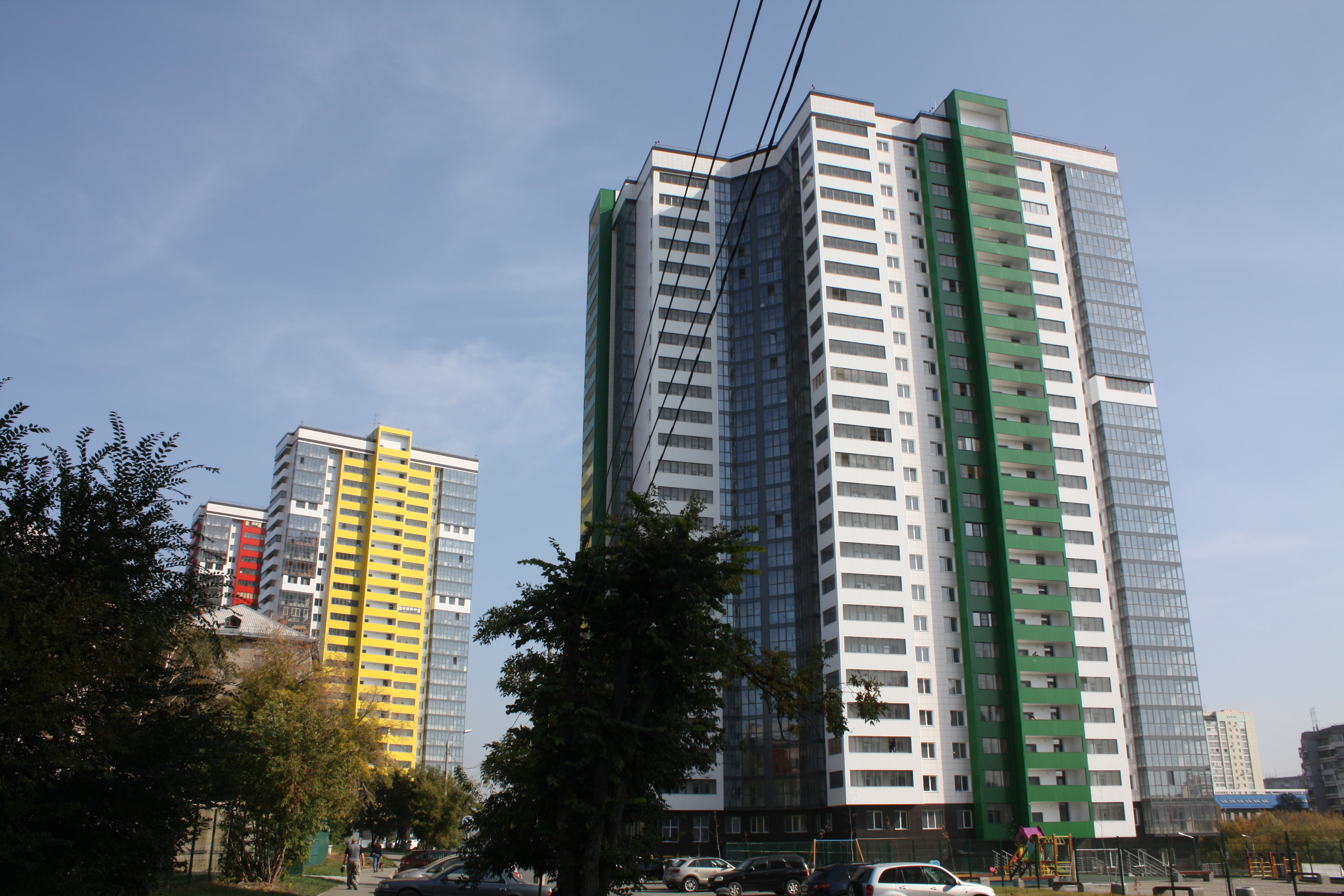

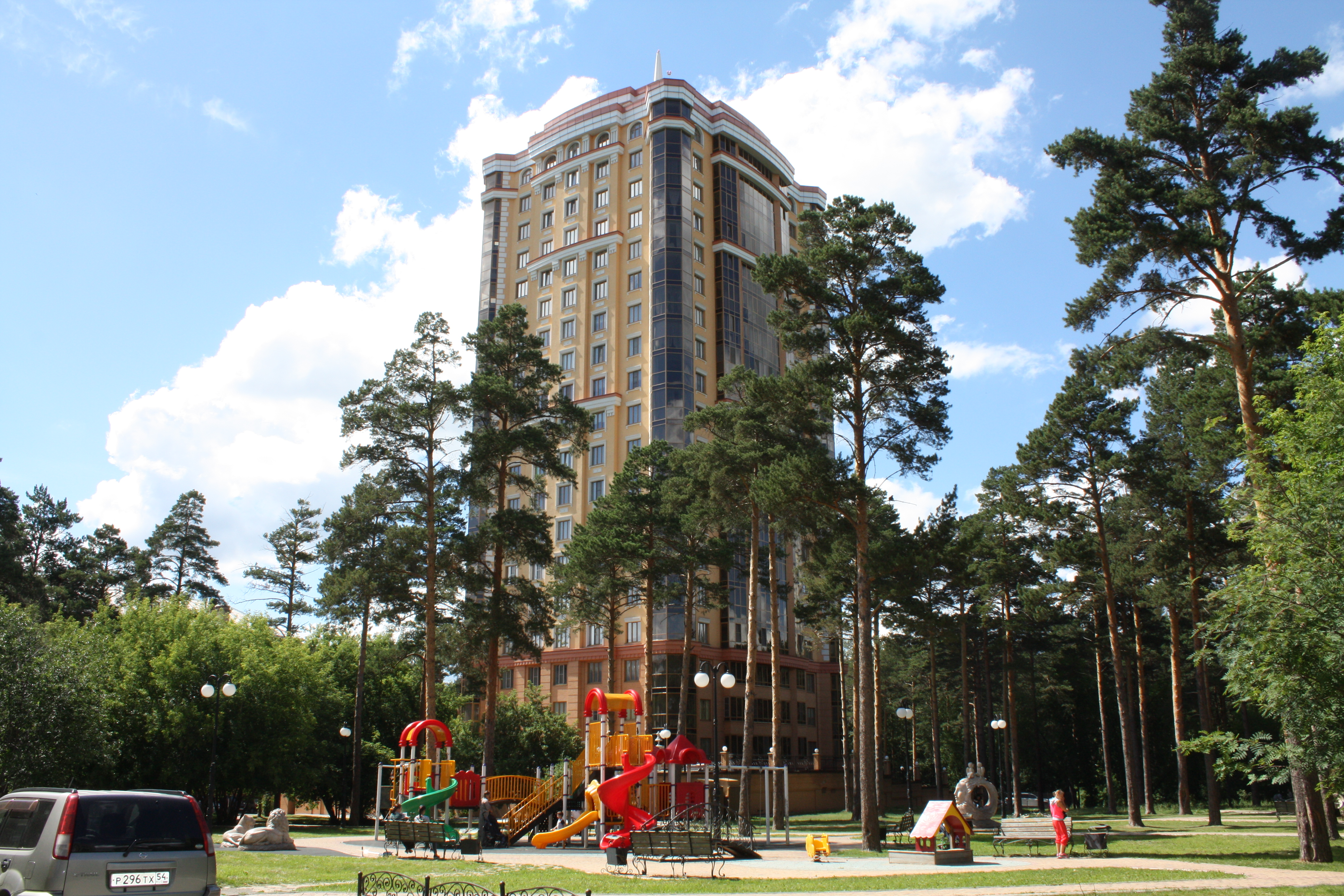

== Education ==
- Gymnasium 12
- Lyceum 28
- Lyceum 126
- Novosibirsk Lyceum of Nutrition

== Sports ==
- Ice Sports Palace Sibir is the home arena of the HC Sibir Novosibirsk ice hockey team.
- Fencing sports complex with swimming pool
- Neptun Swimming Pool
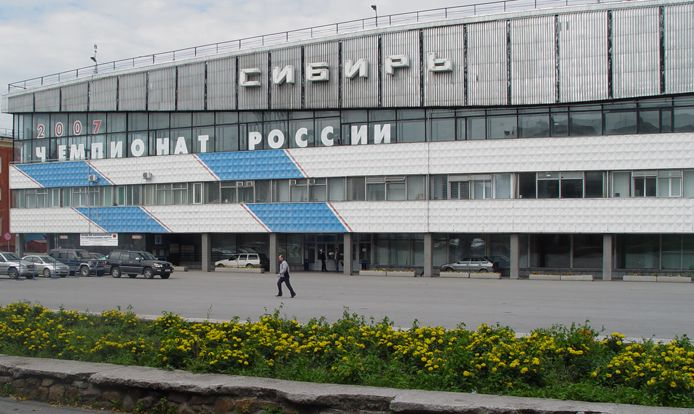
Sibir Sport Palace

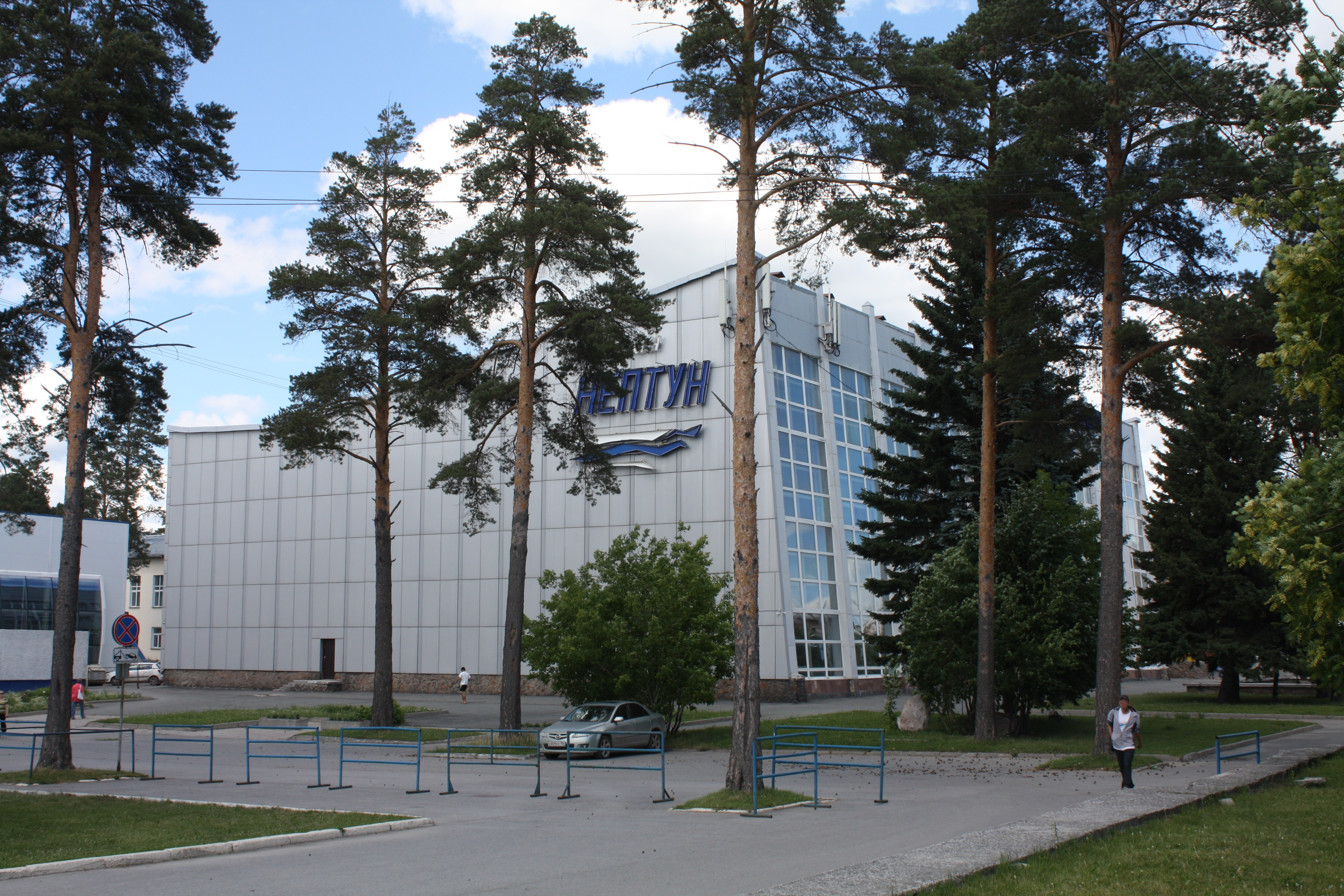
Neptun Swimming Pool

== Religion ==
=== Christianity ===
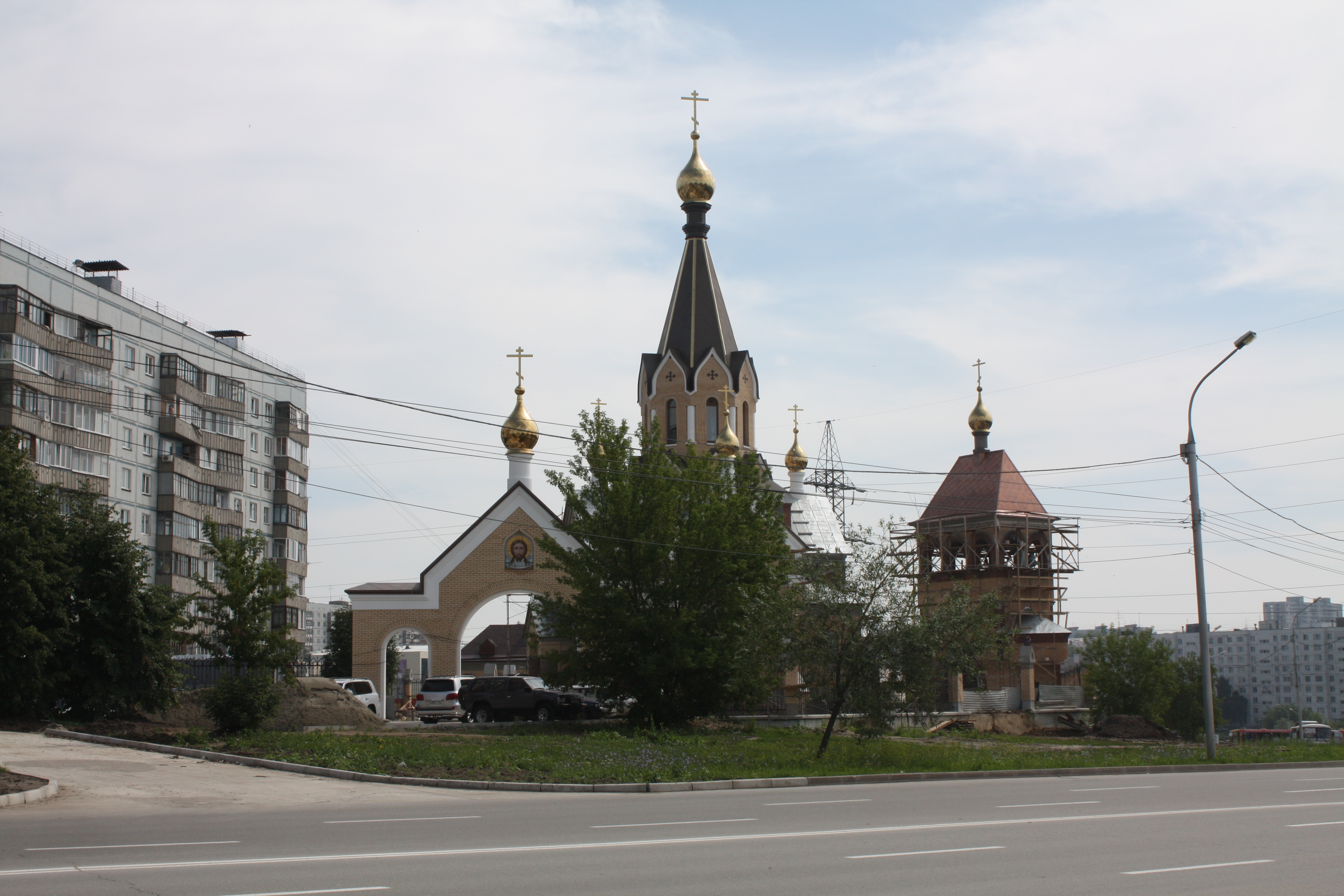

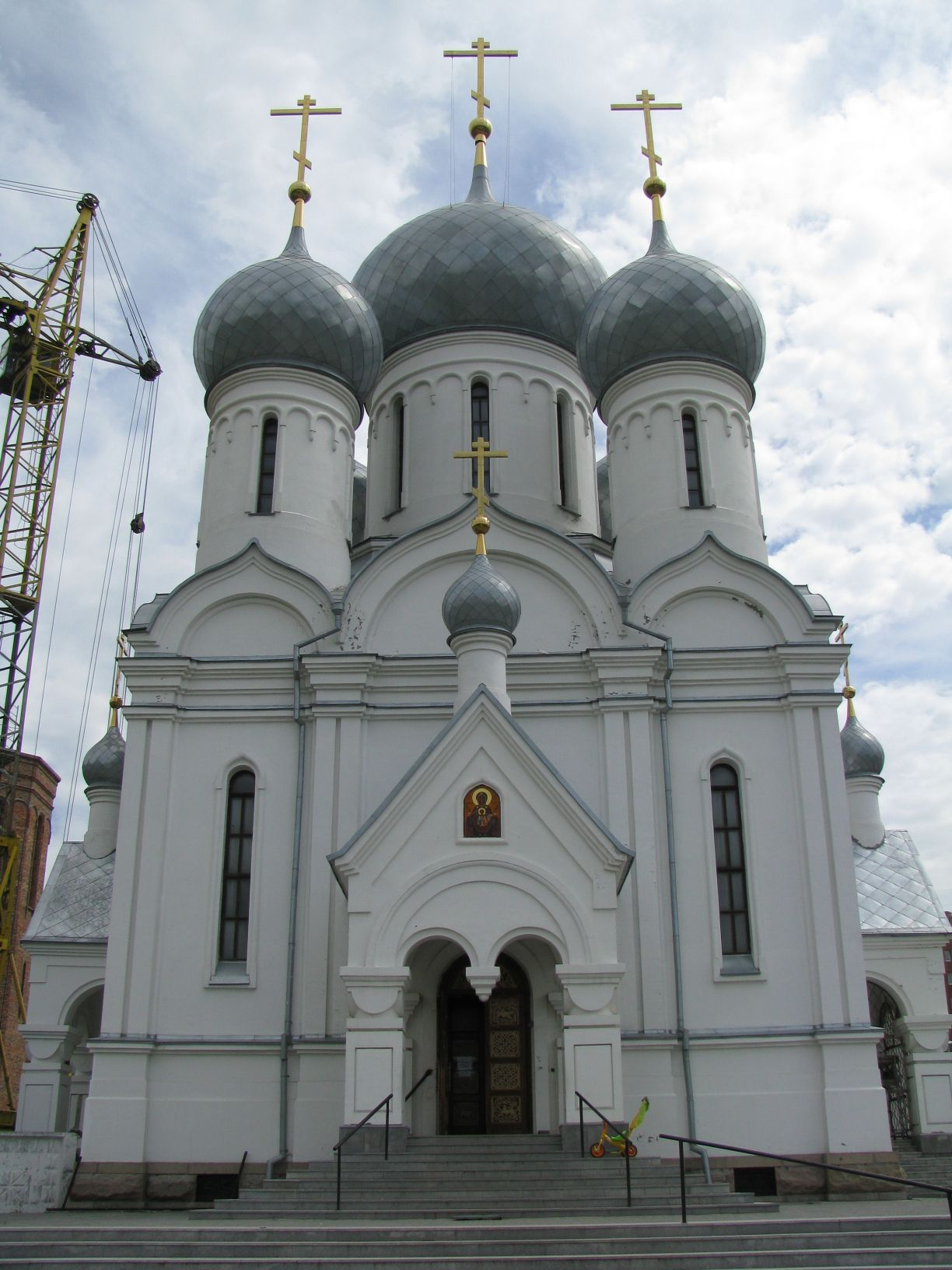
Church of the Theotokos of the Sign

== Parks ==
=== Sosnovy Bor ===
The park was founded in 1976. Its area is 96 hectares.

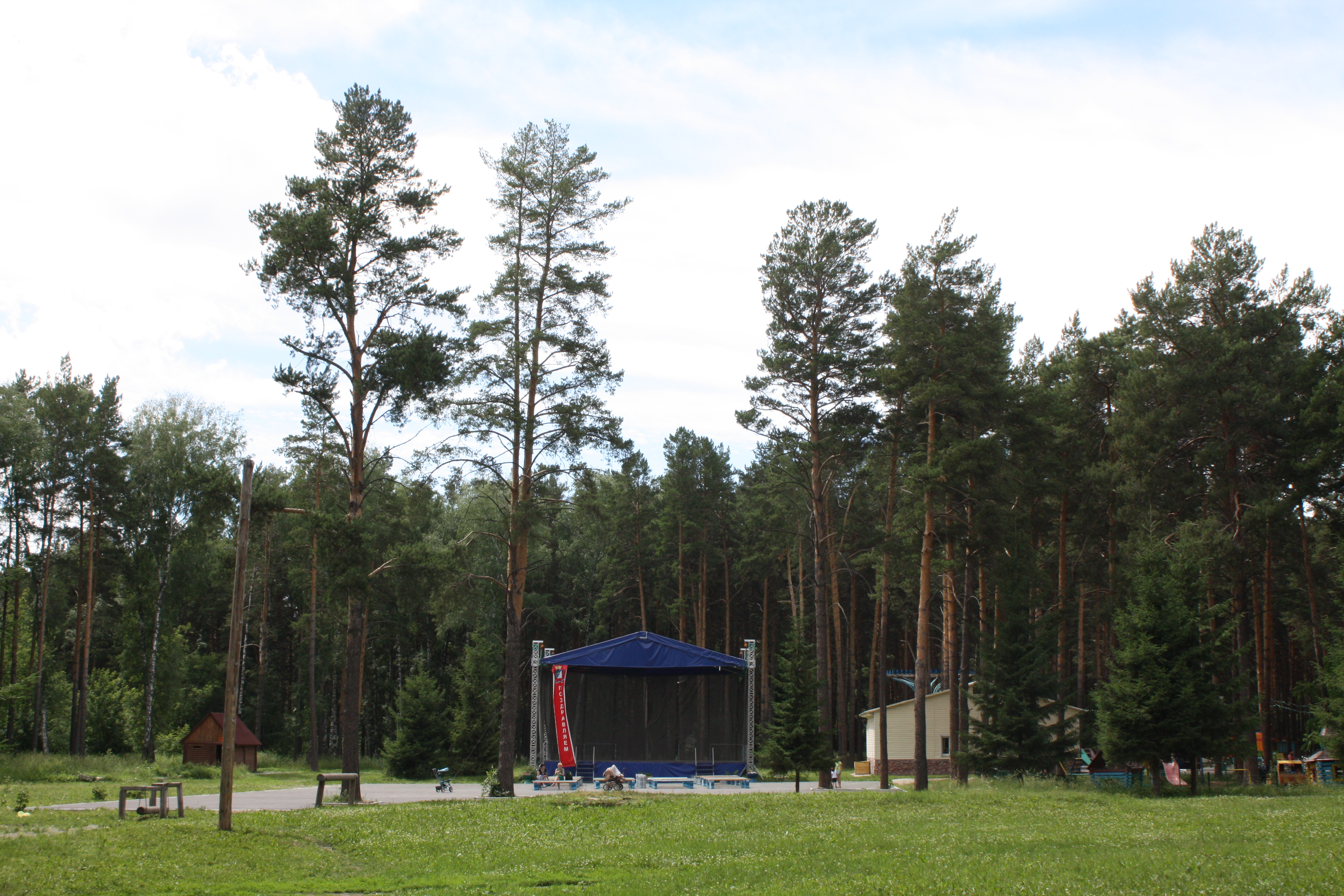

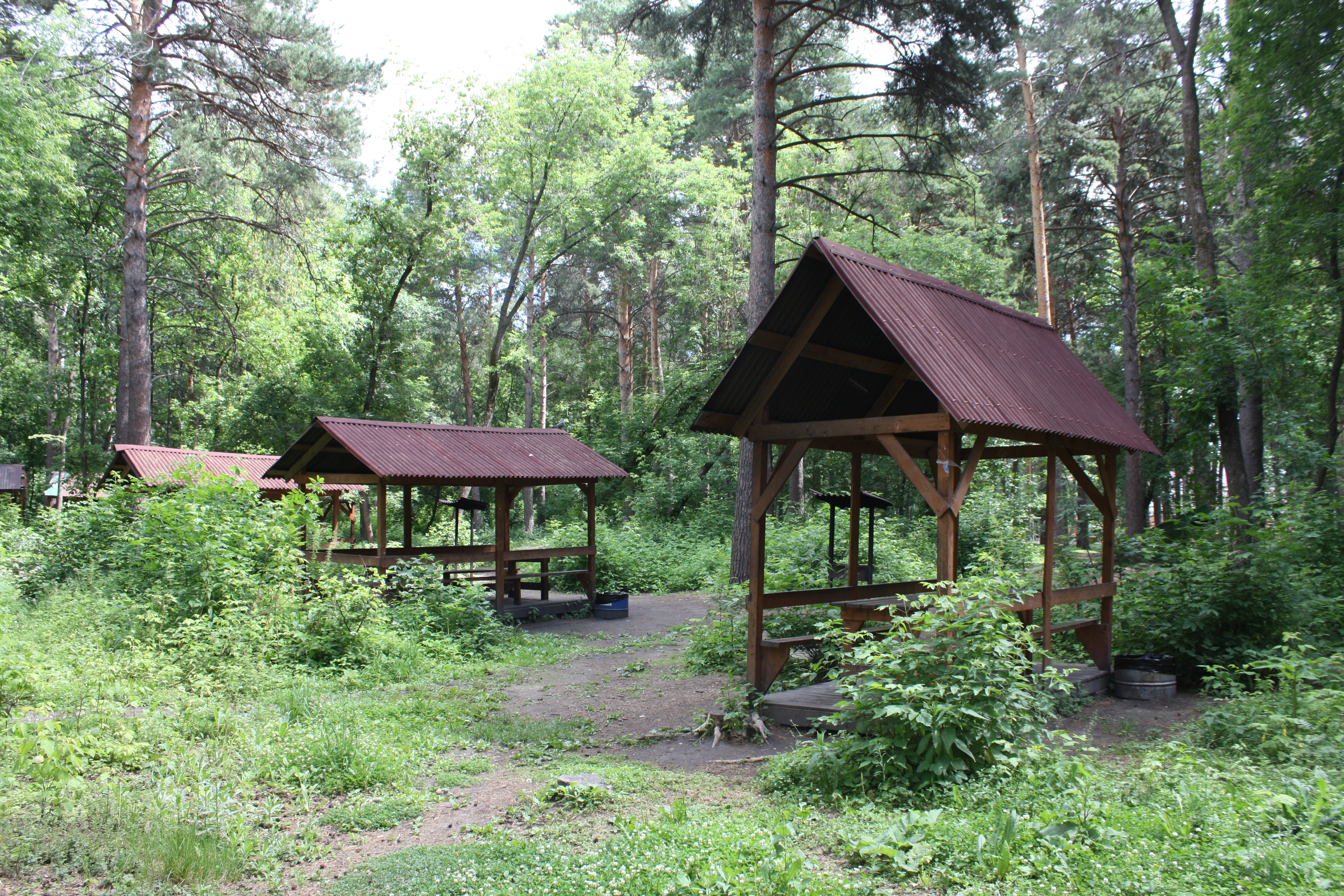

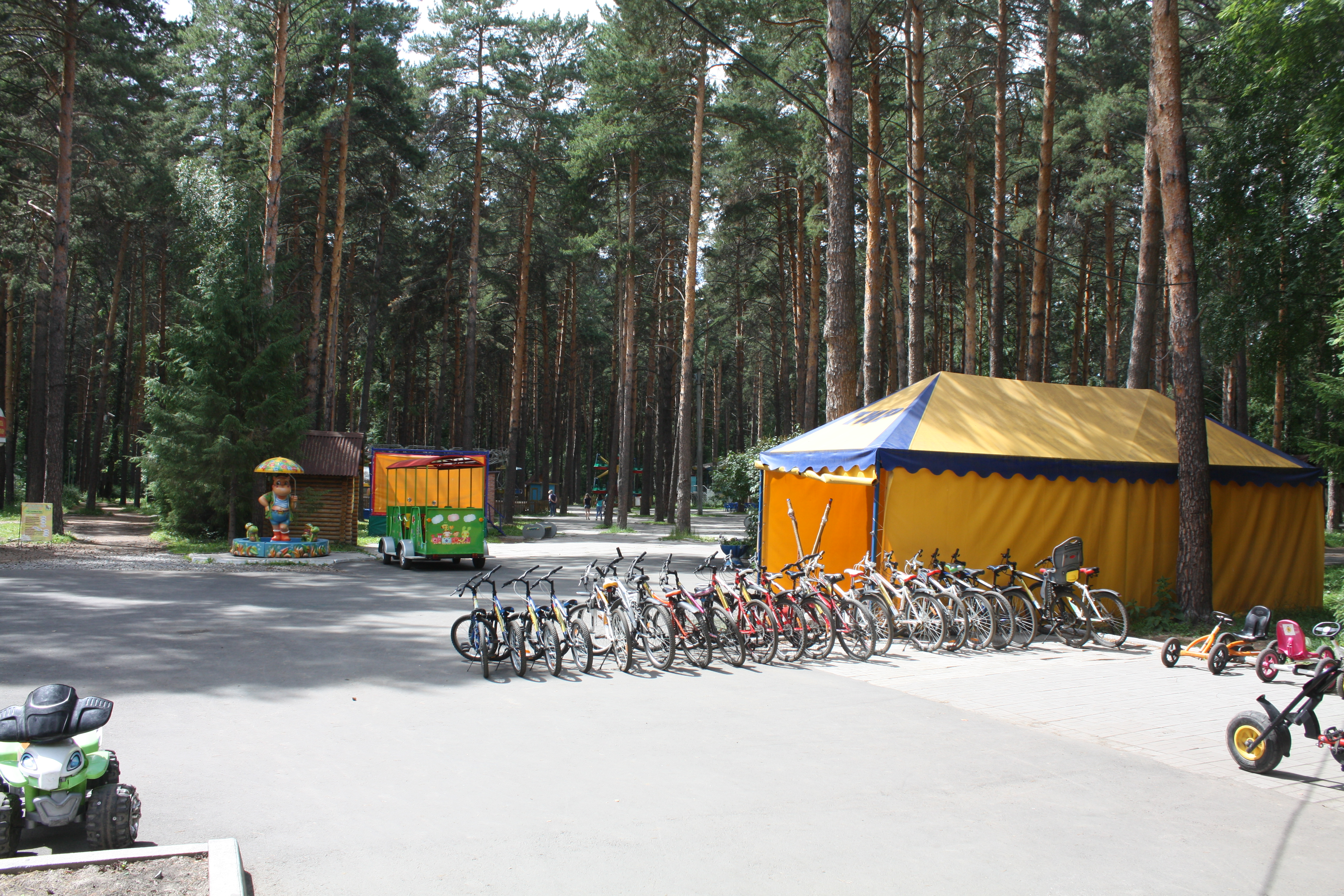

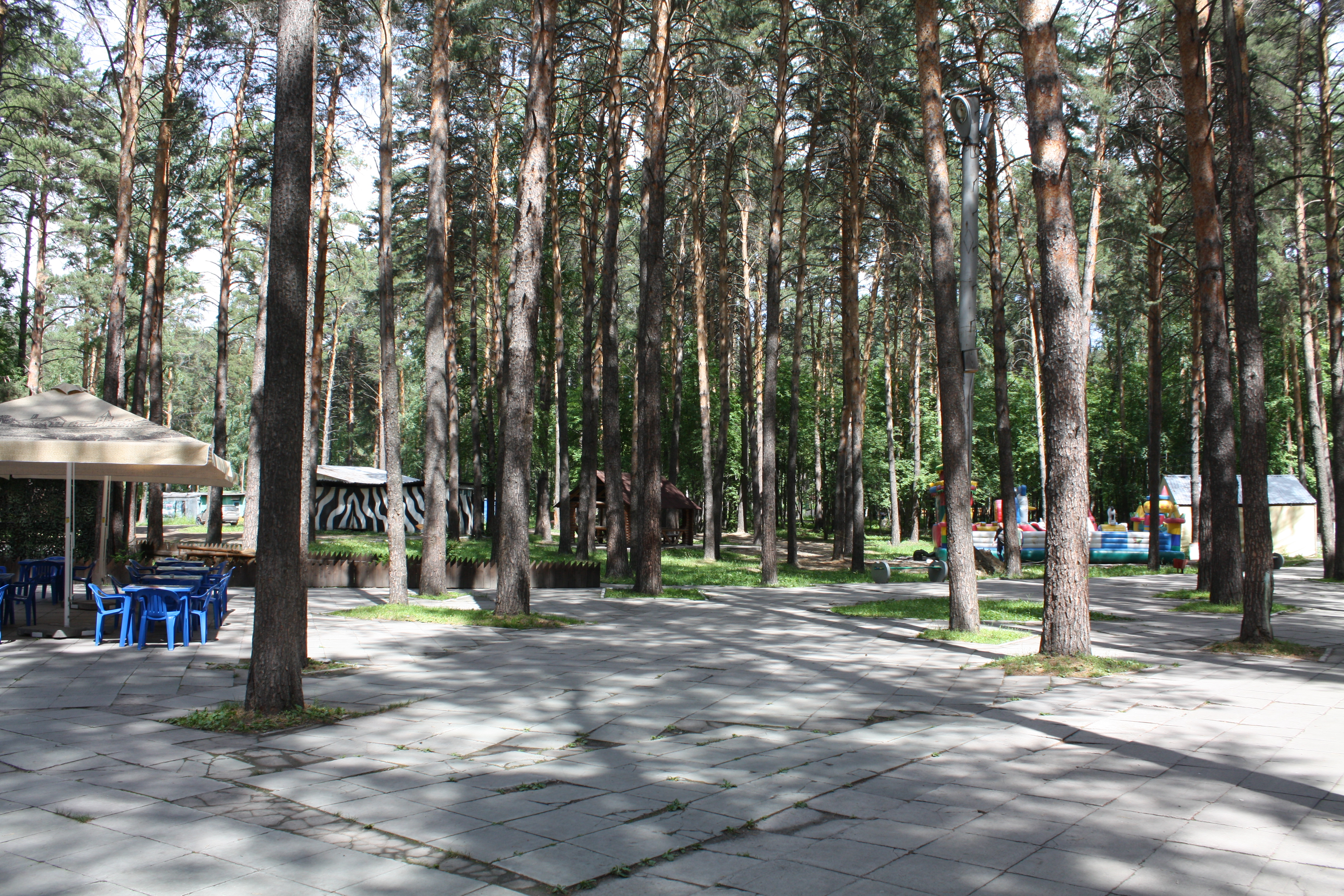

=== Pavlovsky Square ===
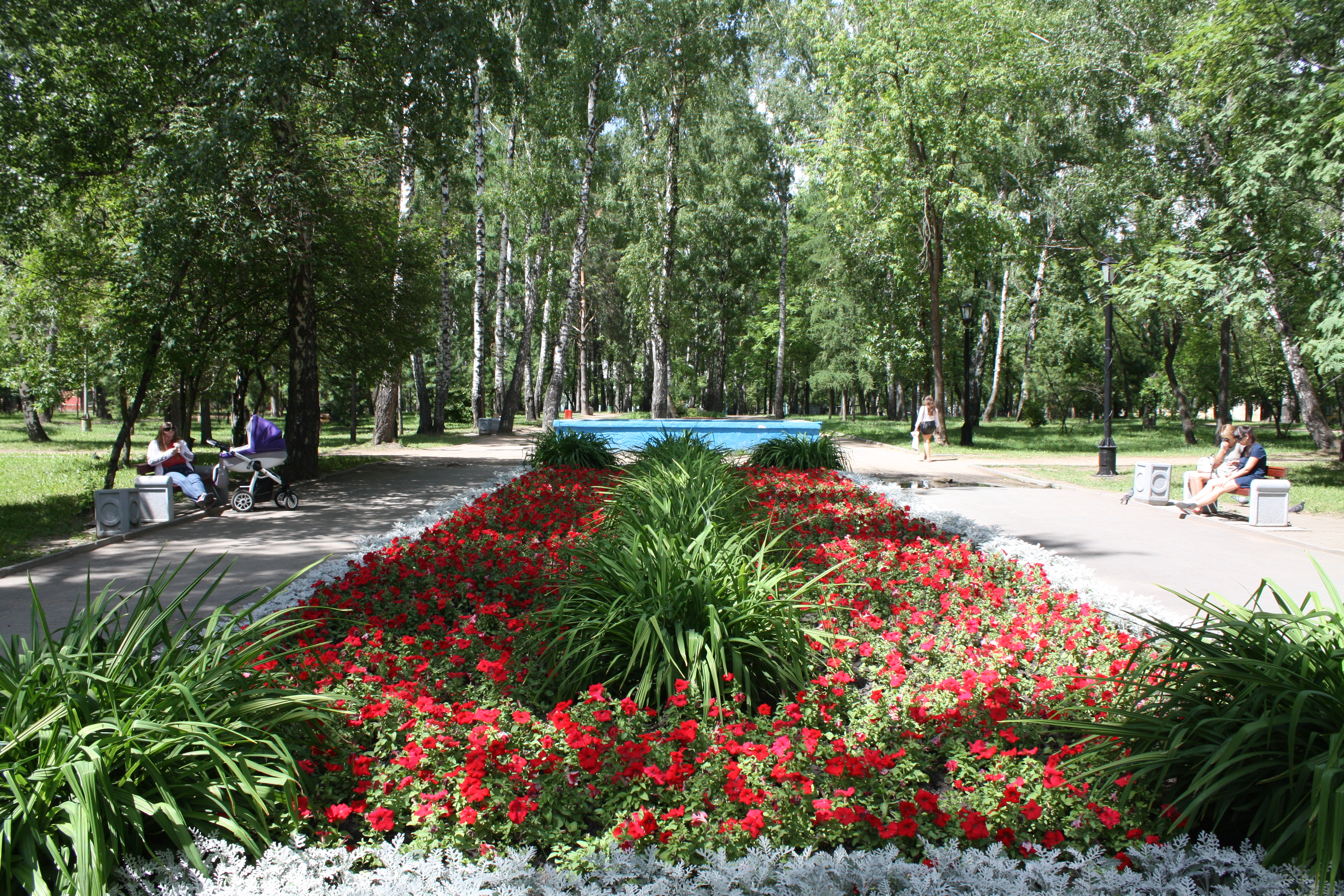

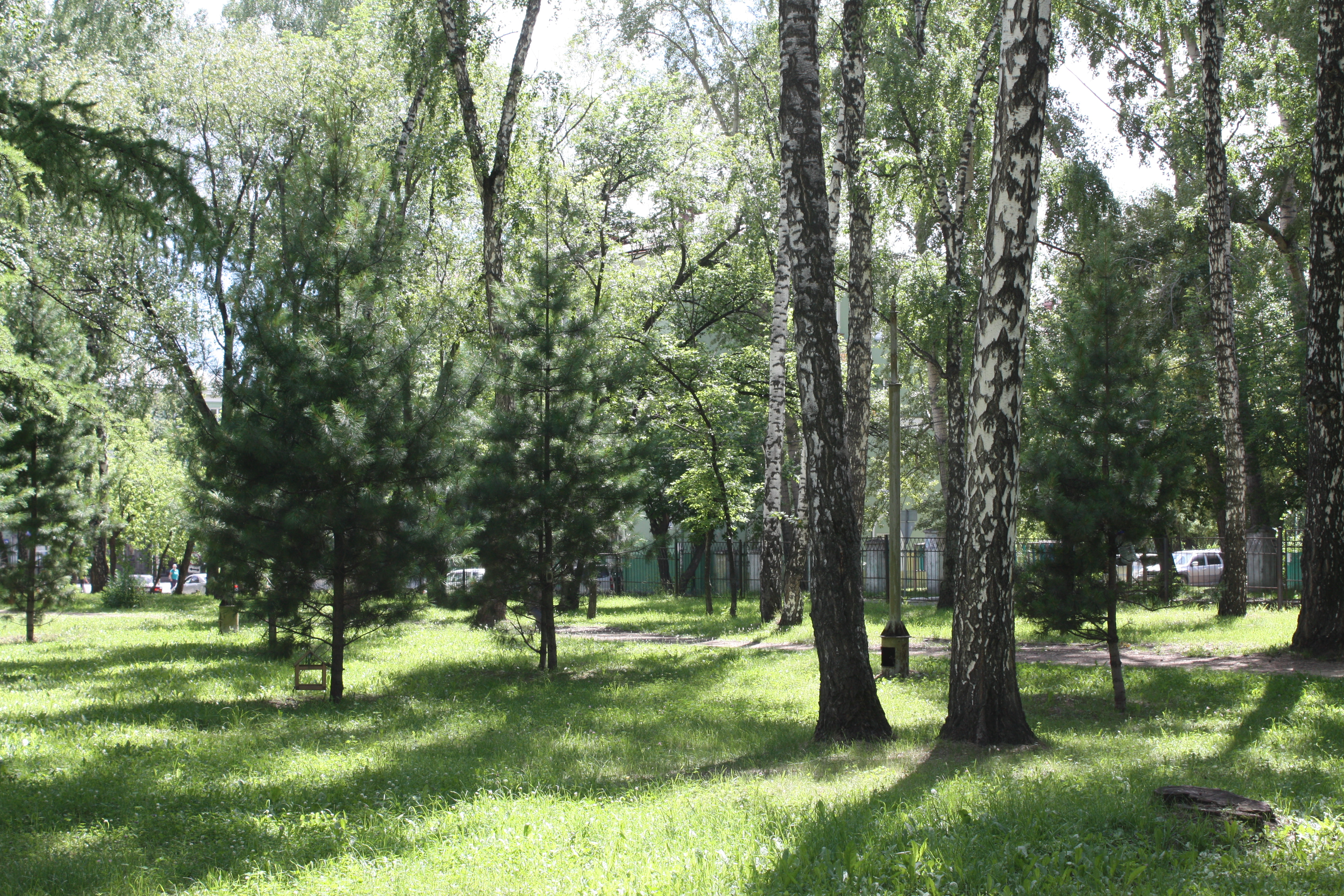

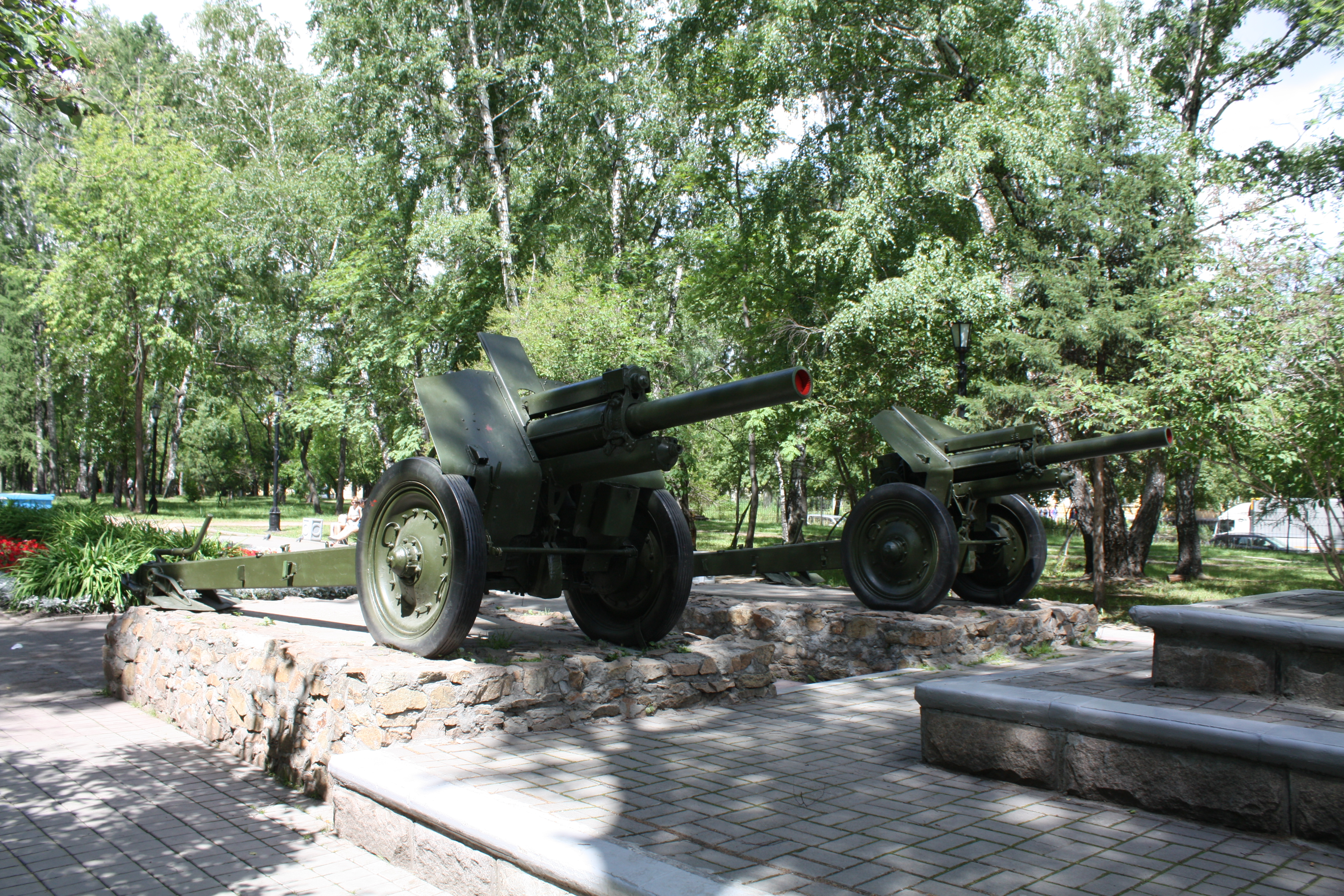

== Economy ==
=== Industry ===
- Novosibirsk Mechanical Plant
- Novosibirsk Chemical Concentrates Plant
- Novosibirsk Thermal Power Station 4

=== Retail ===
The district hosts shopping centres of famous retail companies: Auchan, Leroy Merlin, Lenta.

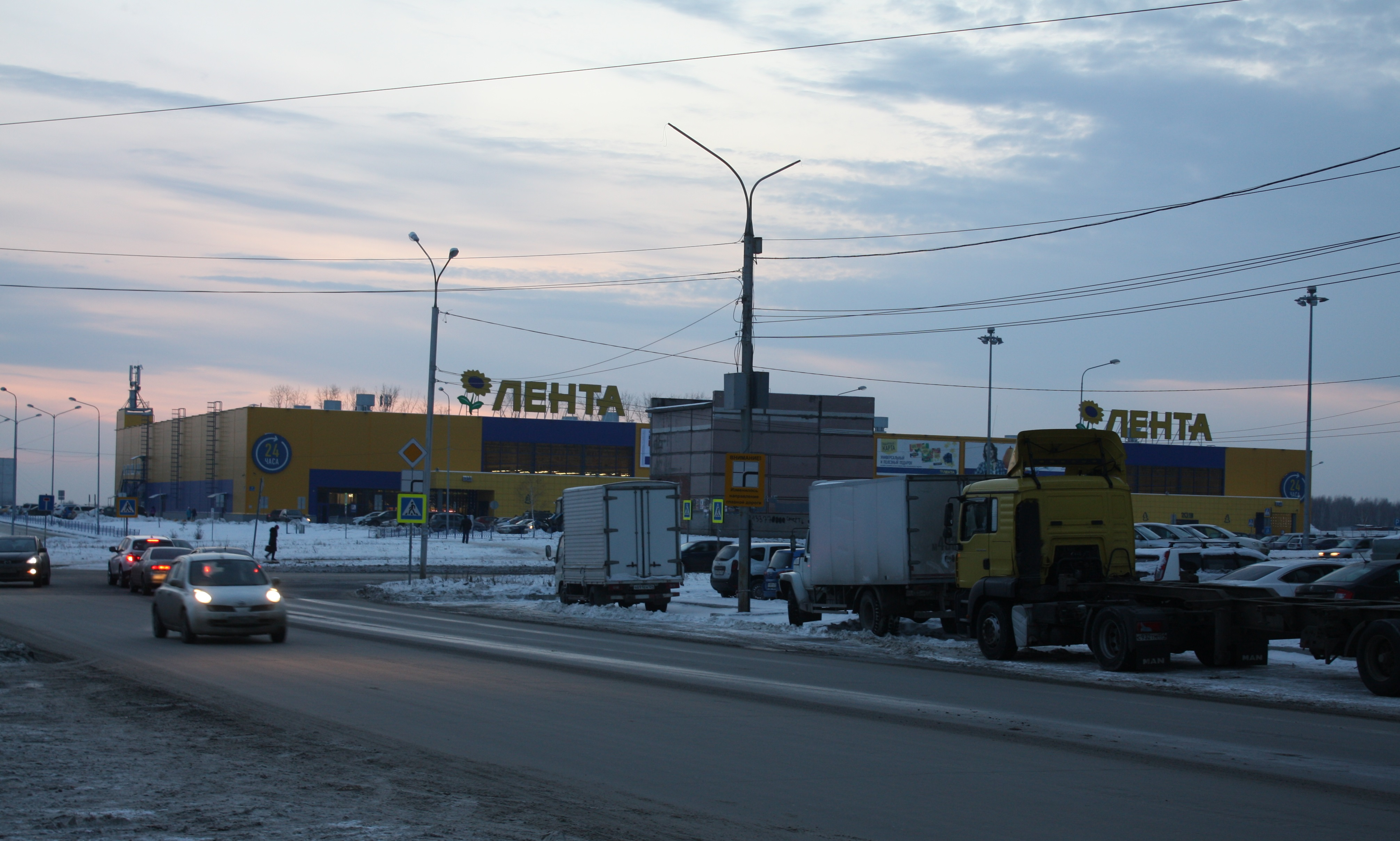
Lenta=

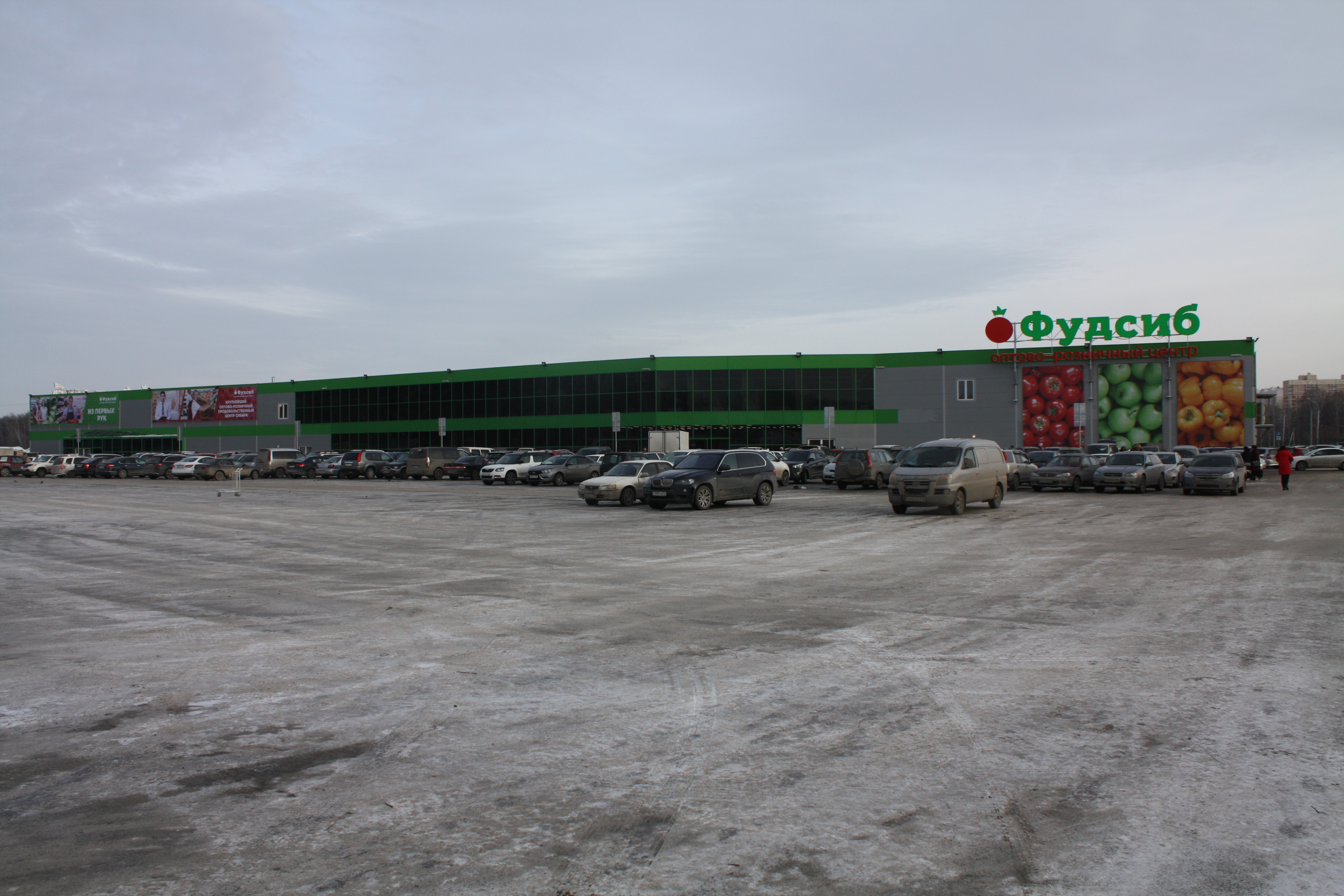
Foodsib, wholesale and retail center in Novosibirsk.

== Transportation ==
- Bus
- Trolleybus
- Tram
