= Lenin Square, Novosibirsk =

Square in Novosibirsk, Russia

Lenin Square
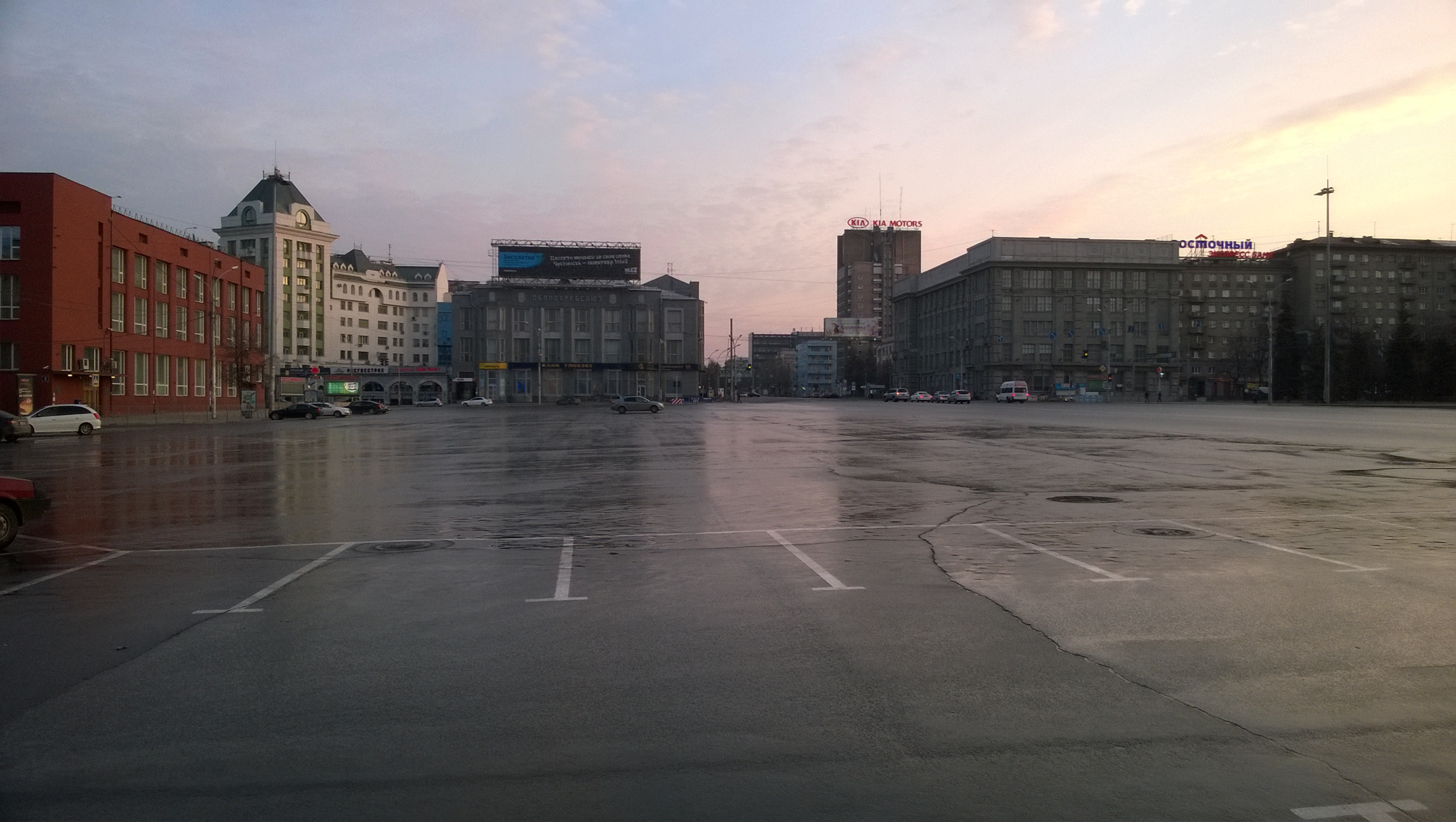
- Interactive map of Lenin Square
- Native name: Площадь Ленина (Russian)
- Location: Novosibirsk; Russia
- Coordinates: 55°01′49″N 82°55′16″E

Lenin Square (Russian: Площадь Ленина) is the main square of Novosibirsk, located in the Tsentralny City District. It consists of Transport and Theater squares.

== History ==
=== Tsarist period ===
In 1901 a market square appeared here, it was called the New Market Square (Novaya Bazarnaya Ploshchad). Locals and people from other Siberian cities traded here.

In 1908, businessman Fedot Makhotin opened the first stationary cinema in the city. It was located on the site of the modern entrance to the metro in the southern part of the present square.

In 1911, the City Trade House was built on the square.

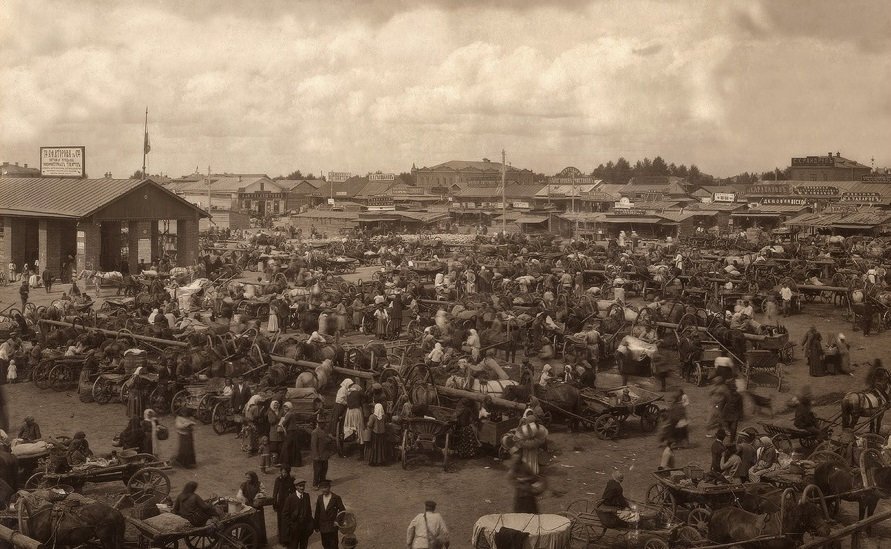
Trade on the square in 1913

=== Soviet period ===
In 1924, Building of State Institutions was constructed in the northern part of the square.

From 1926 to 1930, Prombank, Oblpotrebsoyuz Building, Business House and Gosbank were built here.

In 1944, Novosibirsk Opera and Ballet Theatre was completed on the square.

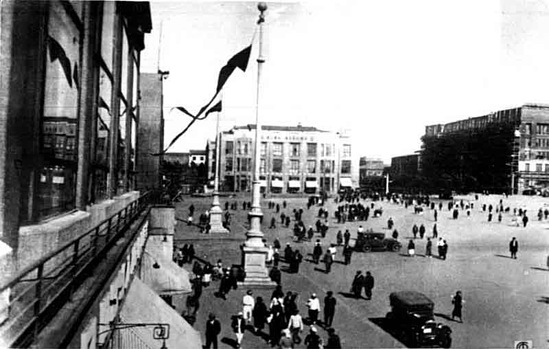

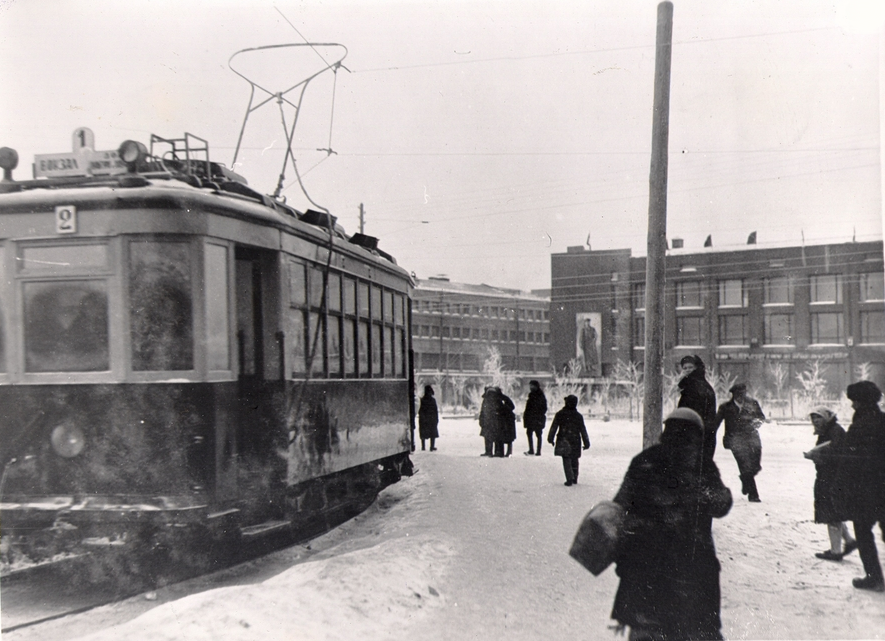
The square in 1934

== Buildings located on the square ==
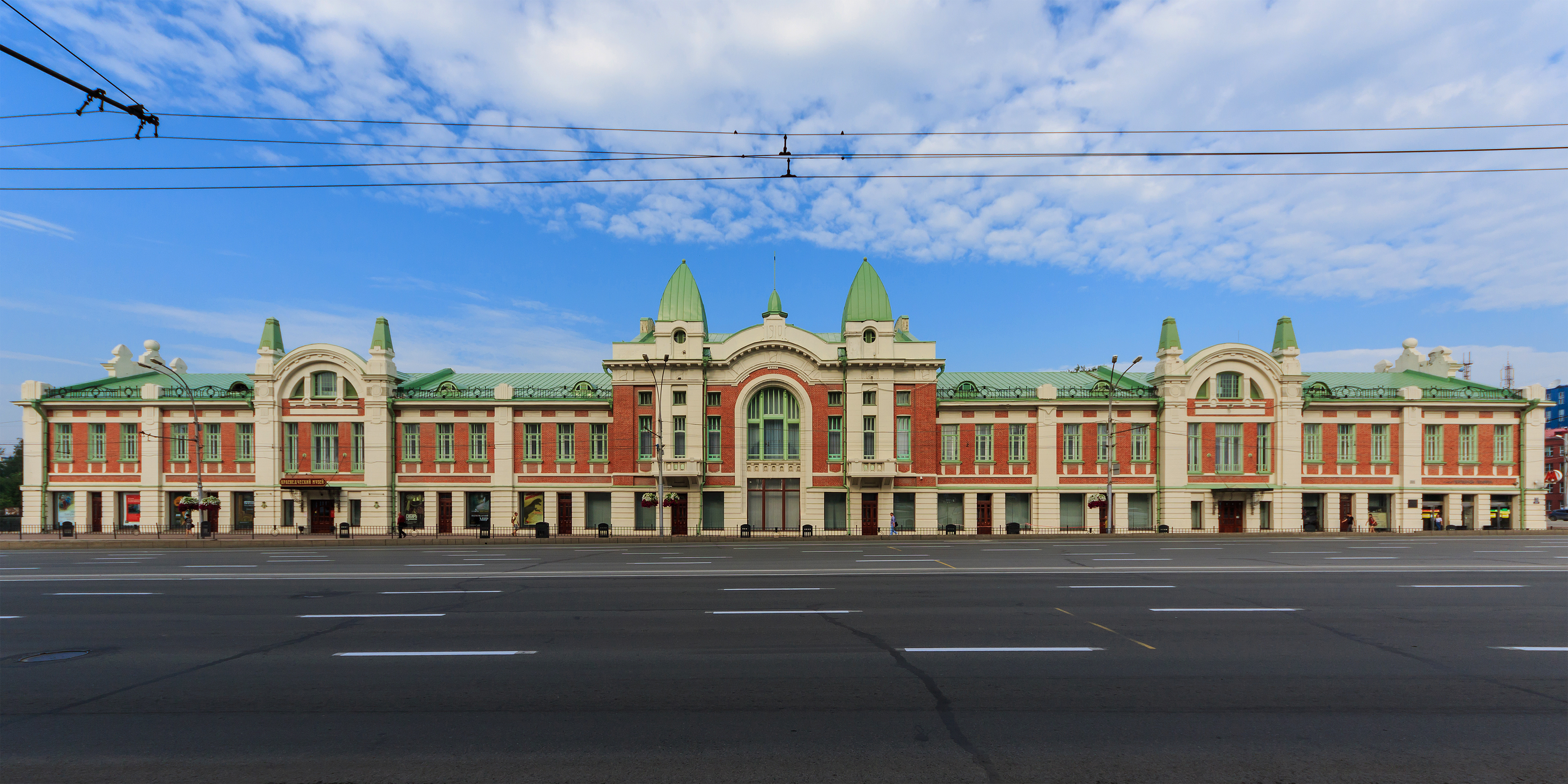
City Trade House

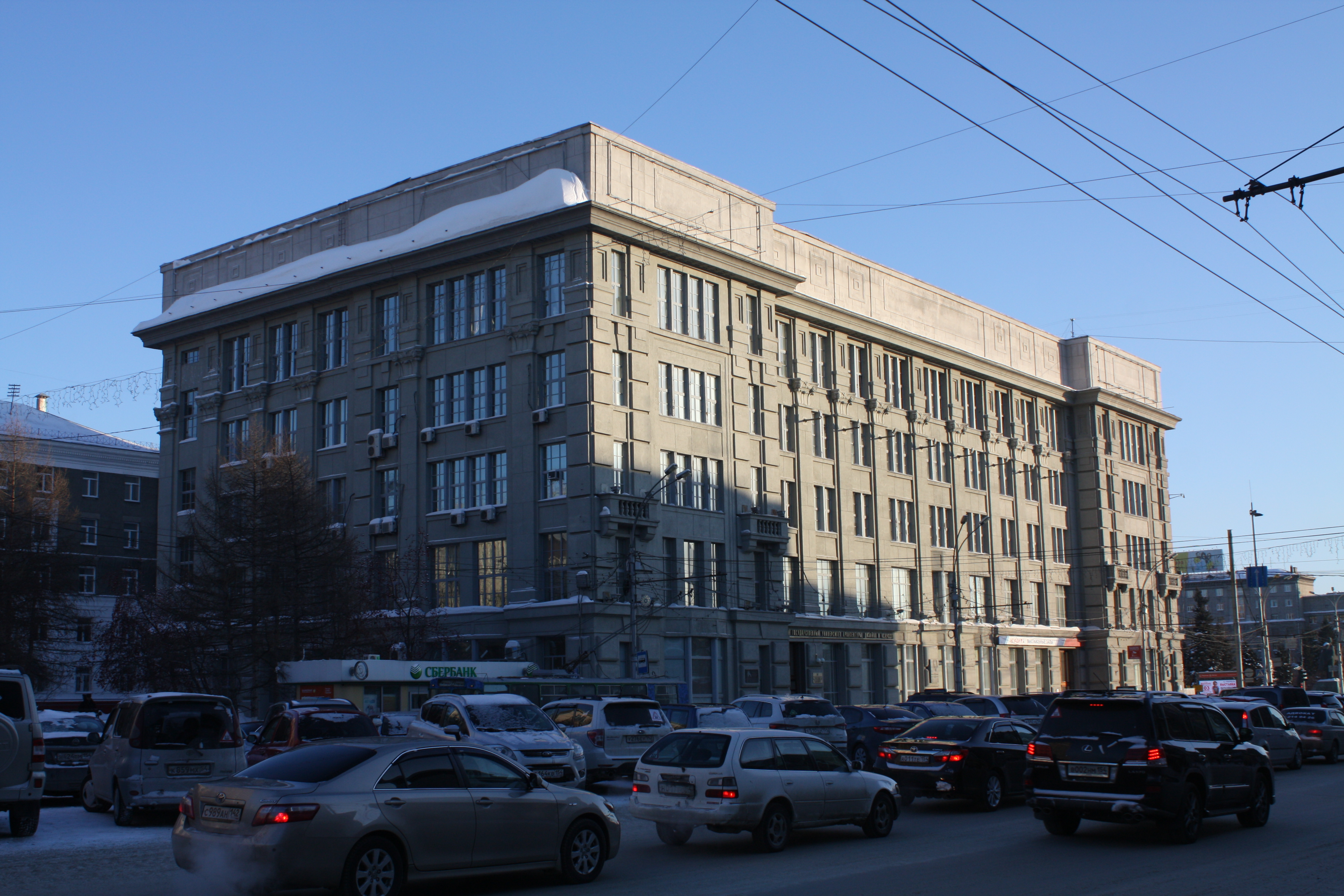
Building of State Institutions

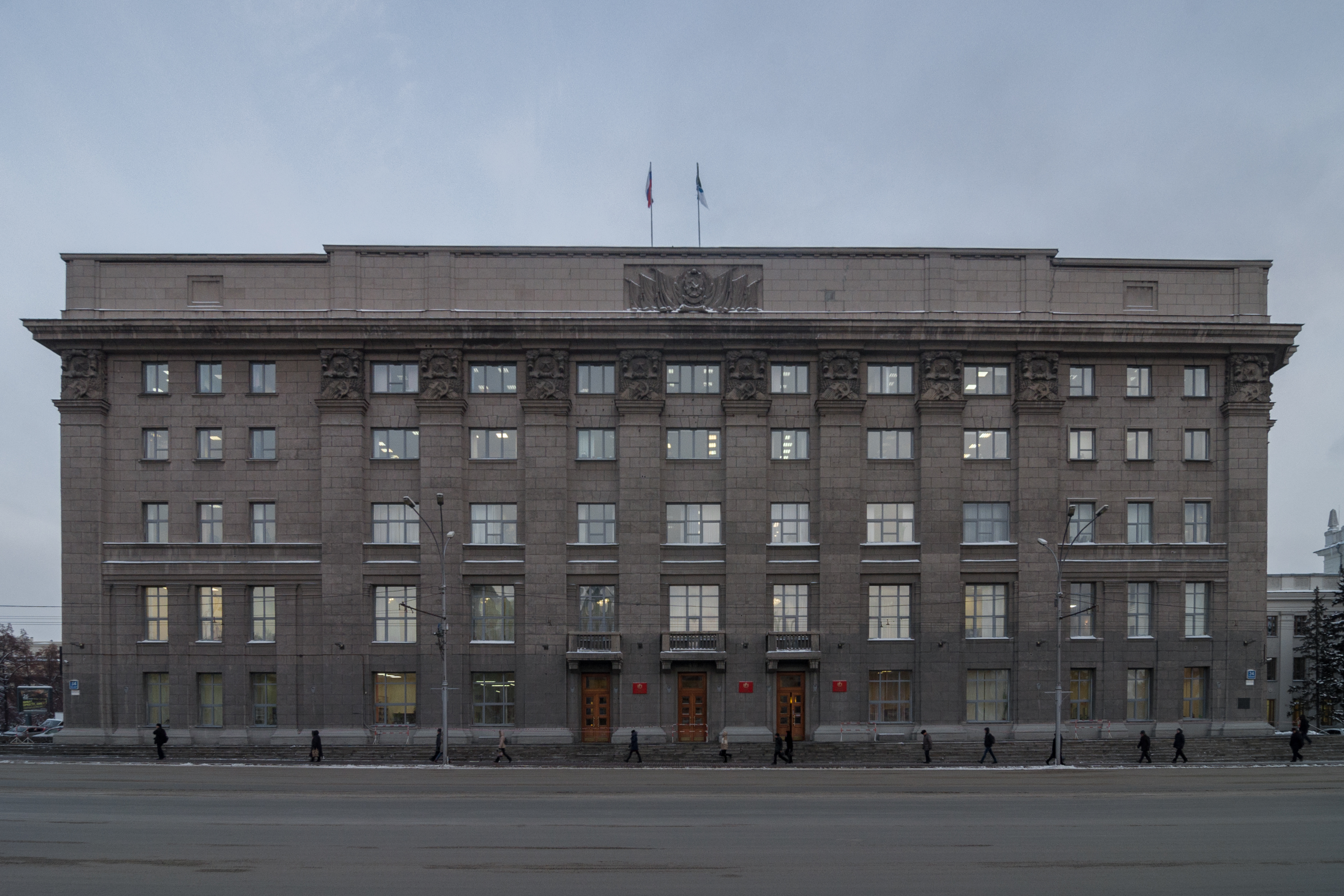
Prombank

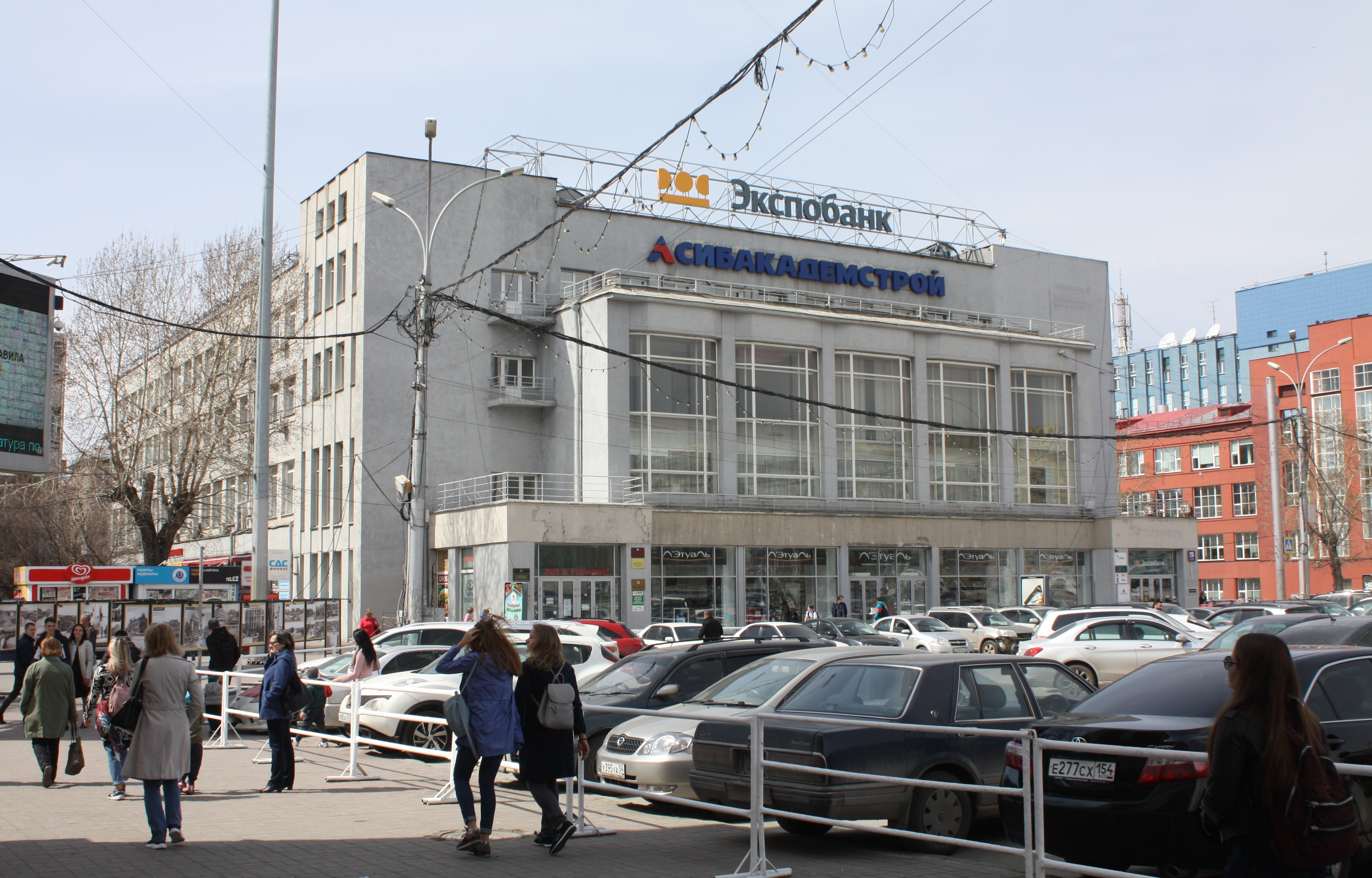
Business House

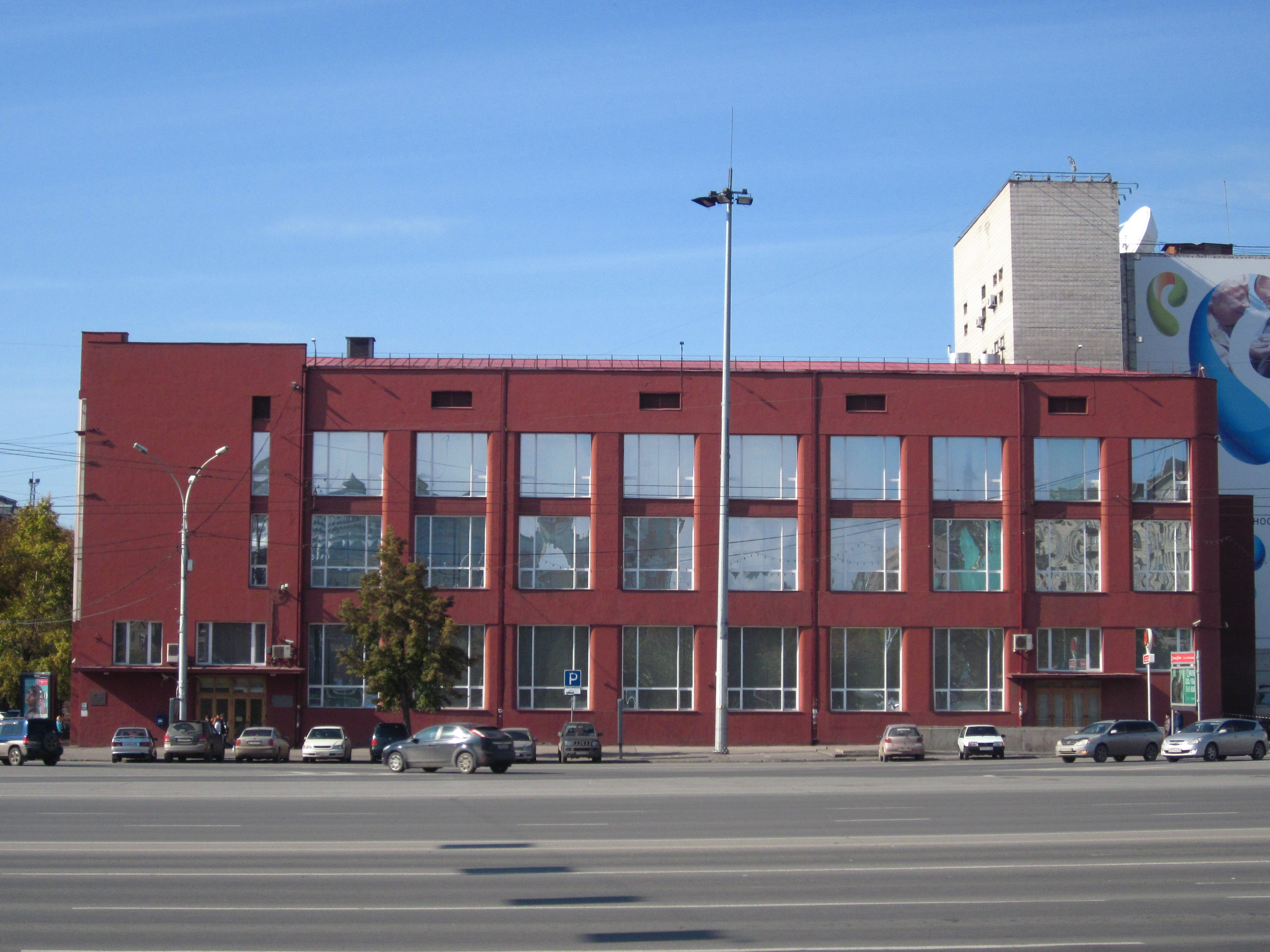
Gosbank Building

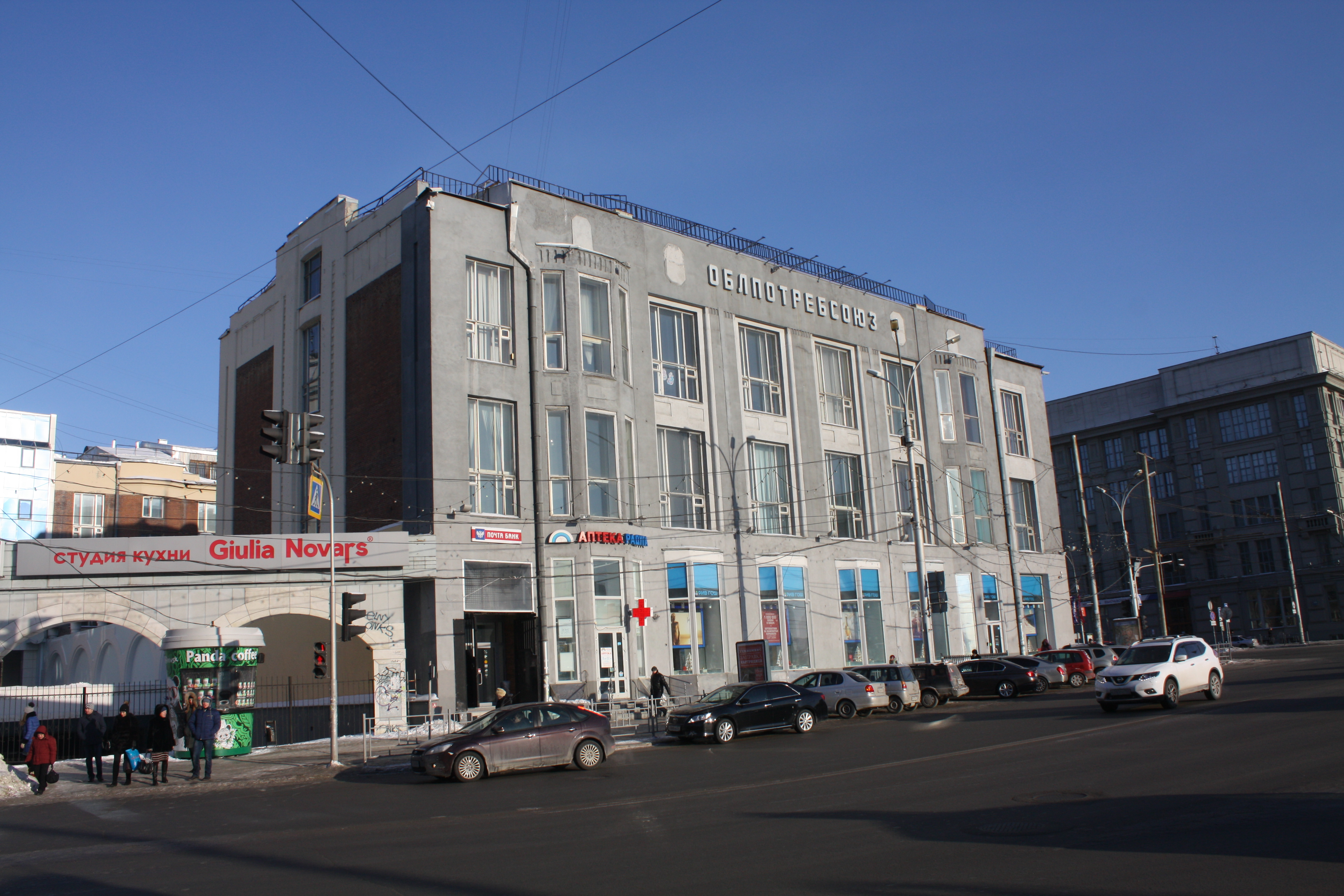
Oblpotrebsoyuz Building

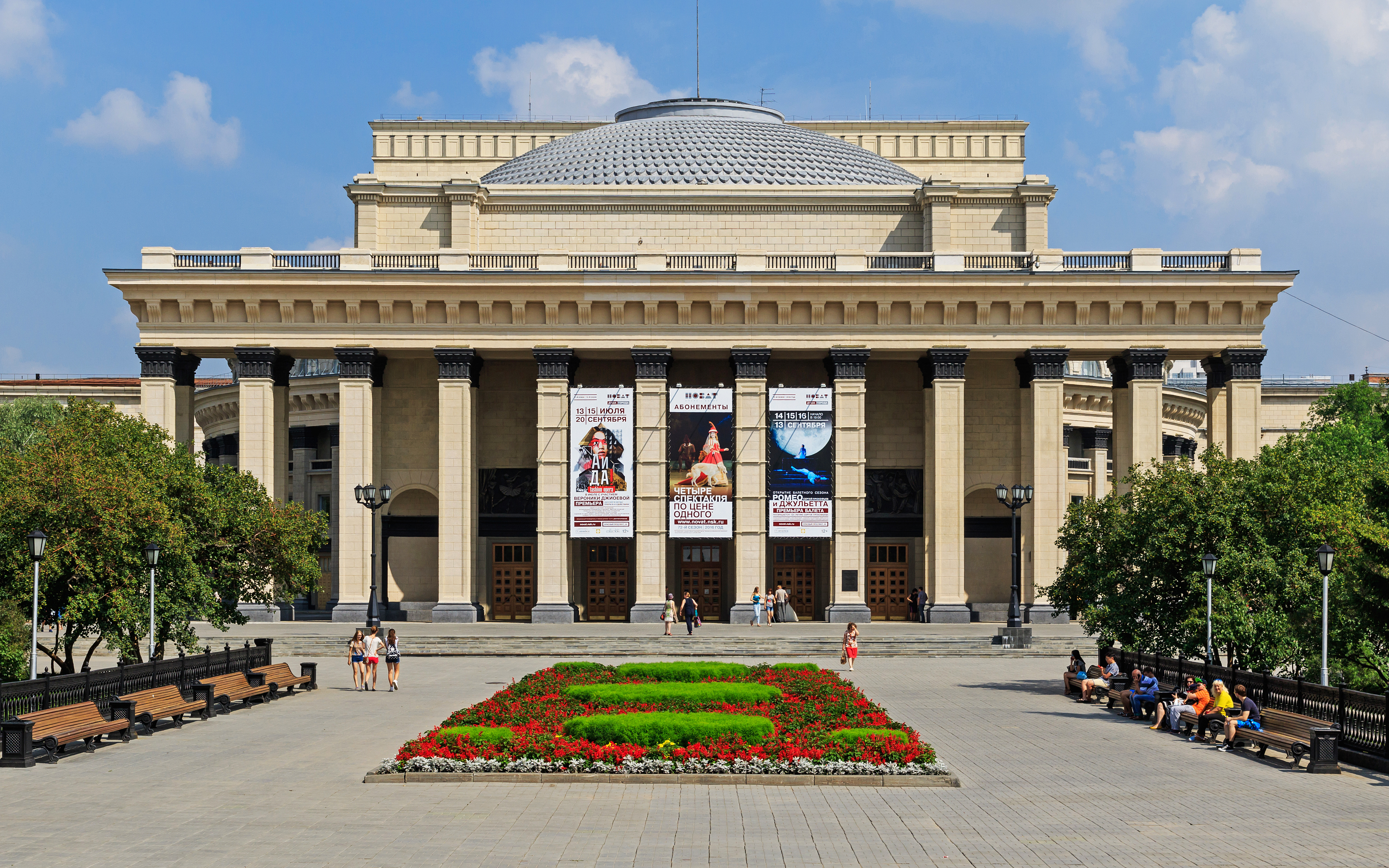
Novosibirsk Opera and Ballet Theatre
