= Building of State Institutions =

Building used by Novosibirsk State University of Architecture, Design, and Arts

- Здание Госучреждений
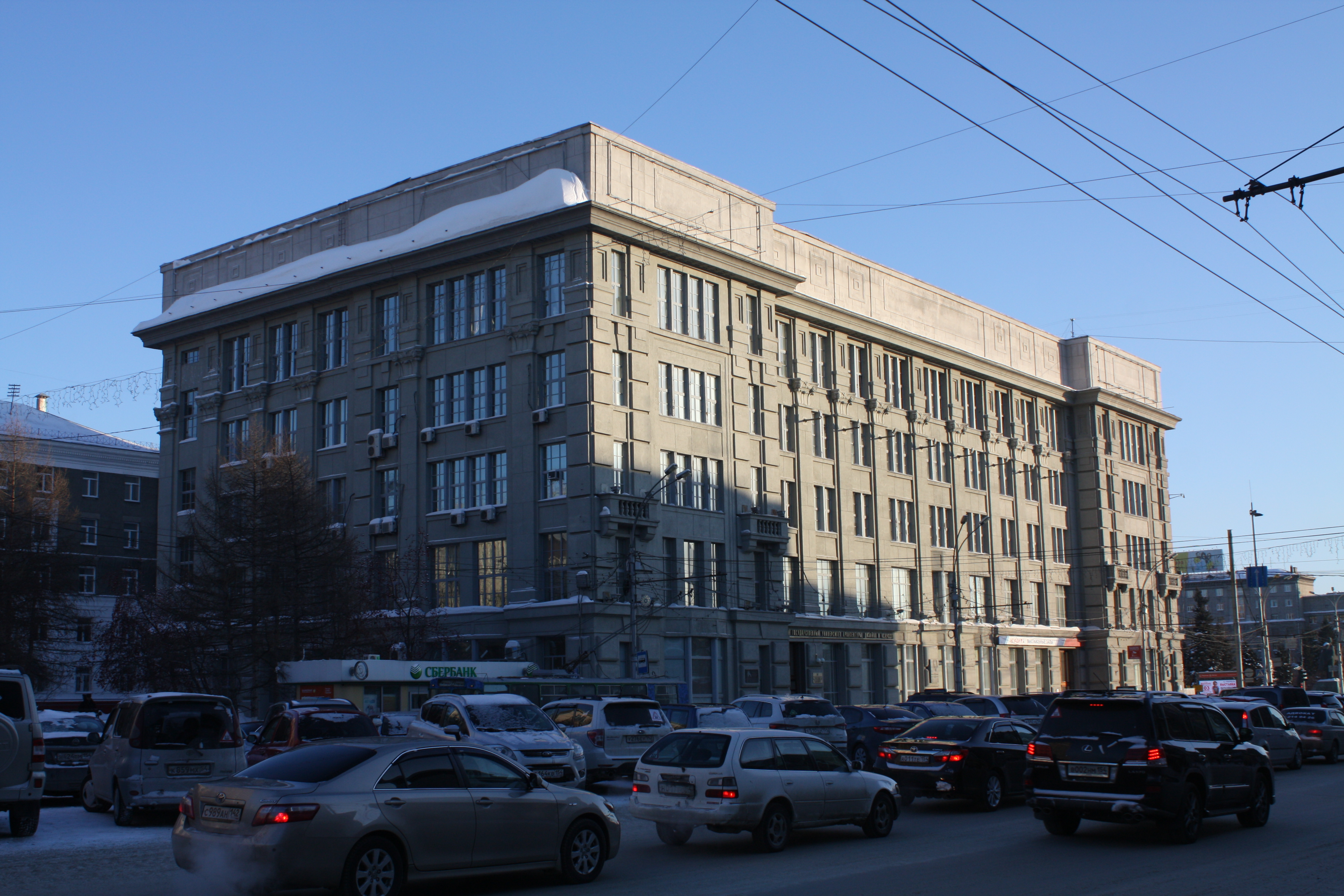

General information
- Location: Krasny Prospekt 38, Novosibirsk, Russia
- Coordinates: 55.03146°N 82.92073°E
- Completed: 1925

Design and construction
- Architects: A. D. Kryachkov; S. I. Ignatovich

Building of State Institutions (Russian: Здание Госучреждений) is a building in Tsentralny District of Novosibirsk, Russia. It is located on the corner of Krasny Prospekt and Ordzhonikidze Street. The building was built in 1924–1925 by architect Andrey Kryachkov. In the 1930s, it was reconstructed by S. I. Ignatovich.

The building is a part of the architectural ensemble of Lenin Square.

== History ==
The building originally had two floors. In the 1930s, it had been increased to five stories.

During World War II, the building was occupied by Hospital No. 1504.

Since the 1990s, the building has been occupied by Novosibirsk State University of Architecture, Design and Arts.

== Gallery ==
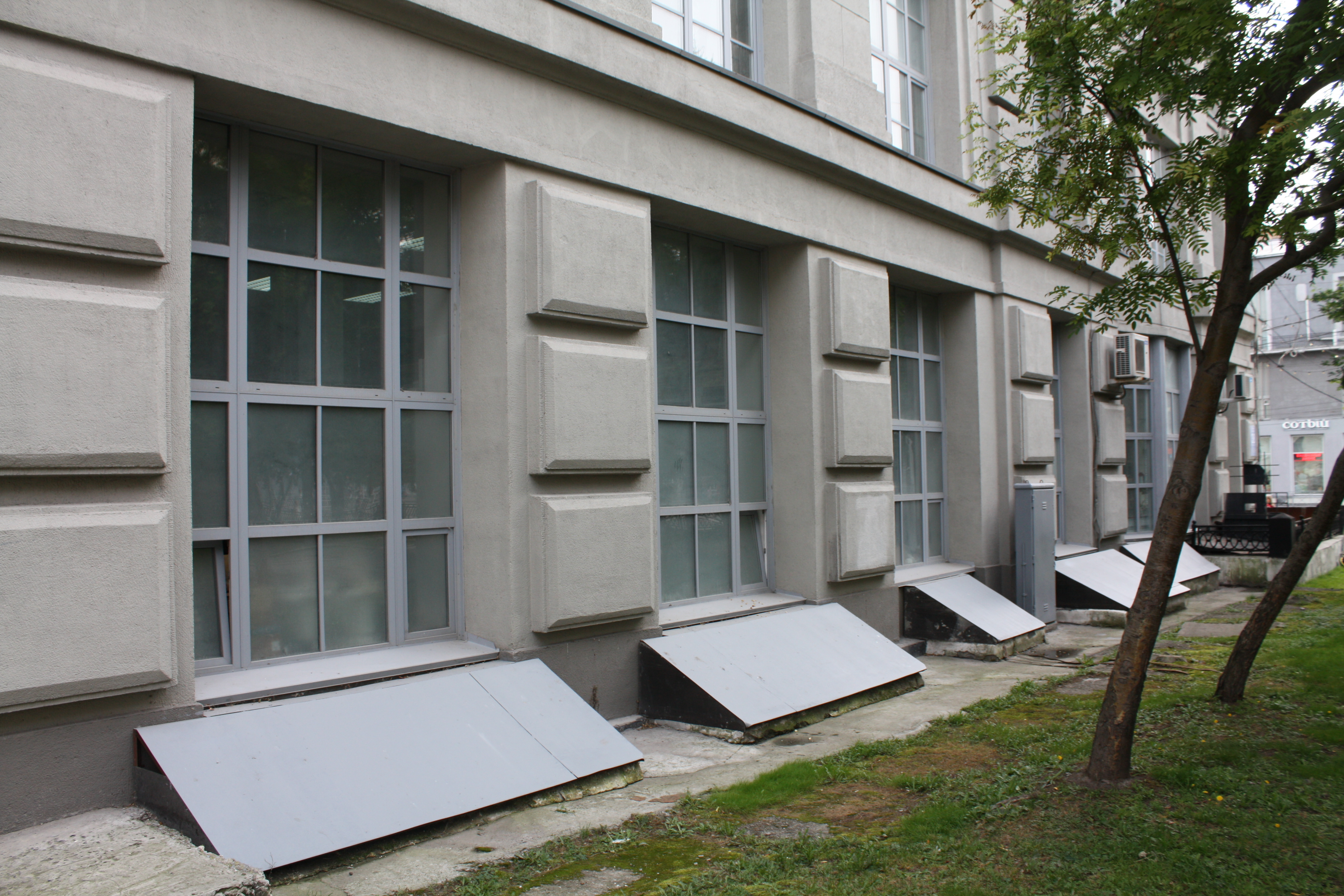

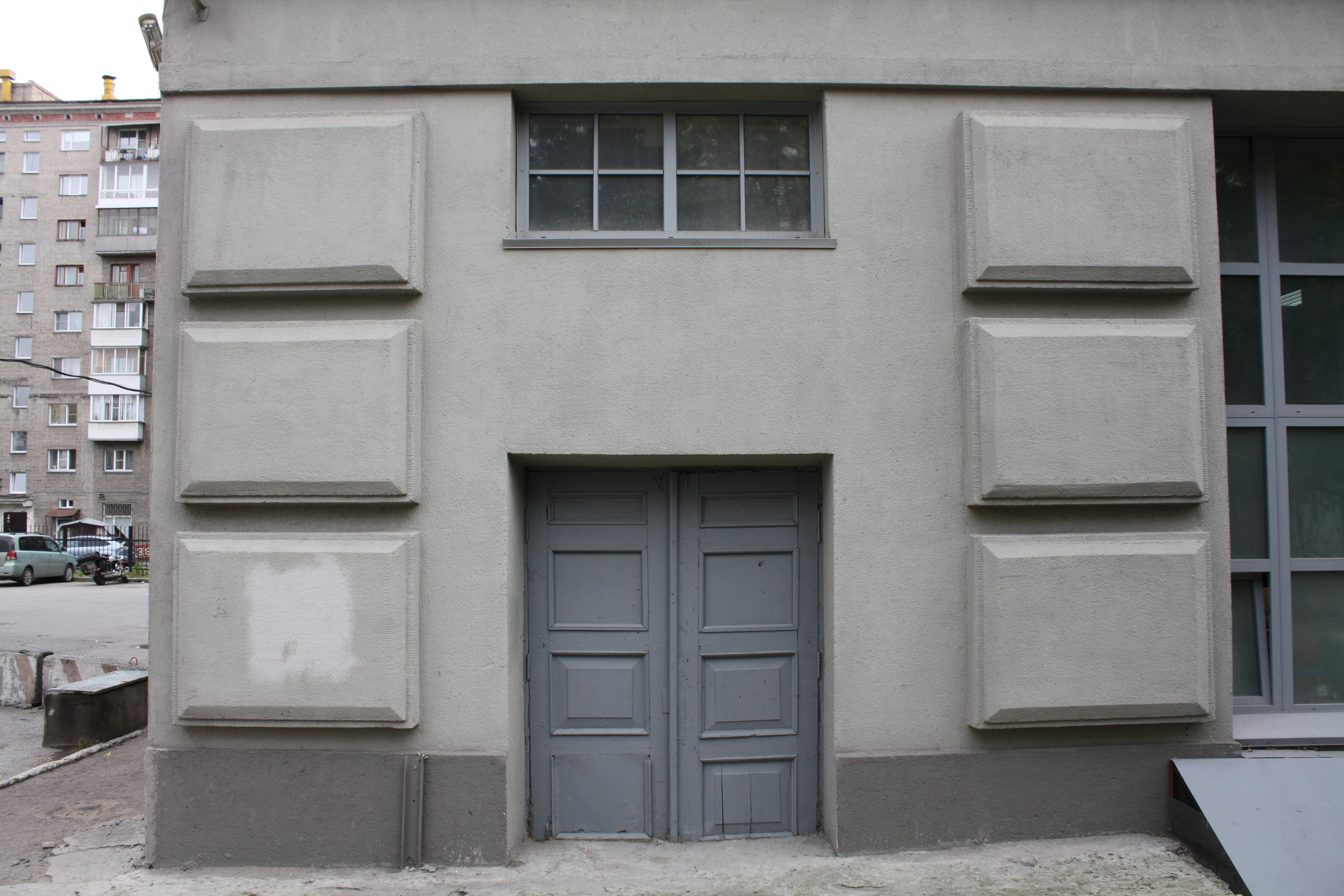

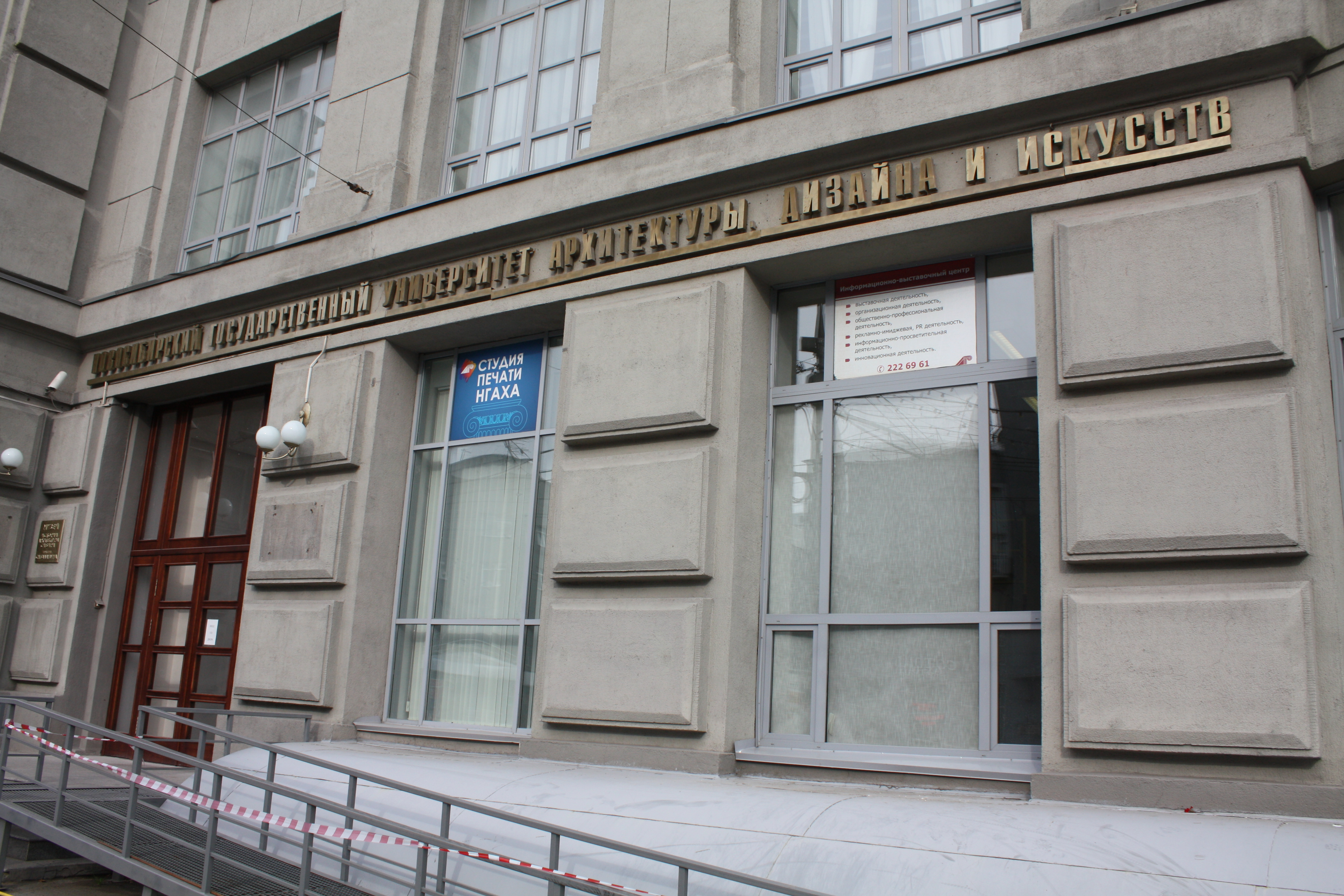

== See also ==
- Oblpotrebsoyuz Building
- Business House
- Gosbank Building
