= Ordzhonikidze Street, Novosibirsk =

Street in Novosibirsk, Russia

Ordzhonikidze Street
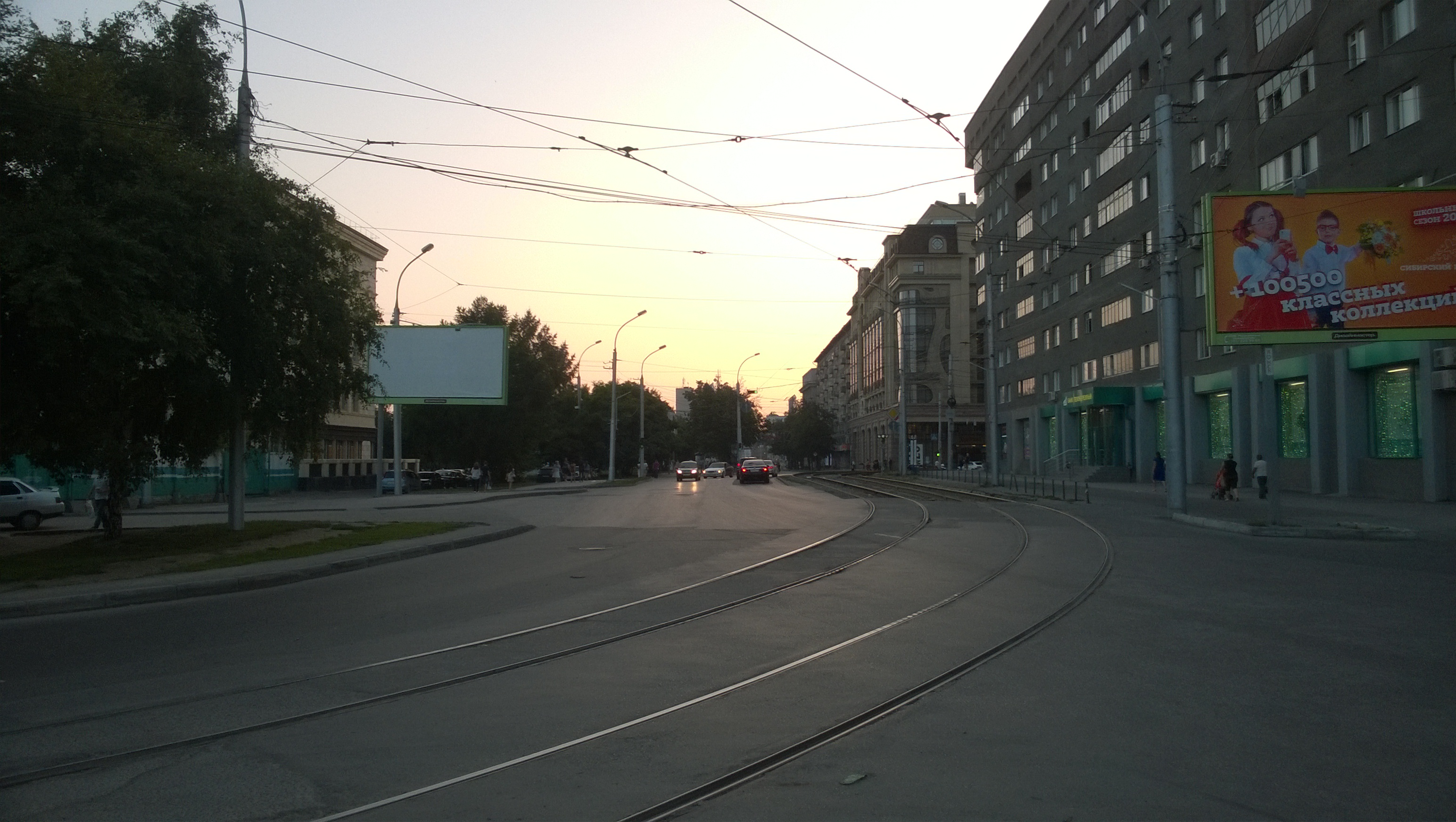
- Interactive map of Ordzhonikidze Street
- Native name: Улица Орджоникидзе (Russian)
- Location: Novosibirsk; Russia

Ordzhonikidze Street (Russian: Улица Орджоникидзе) is a street in Tsentralny City District of Novosibirsk, Russia. The street runs from the intersection with Vokzalnaya Magistral and Sovetskaya Street, crosses Krasny Avenue, Kamenskaya, Shamshin Family streets and connects with Trudovaya Lane. In addition, Trudovaya, Michurin and Voyennaya streets adjacent to the street. The street forms the north side of Lenin Square, the main square of Novosibirsk.

== History ==
The street was previously called the Semipalatinskaya Street, but was renamed in 1937.

== Architecture ==
=== Soviet architecture ===
- Building of State Institutions is a building on the corner of Krasny Avenue and Ordzhonikidze Street. It was built in 1925. Architect: Andrey Kryachkov.
- Oblpotrebsoyuz Building (or Sibkraisoyuz Building) is a building on the corner of Krasny Avenue and Ordzhonikidze Street. It was built in 1926. Architect: Andrey Kryachkov
- Novosibirsk Opera and Ballet Theatre is the largest theatre in Russia. It was built in 1944.

=== Post-Soviet architecture ===
- Bulgarian House. The building was built in 2001.
- Novosibirsk Marriott Hotel. It is located on the corner of Michurin and Ordzhonikidze streets. The hotel was opened in 2014.
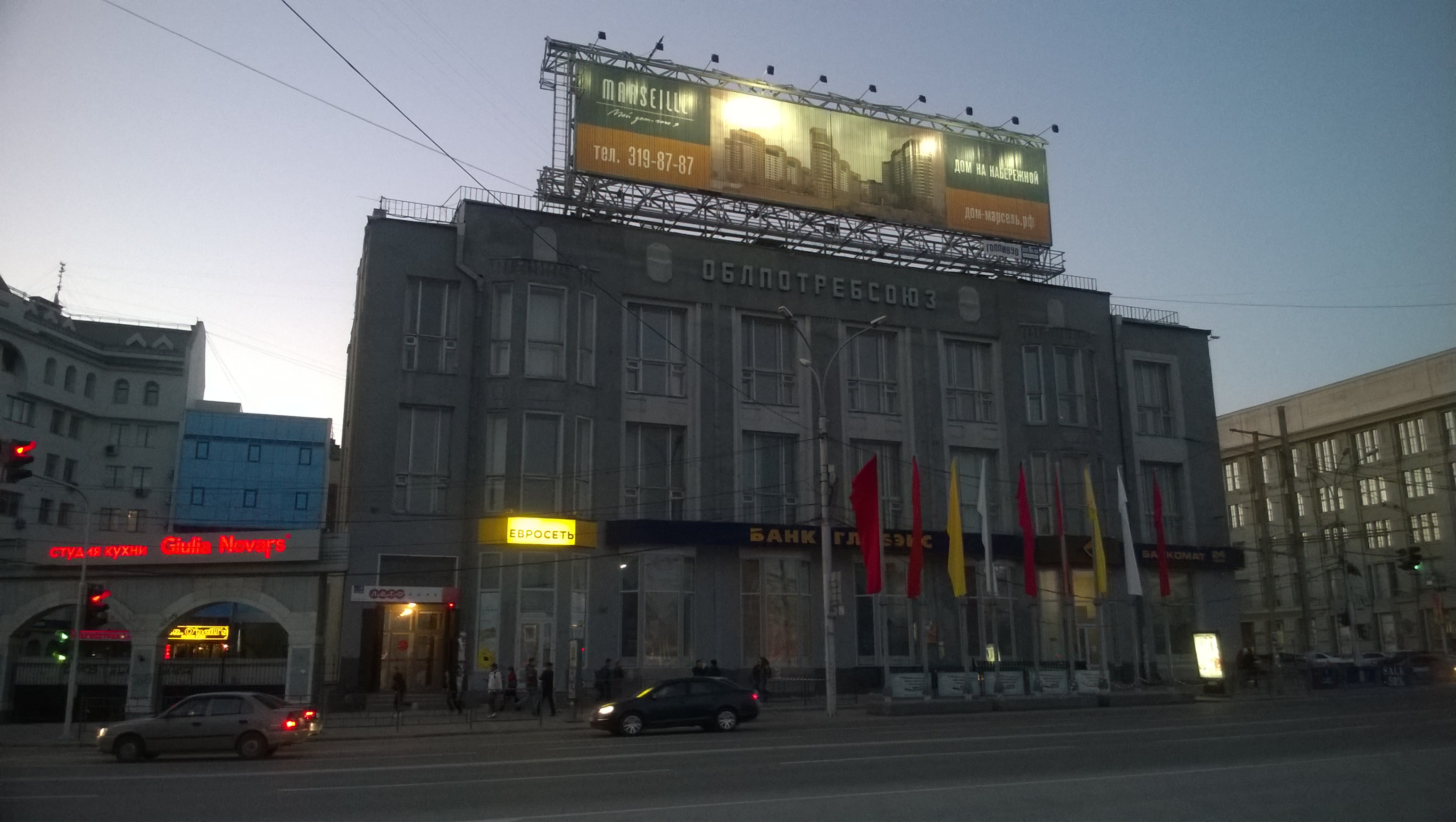
Oblpotrebsoyuz Building

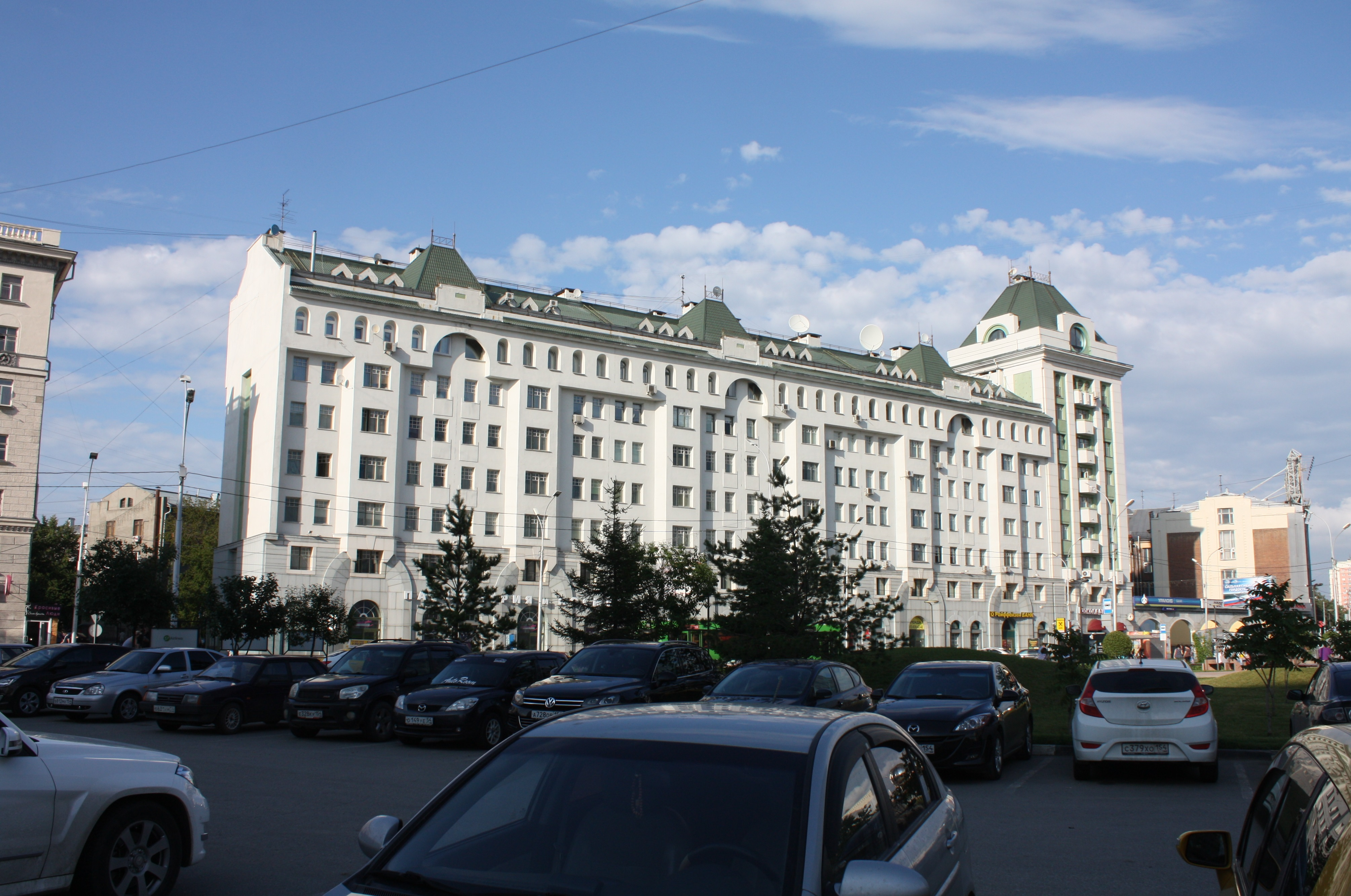
Bulgarian House

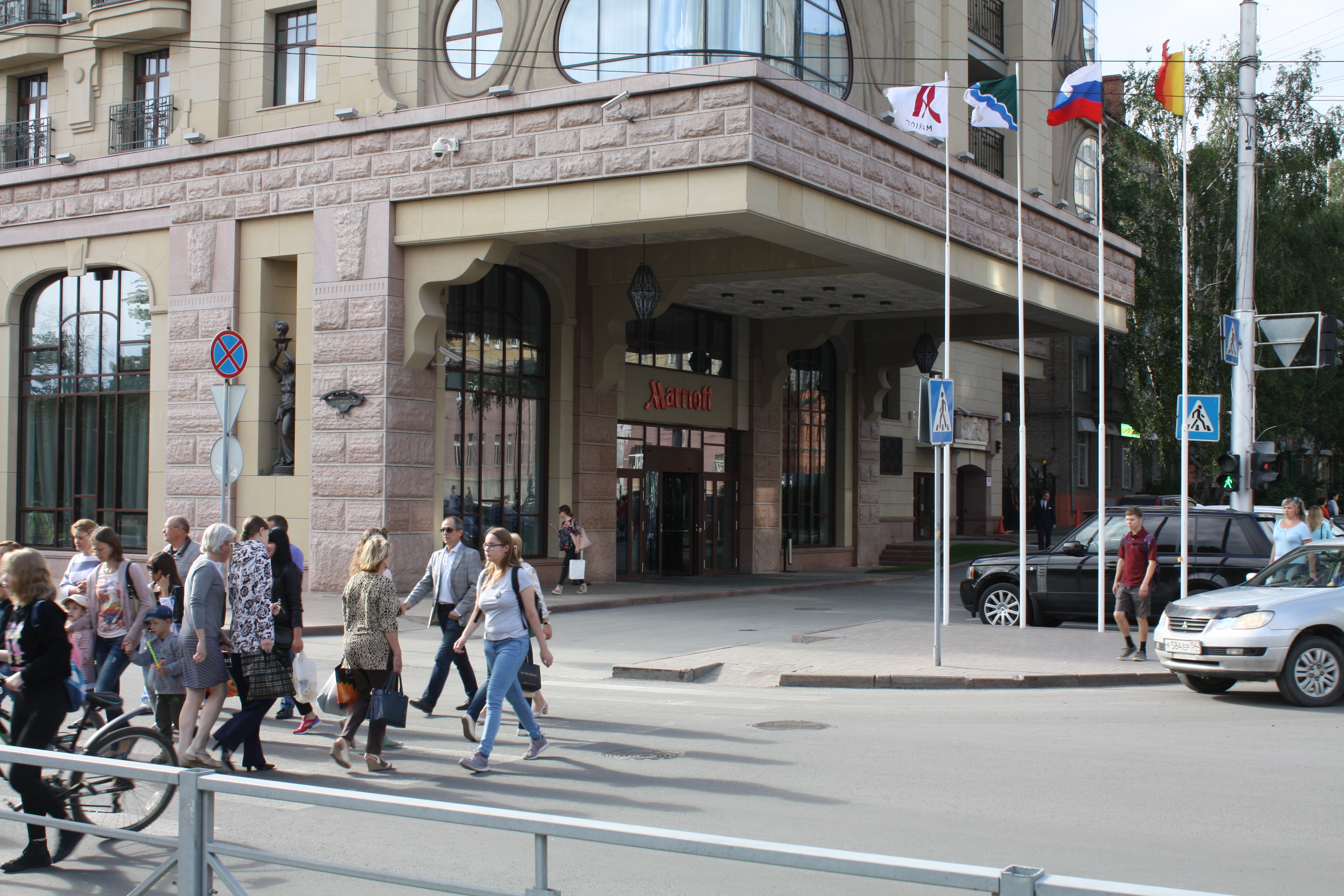
Novosibirsk Marriott Hotel on the corner of Michurin and Ordzhonikidze streets

== Gallery ==
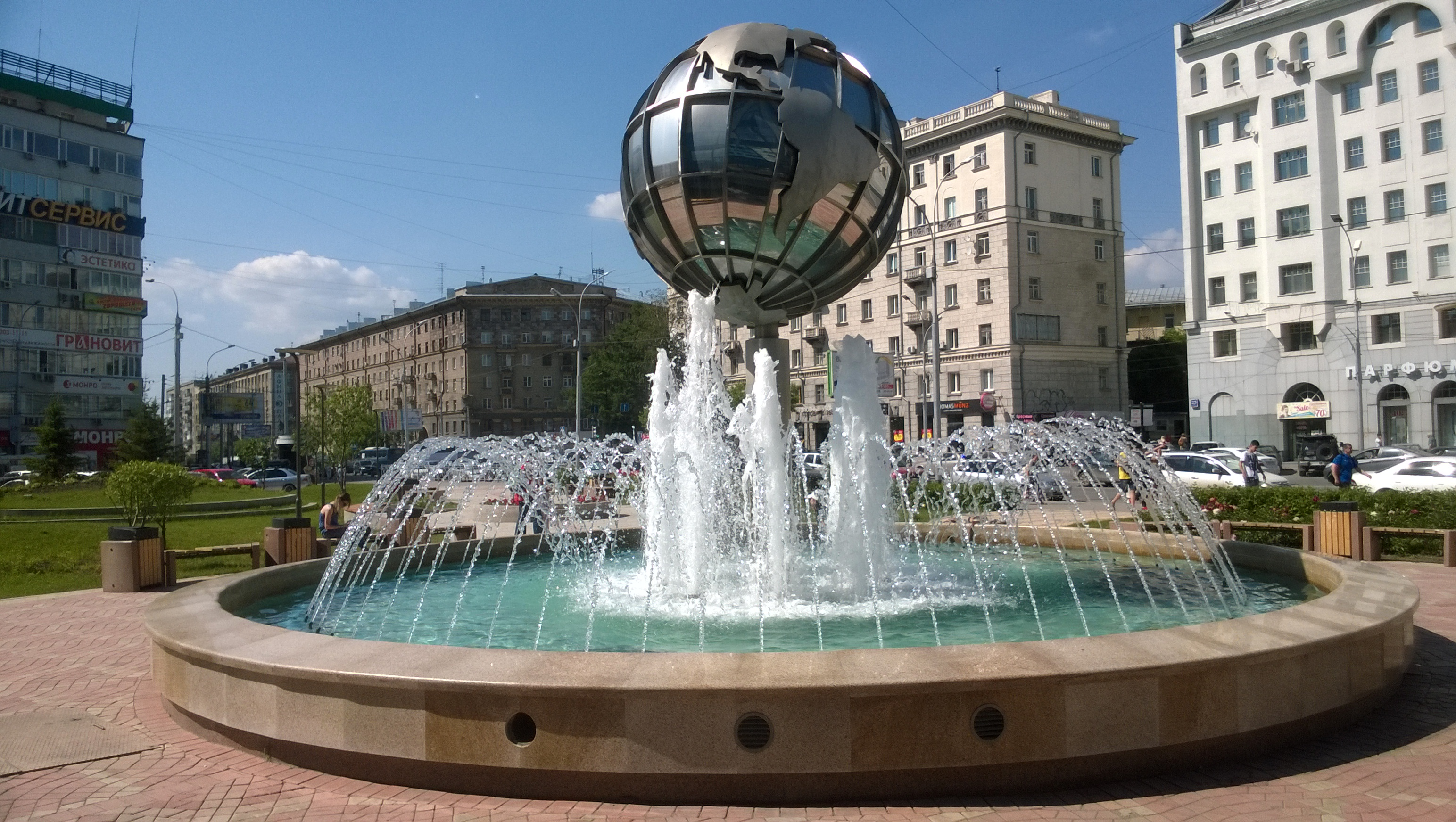

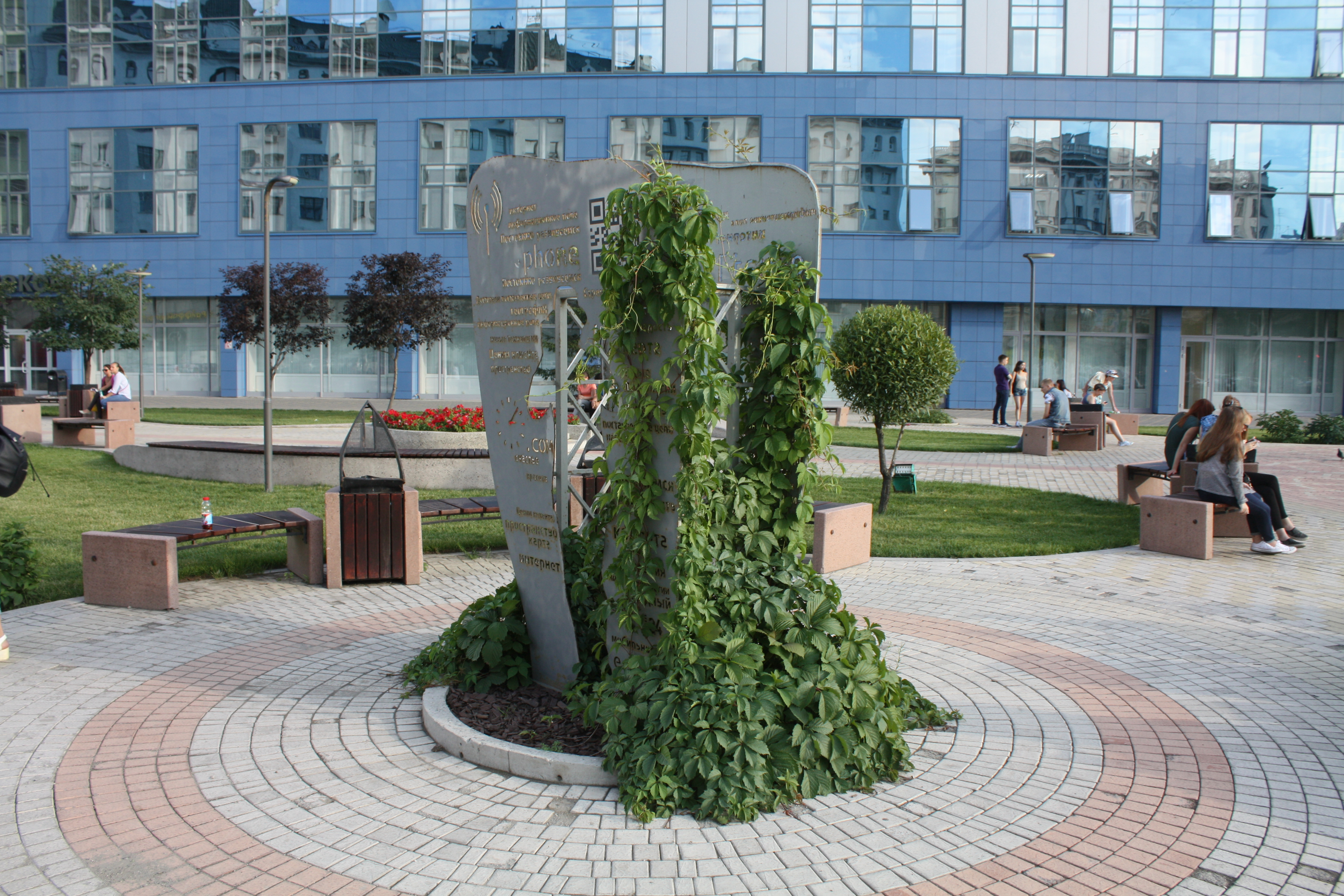

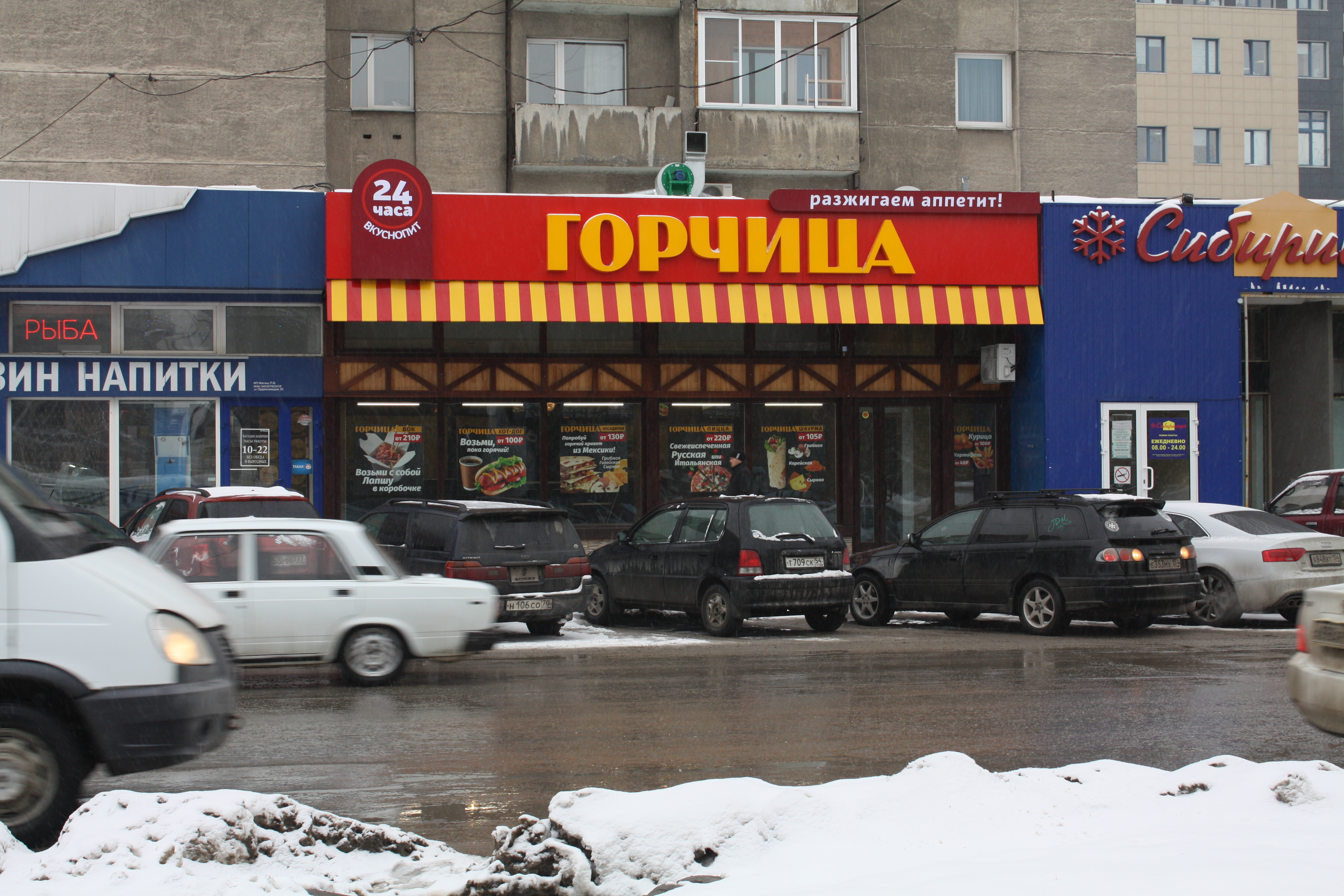

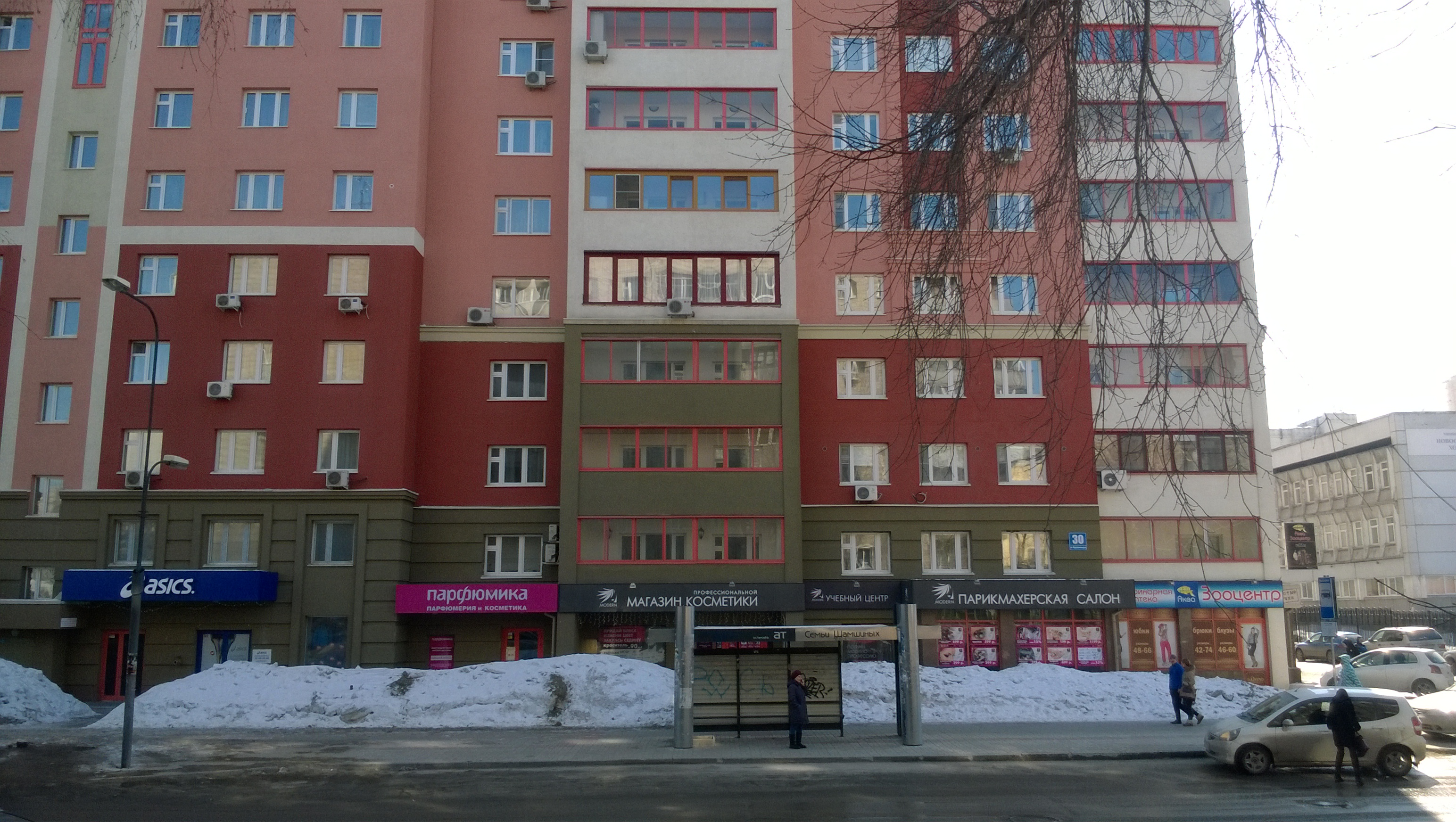

== Transportation ==
=== Metro ===
Entrances of Ploshchad Lenina Station are located on Ordzhonikidze Street.

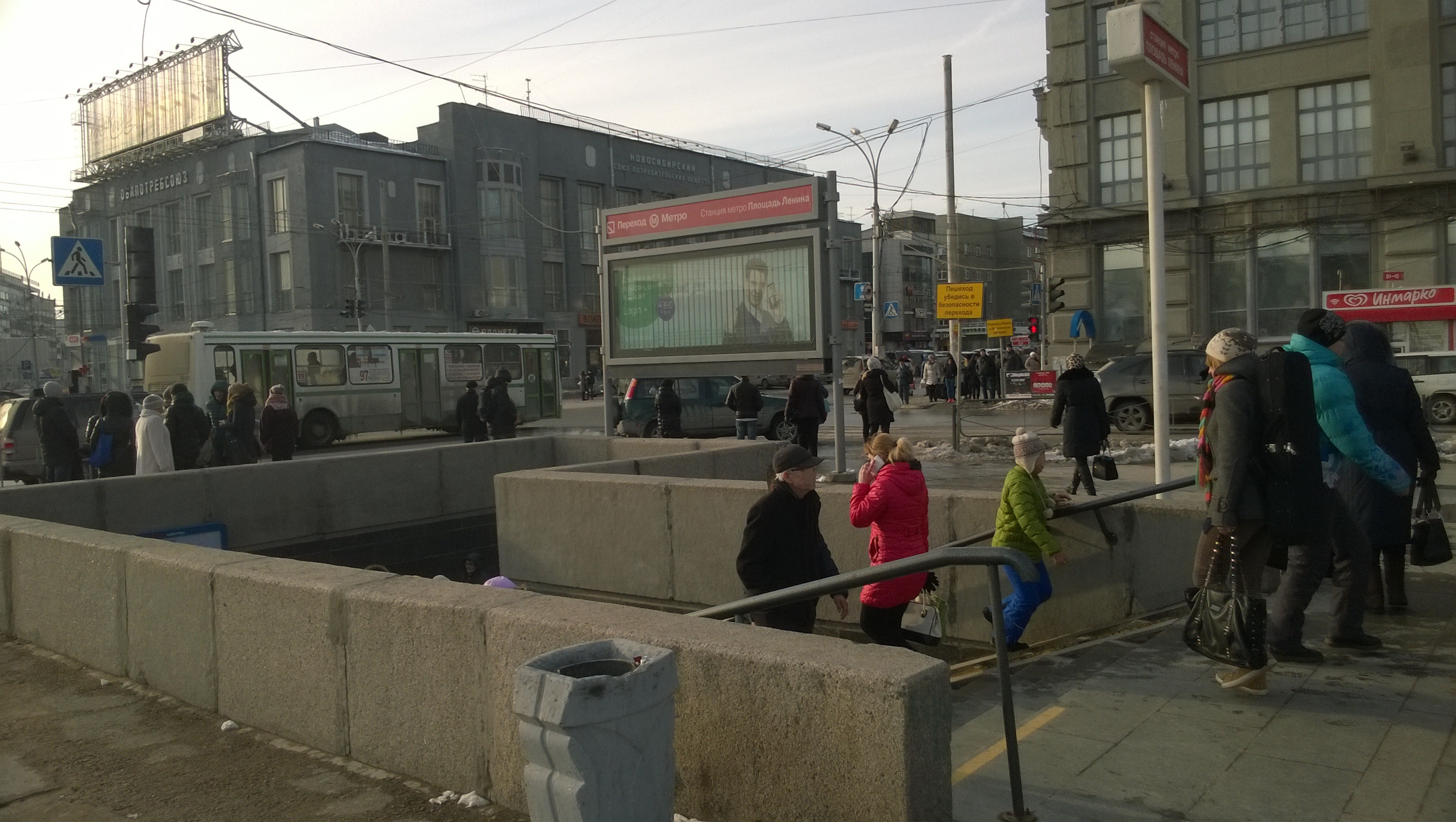

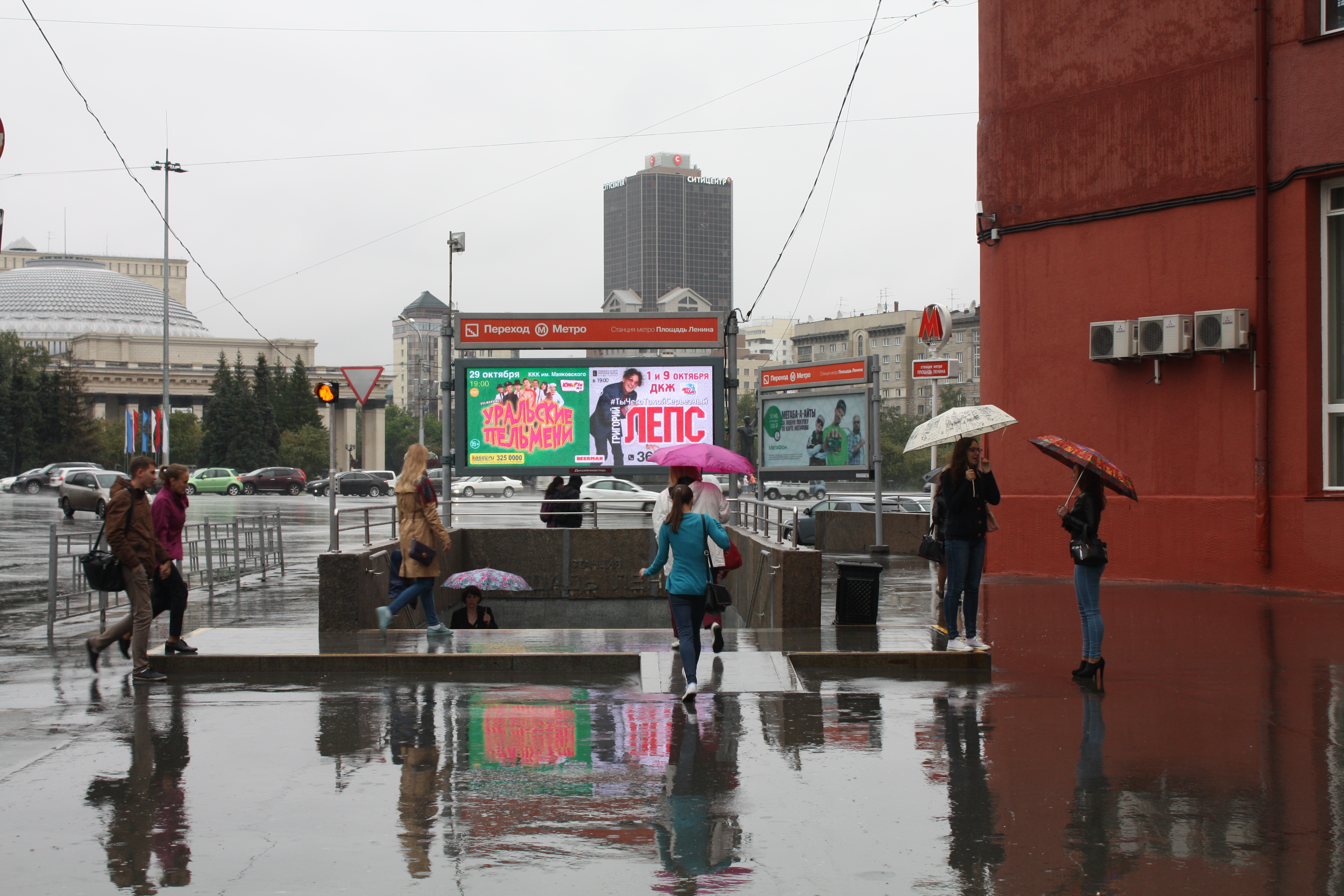
