= Oblpotrebsoyuz Building, Novosibirsk =

Oblpotrebsoyuz Building
- Здание Облпотребсоюза
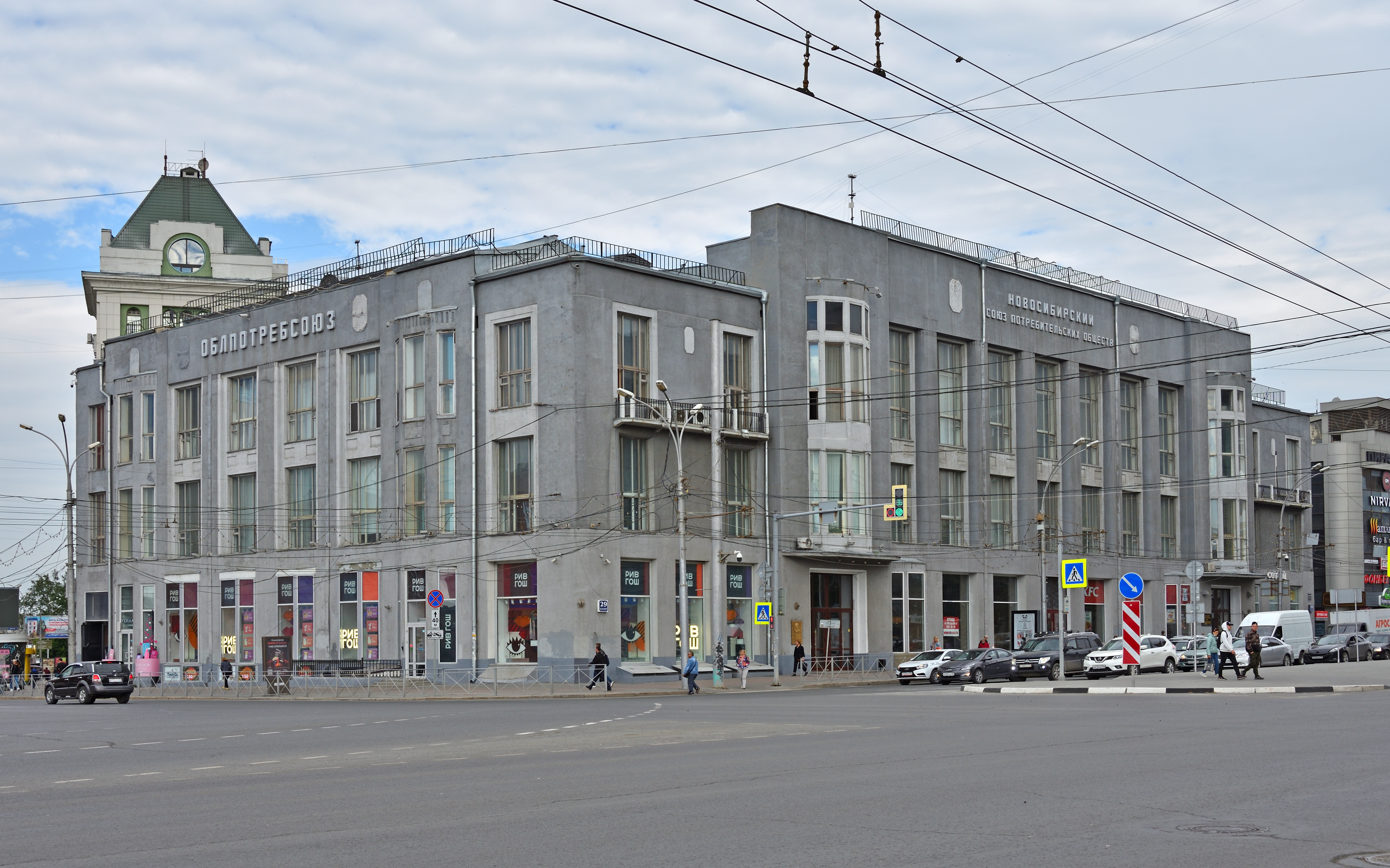
- Interactive map of the Oblpotrebsoyuz Building area

General information
- Location: Krasny Prospekt 29, Novosibirsk, Russia
- Coordinates: 55.031199°N 82.919506°E
- Completed: 1926

Design and construction
- Architect: Andrey Kryachkov

Oblpotrebsoyuz Building or Sibkraisoyuz Building (Russian: Здание Облпотребсоюза) is a building in Tsentralny District of Novosibirsk, Russia. It is located between Krasny Avenue, Ordzhonikidze and Trudovaya streets. The building was built in 1926 by architect Andrey Kryachkov.

The building is a part of the architectural ensemble of Lenin Square.

== History ==
From the late 1950s until 1997, part of the building was occupied by the bookshop ("The Central House of Book", Tsentralny Dom Knigi) with a department of foreign literature called "Druzhba" ("Friendship").

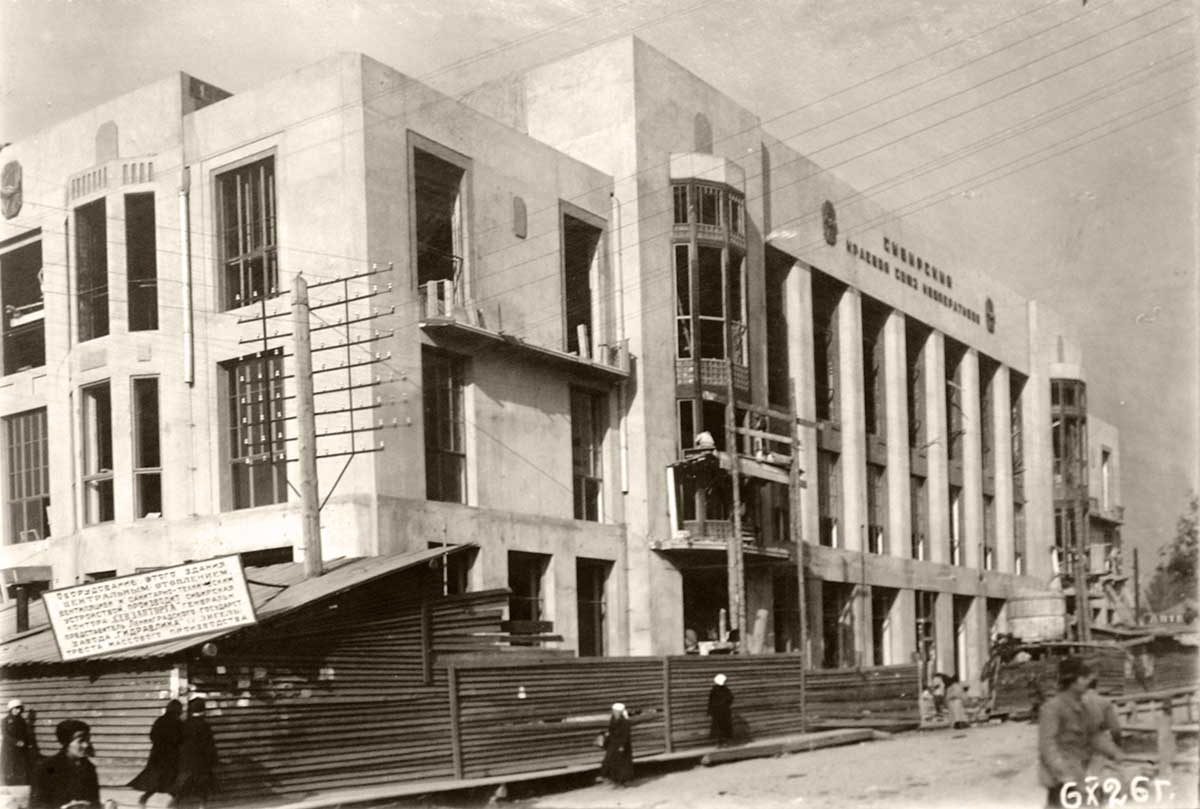
Construction of the building in 1926

== Gallery ==
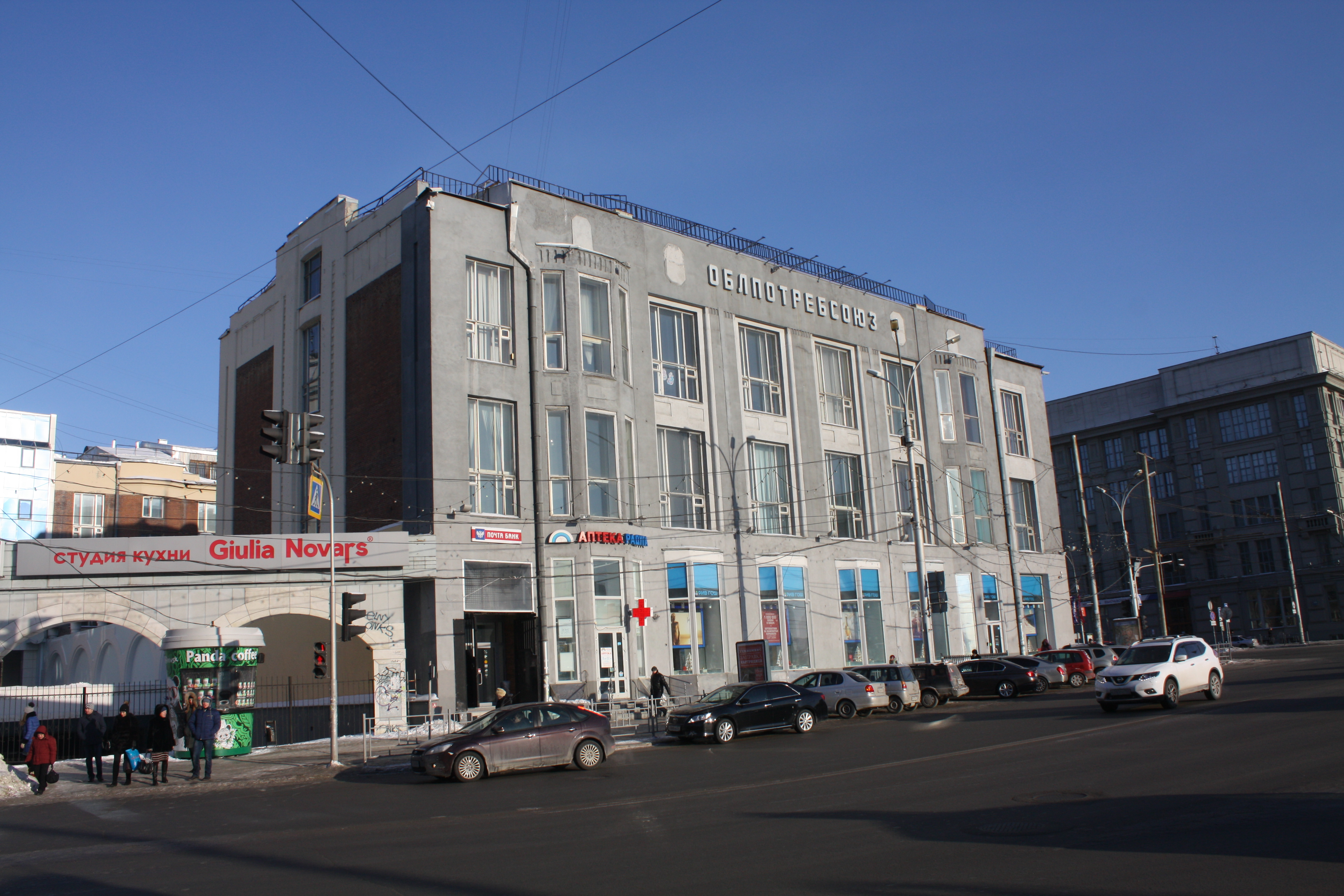

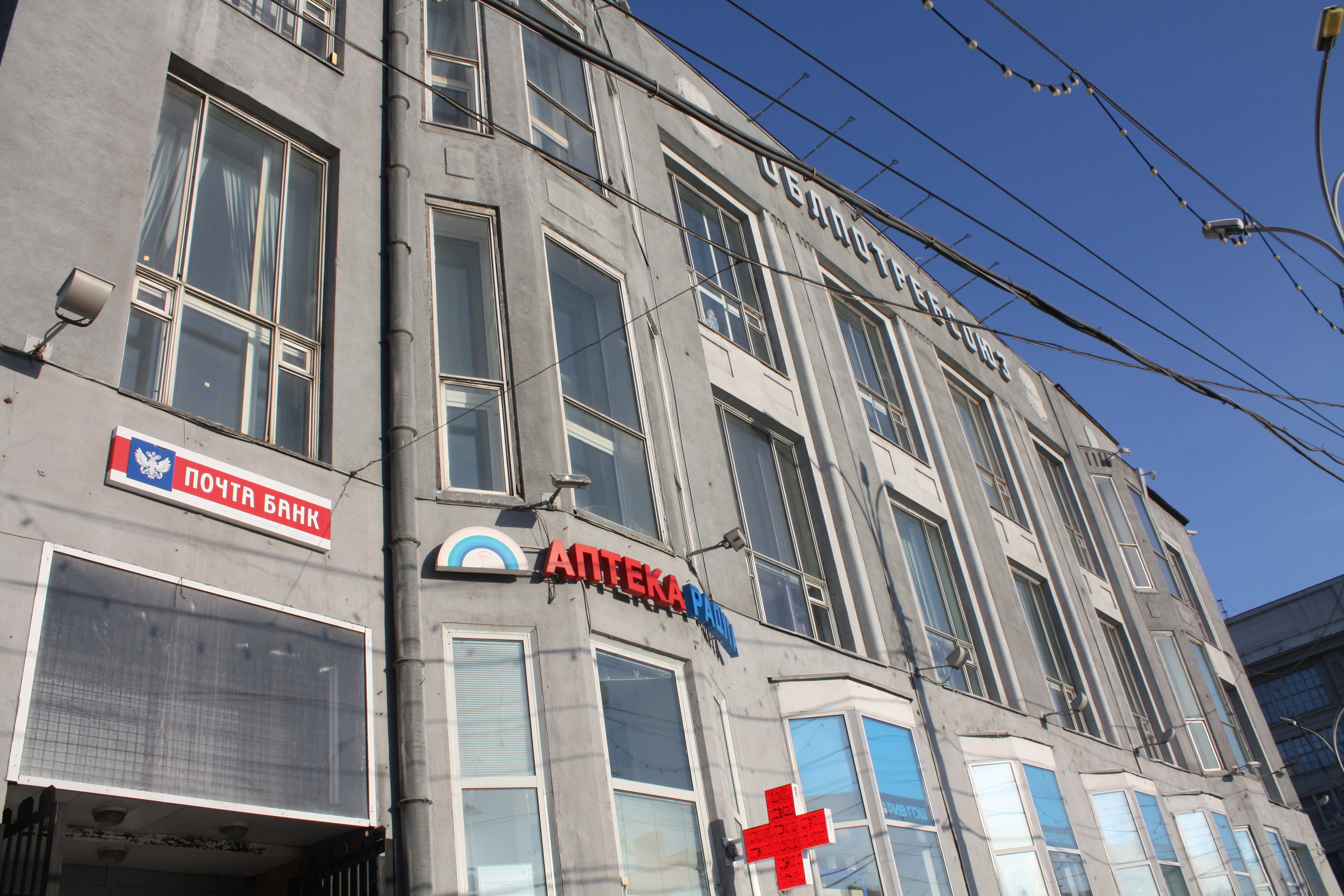

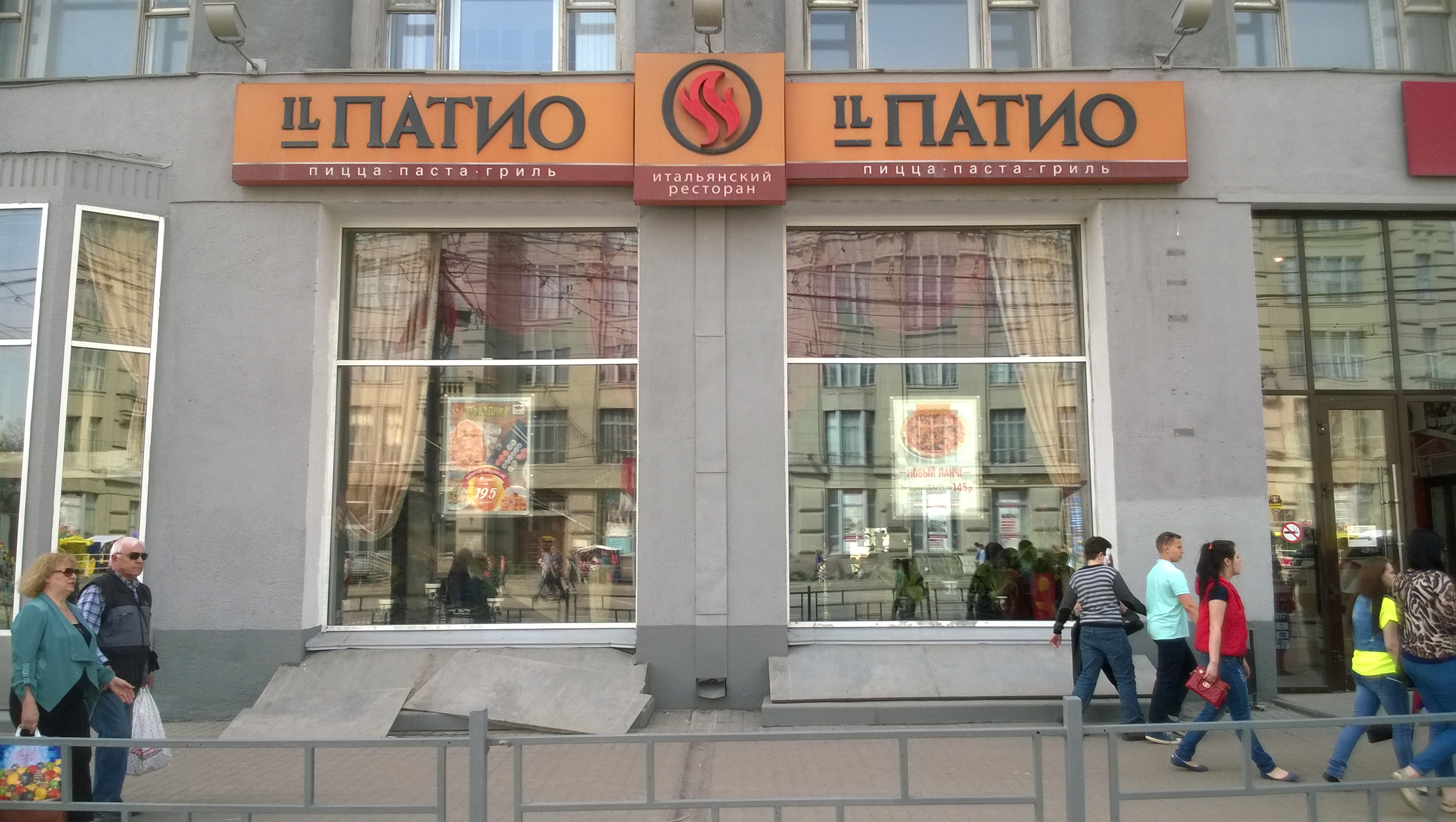

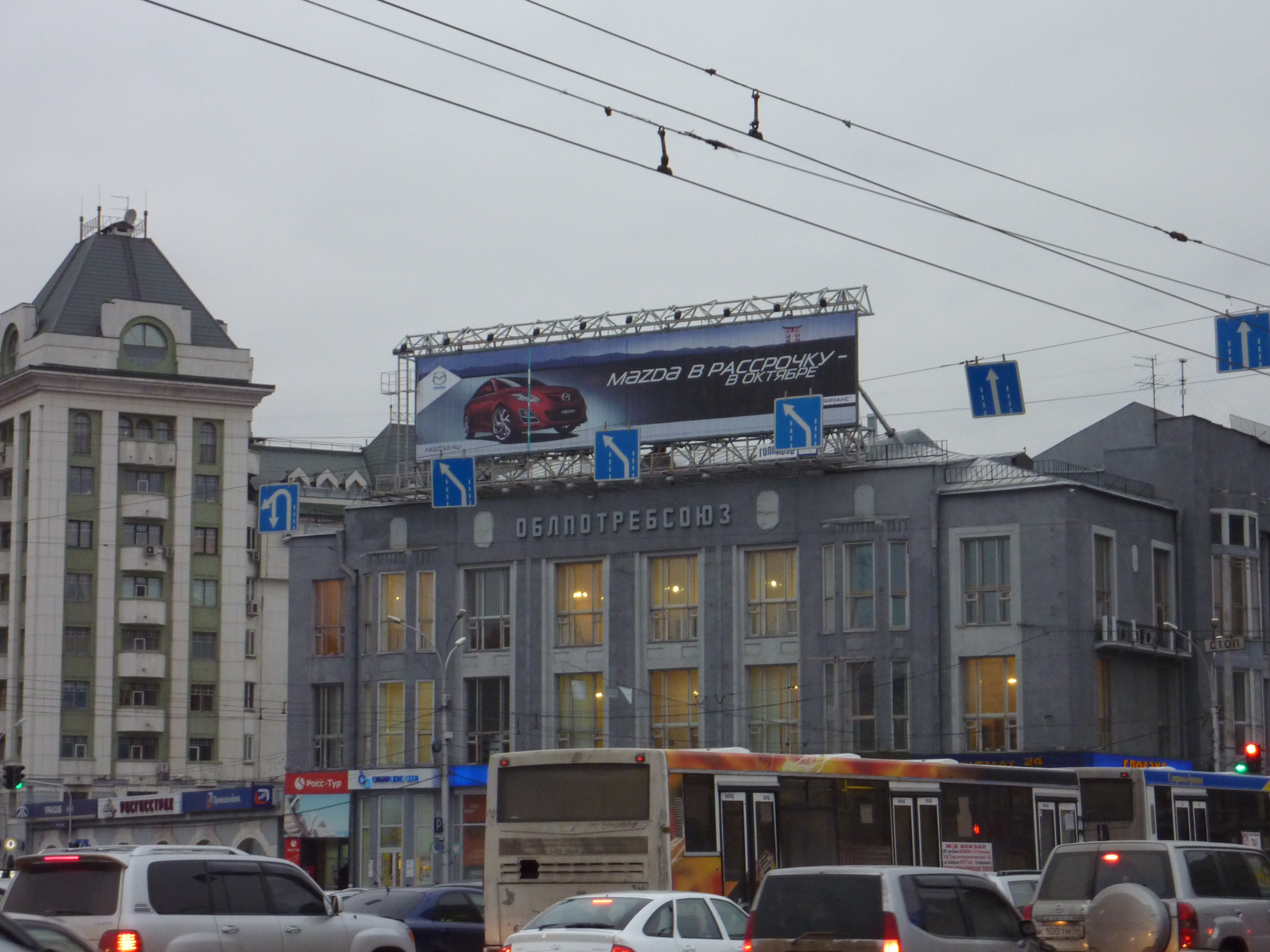

== See also ==
- Business House
- Gosbank Building
