= Business House, Novosibirsk =

Building in Novosibirsk, Russia

Business House
- Деловой дом
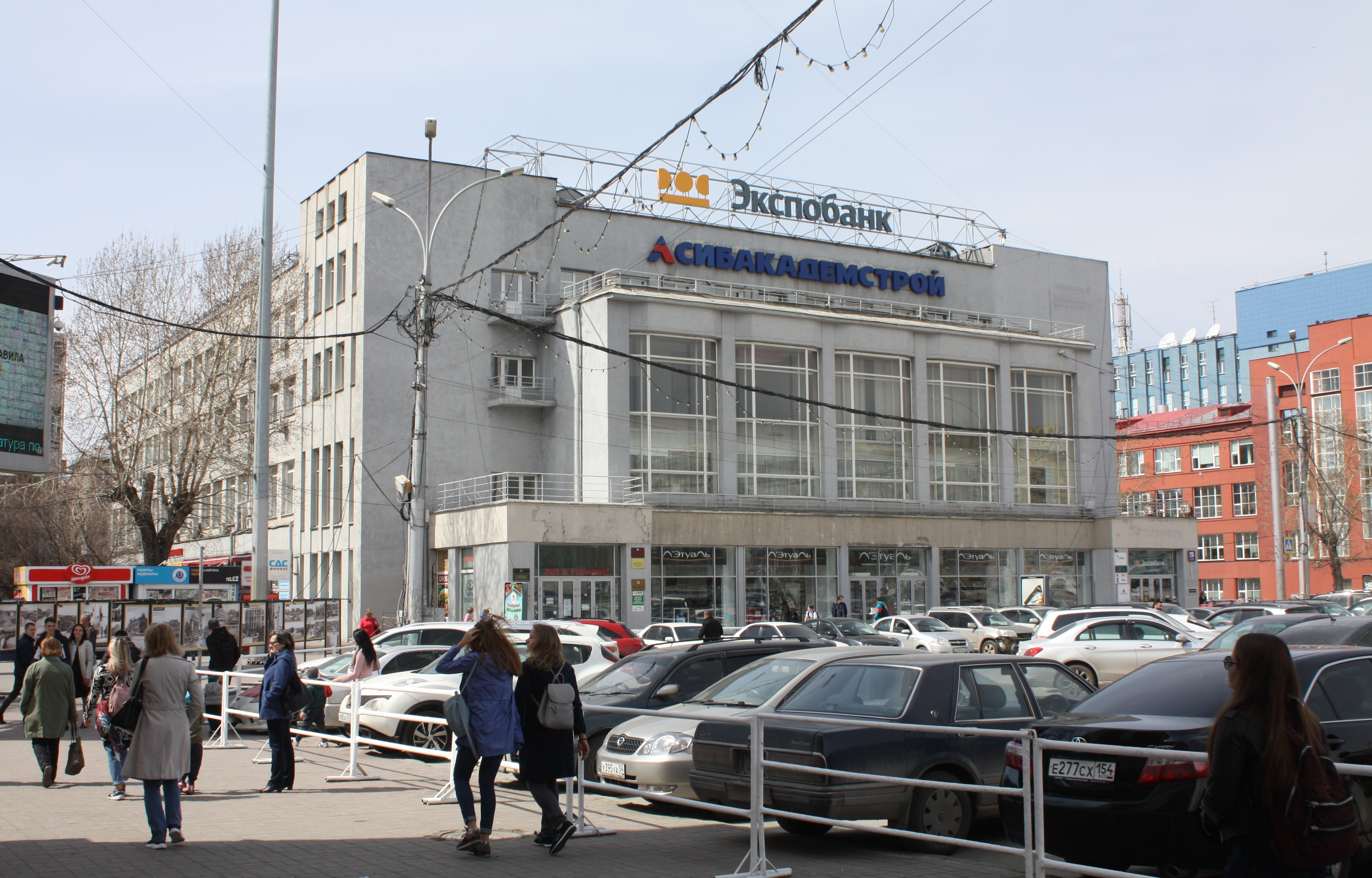
- Interactive map of the Business House area

General information
- Location: Novosibirsk, Russia
- Coordinates: 55.0289°N 82.9189°E
- Completed: 1928

Business House (Russian: Деловой дом) is a constructivist building in Tsentralny City District of Novosibirsk, Russia. It is located on the corner of Krasny Avenue and Lenin Street. The building is a part of the architectural ensemble of Lenin Square. It was built in 1928. Architects: D. F. Fridman, I. A. Burlakov.

== Gallery ==
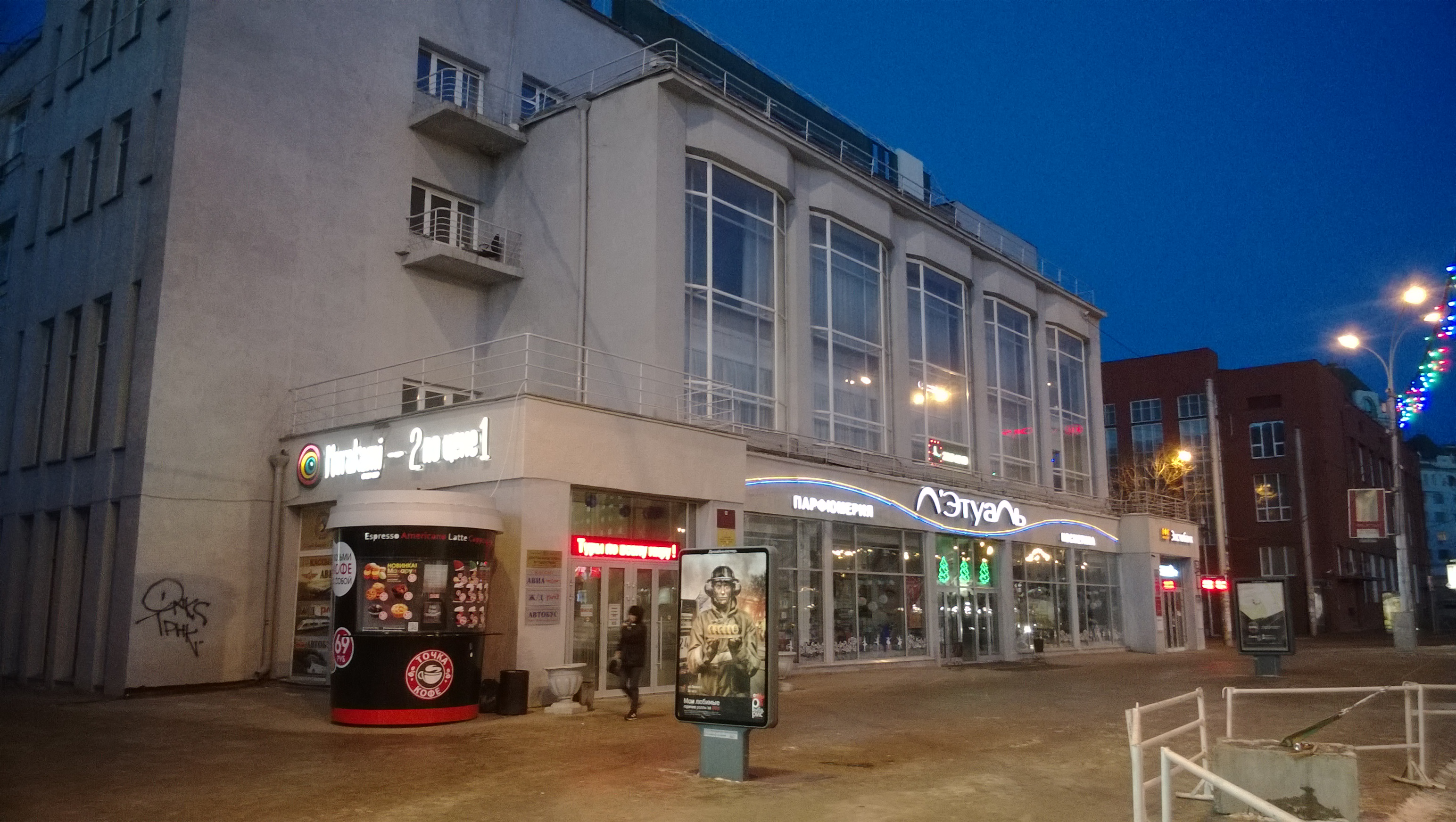

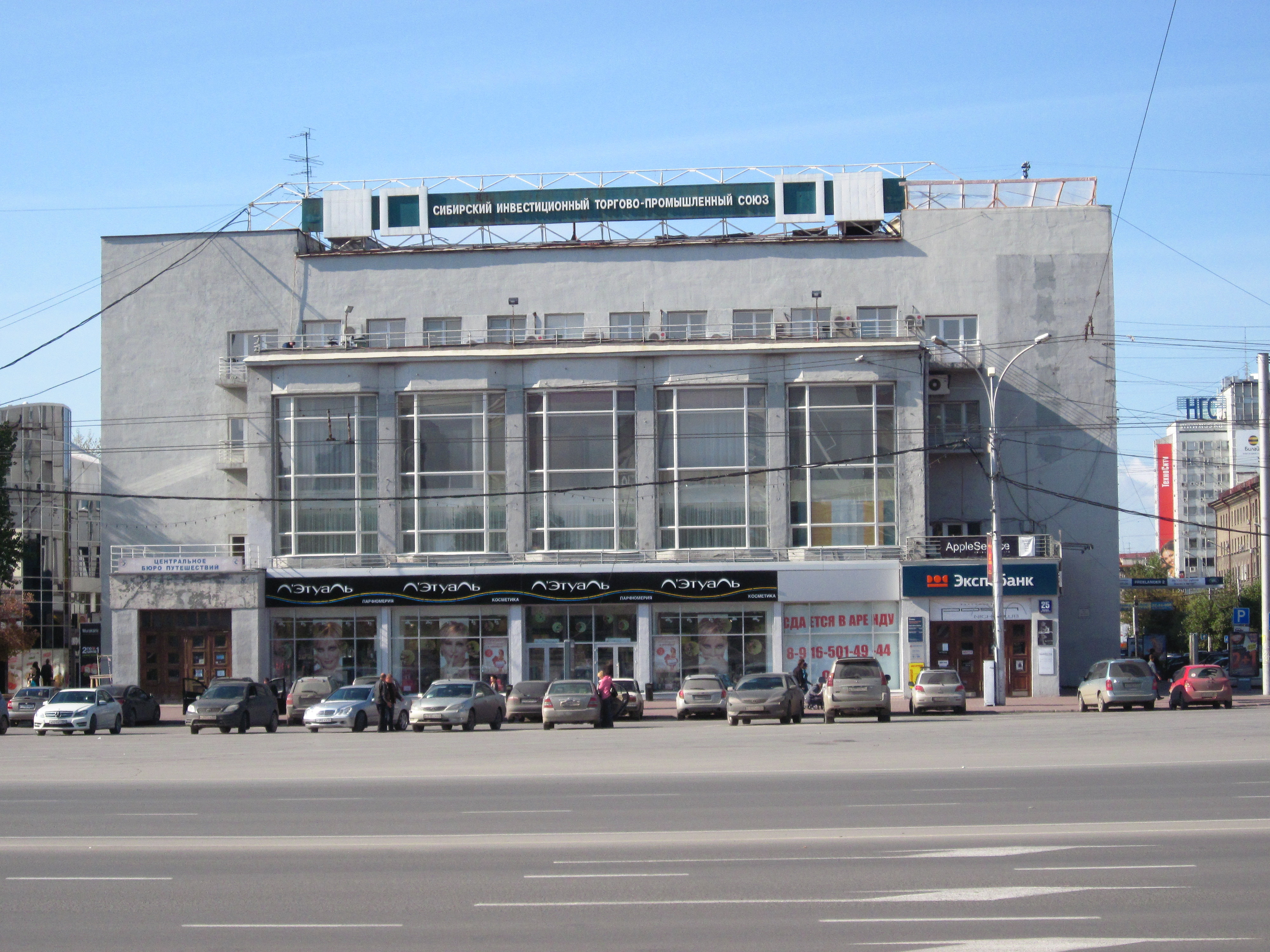

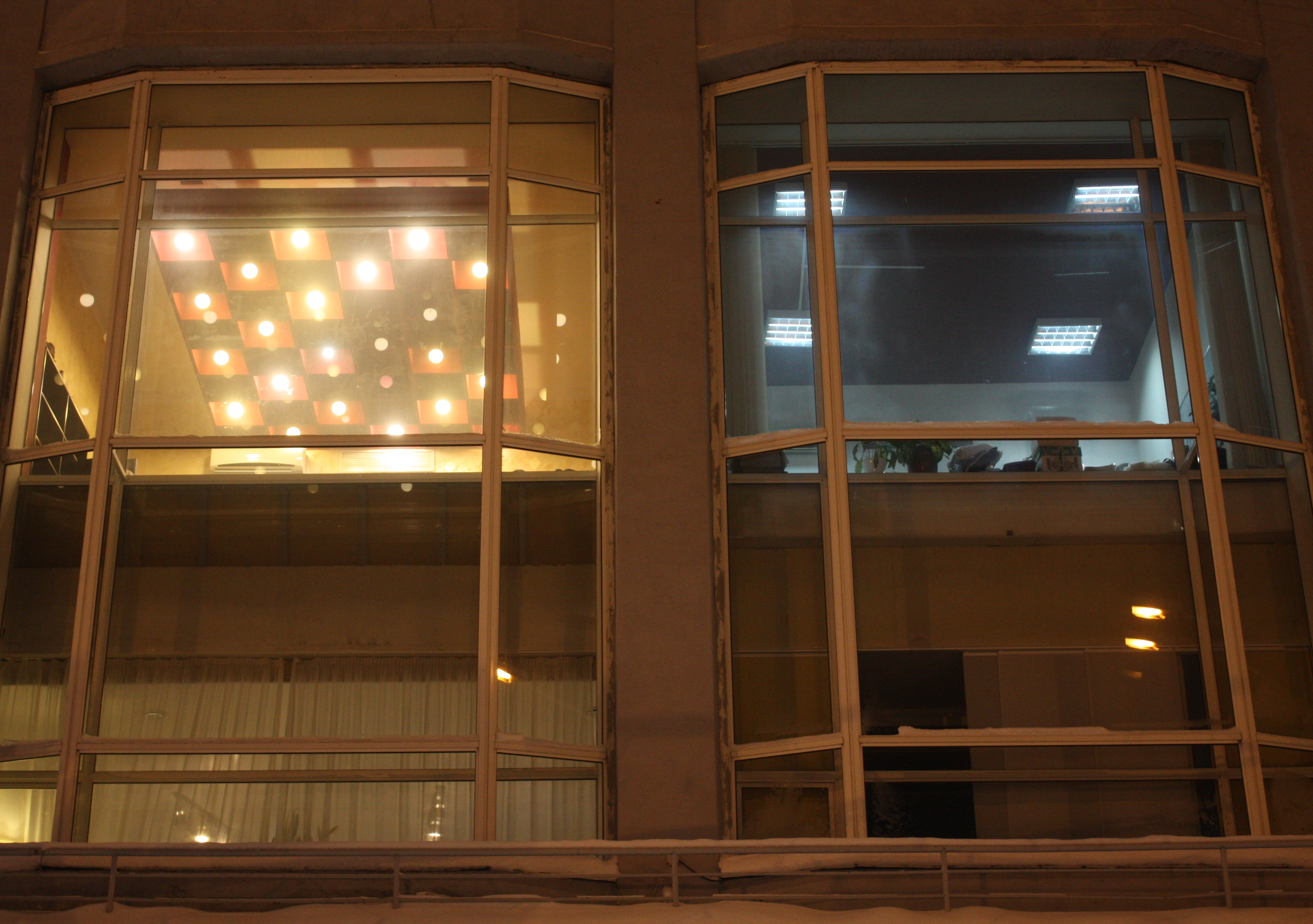

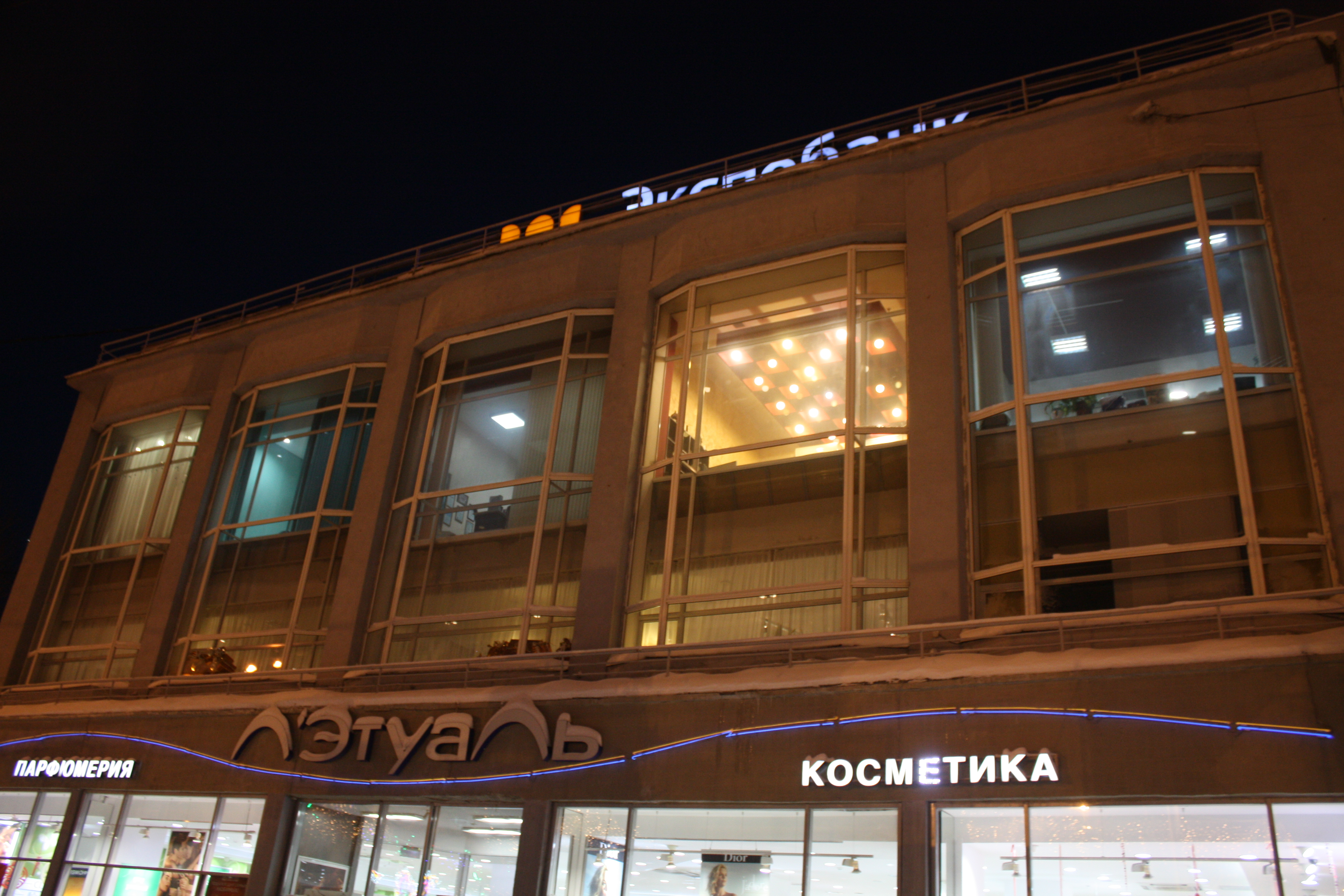

== See also ==
- Gosbank Building
- House of Lenin
- Novosibirsk Opera and Ballet Theatre
- Oblpotrebsoyuz Building
