= Gosbank Building, Novosibirsk =

Building in Novosibirsk, Novosibirsk Oblast, Russia

Gosbank Building
- Здание Госбанка
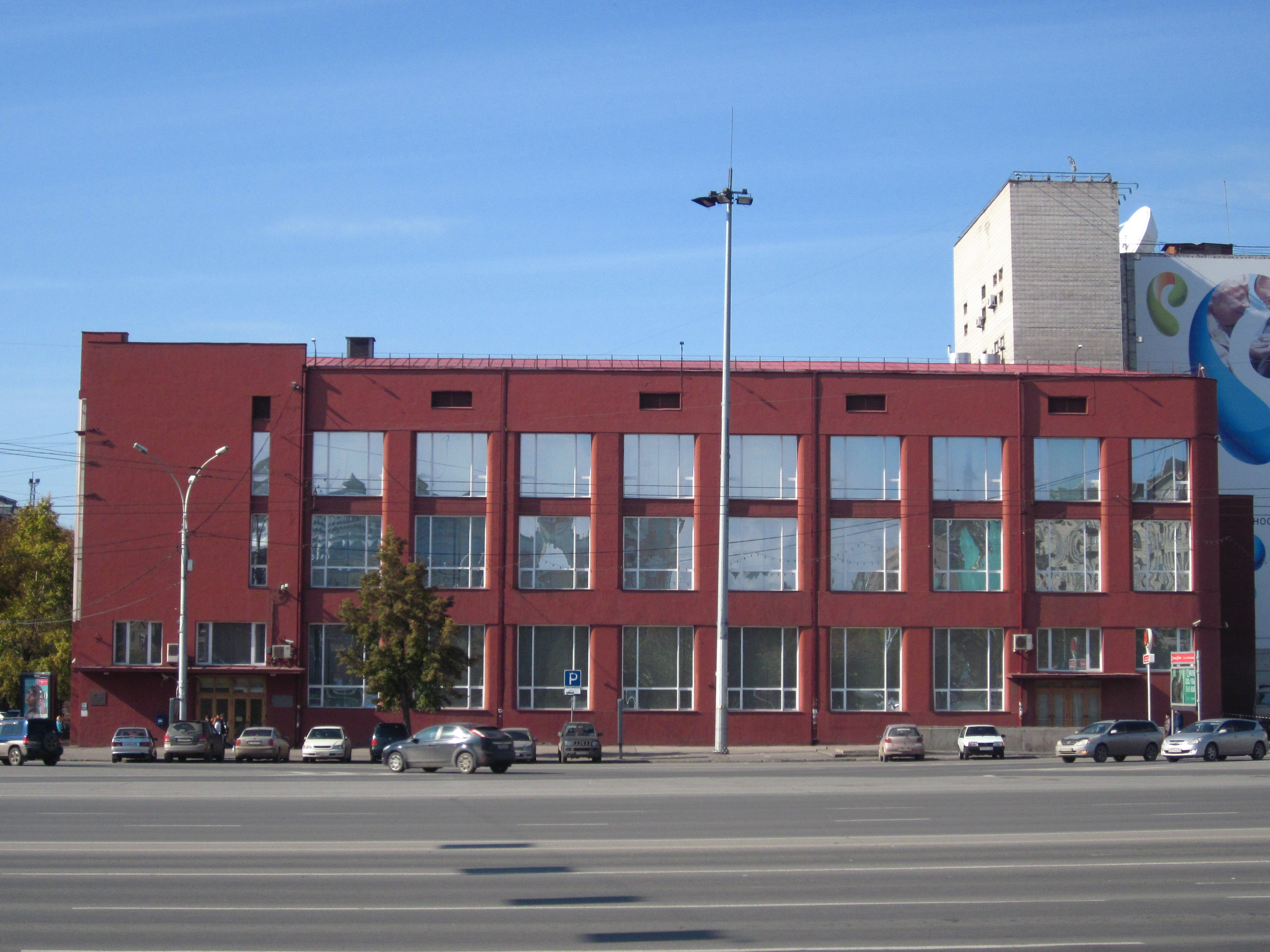
- Interactive map of the Gosbank Building area

General information
- Architectural style: constructivism
- Location: Novosibirsk, Russia
- Coordinates: 55.0304°N 82.9188°E
- Completed: 1930

Design and construction
- Architect: Andrey Kryachkov

The Gosbank Building (Russian: Здание Госбанка) is a constructivist building designed by Andrey Kryachkov. It is located on Krasny Avenue in Novosibirsk, Russia. The building is a part of the architectural ensemble of Lenin Square.

== History ==
The Construction of the building began in 1929 and was completed in 1930.

== Gallery ==
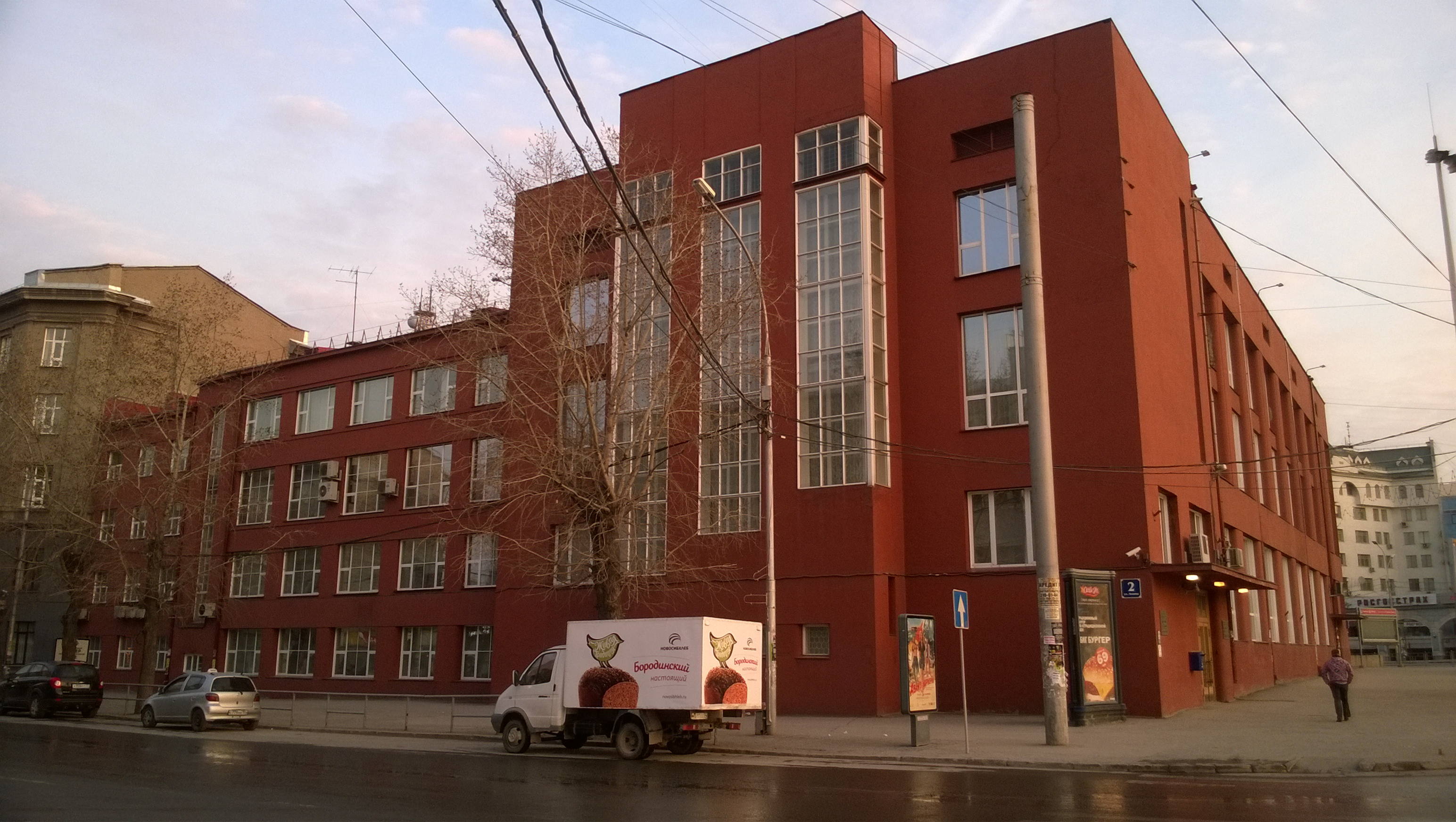

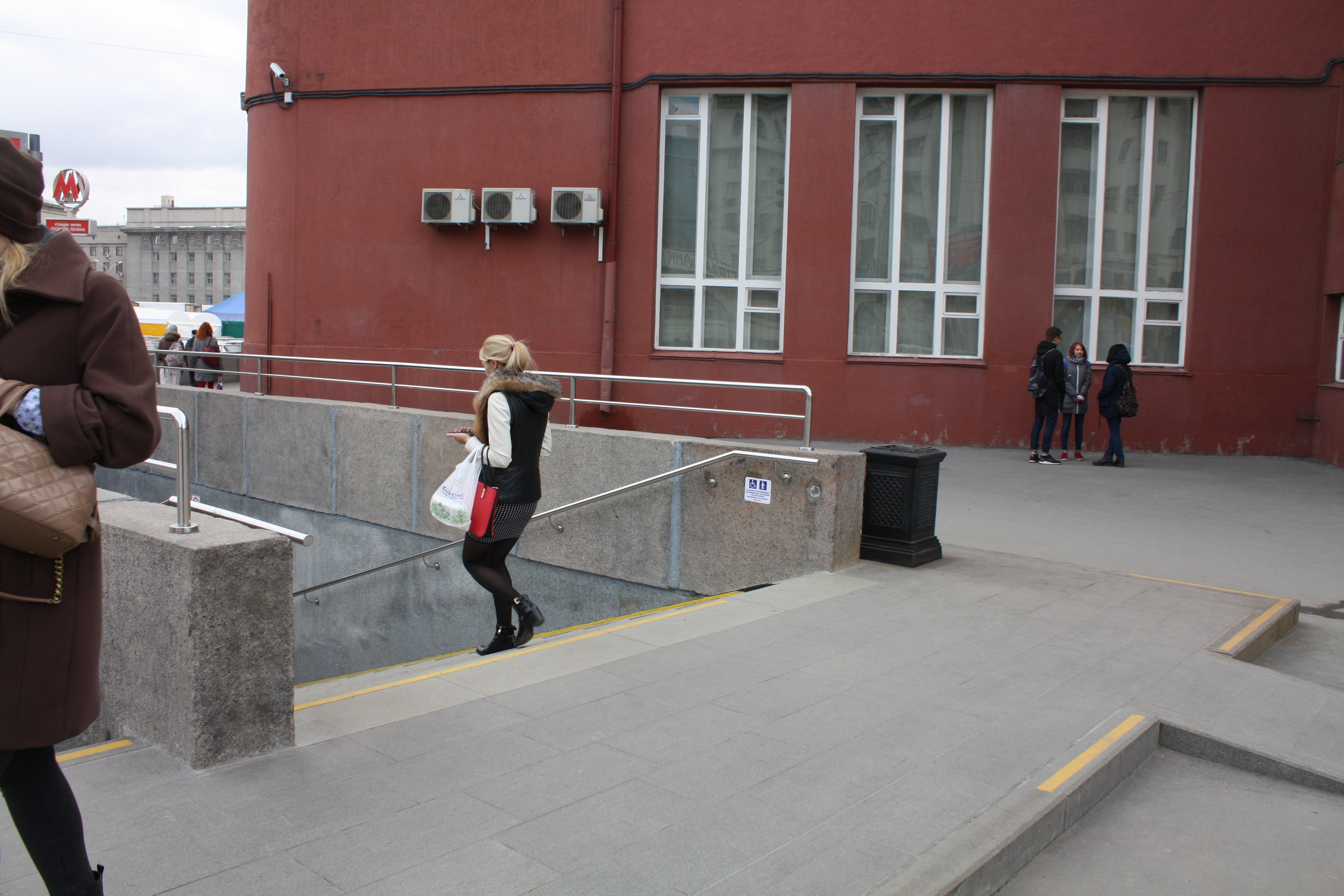

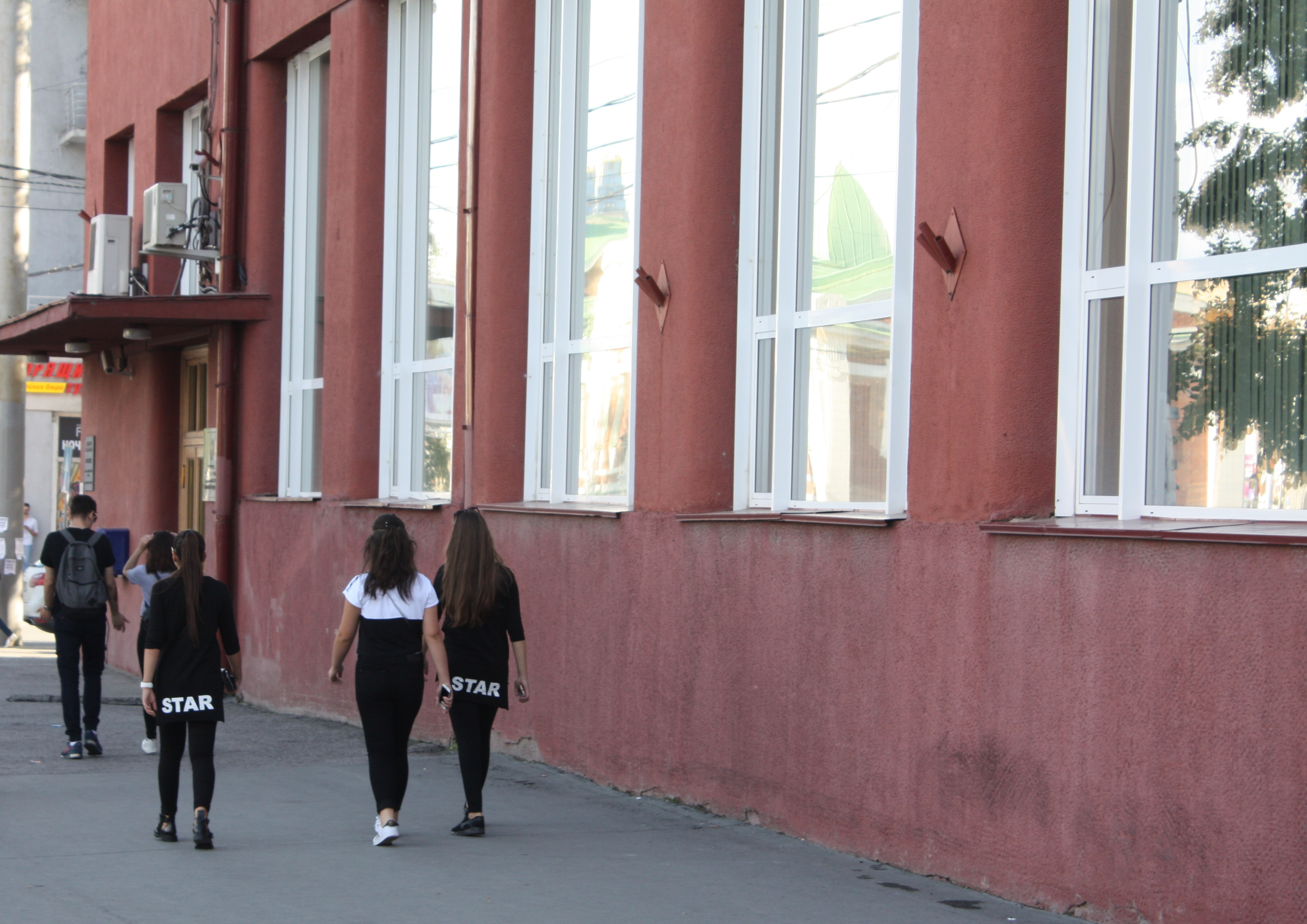

== See also ==
- Oblpotrebsoyuz Building
- Polyclinic No. 1

== Bibliography ==
- Ламин В. А. (2003). Энциклопедия. Новосибирск. Новосибирск: Новосибирское книжное издательство. p. 343. ISBN 5-7620-0968-8.
