= October Revolution House of Culture =

- Дом культуры имени Октябрьской революции
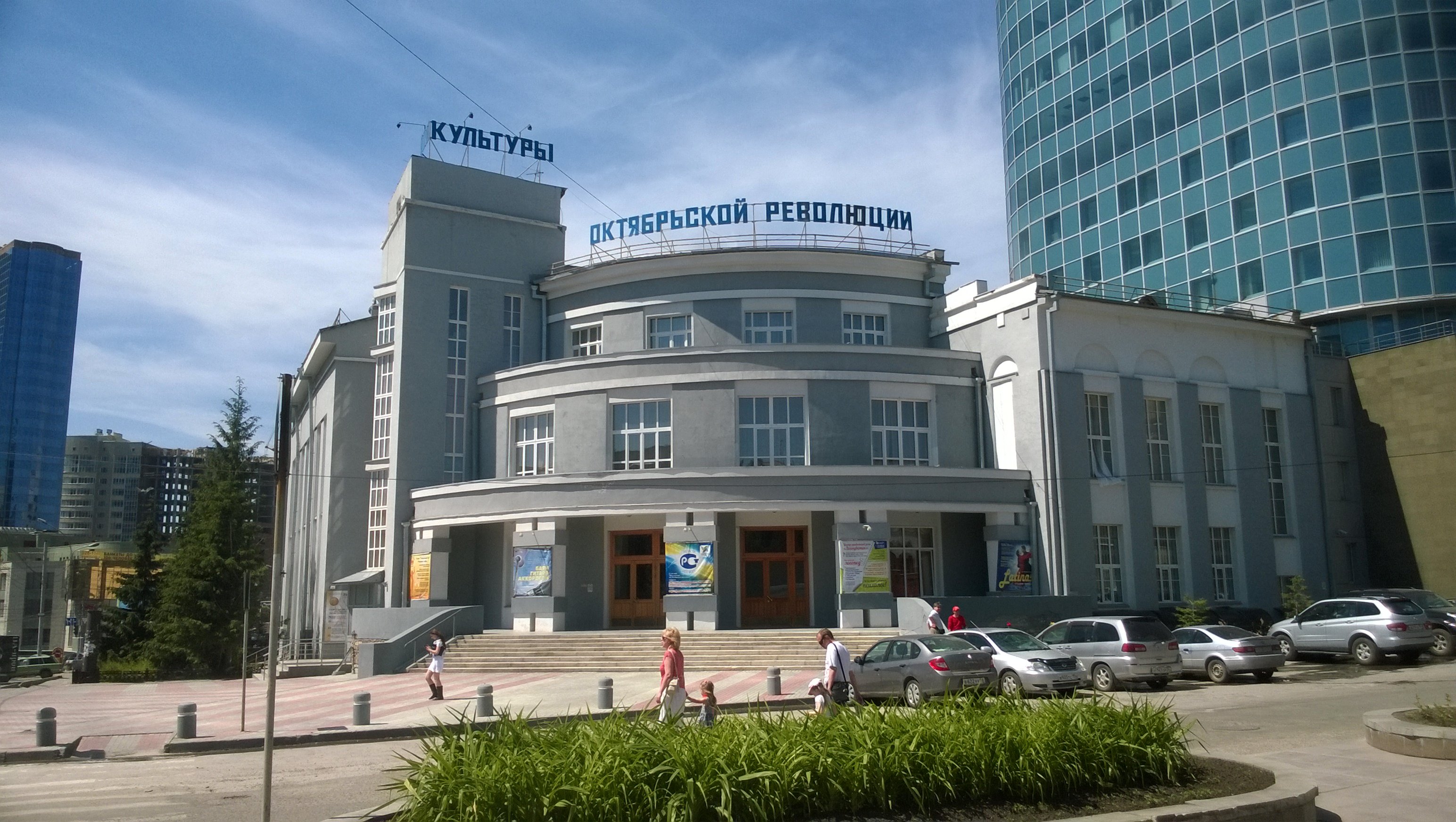
- Interactive map of the October Revolution House of Culture area

General information
- Location: Lenin Street 24, Novosibirsk, Russia
- Completed: 1927

Design and construction
- Architect: I. A. Burlakov

October Revolution House of Culture (Russian: Дом культуры имени Октябрьской революции) is a constructivist building in Zheleznodorozhny City District of Novosibirsk, Russia. It was built in 1927. The building is located on the corner of Lenin and Revolution streets. Architect: I. A. Burlakov.

== History ==
The house was built in 1927 by the architect I. A. Burlakov.

From 1941 to 1944 the building was occupied by Leningrad Philharmonic Orchestra.

== See also ==
- Gosbank Building
- Prombank Dormitory
- Polyclinic No. 1
