= Pobeda Cinema, Novosibirsk =

Cinema in Novosibirsk, Russia

Pobeda
- Победа
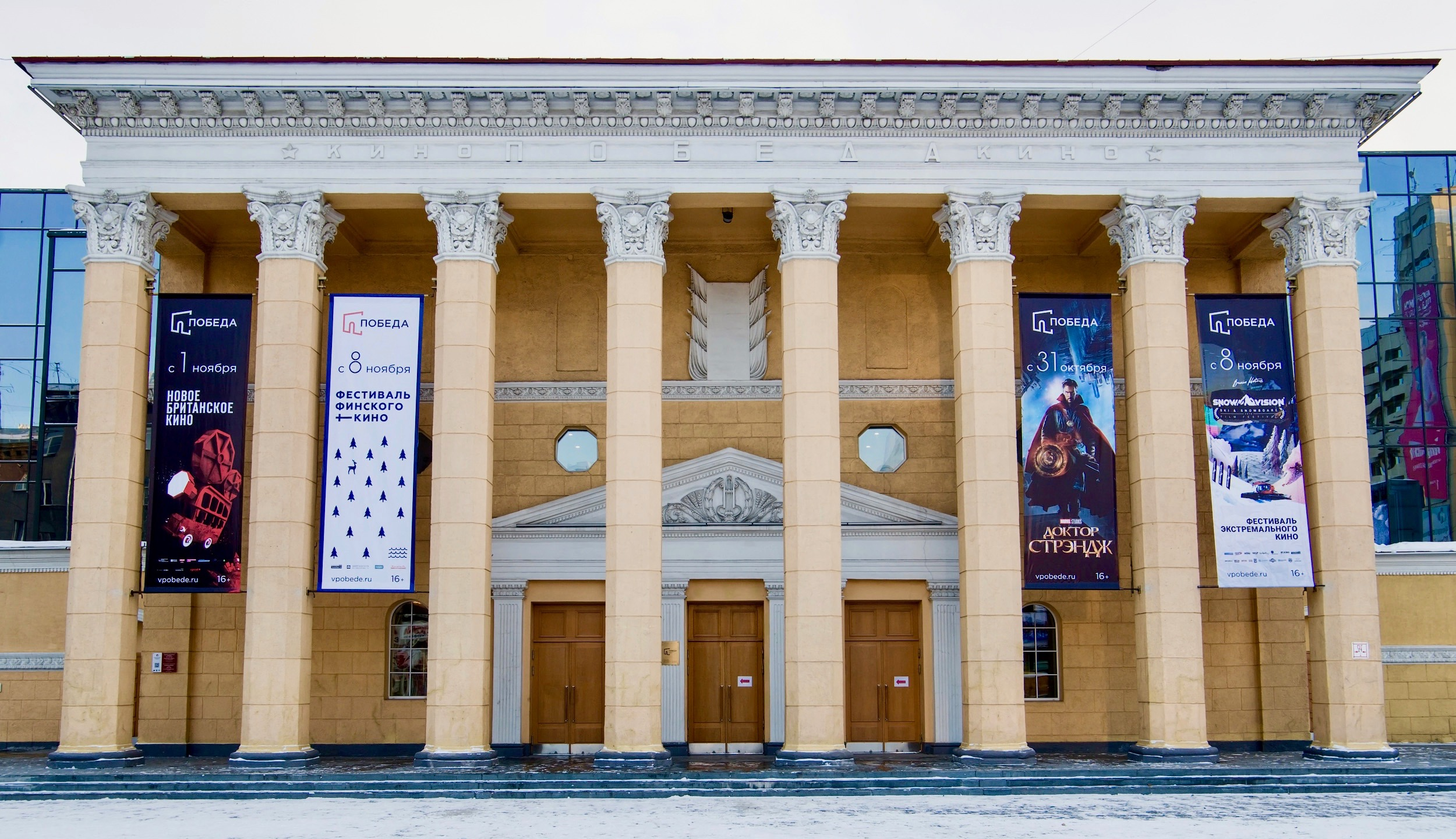
- Interactive map of the Pobeda area

General information
- Location: Novosibirsk, Russia
- Coordinates: 55.02916°N 82.91480°E
- Completed: 1925

Pobeda Cinema (Russian: Кинотеатр «Победа») is a cinema in Zheleznodorozhny District, Novosibirsk Russia. It is located at Lenin Street. The cinema was built in 1925.

== History ==
The cinema was constructed in 1925.

In 1936, the building of the cinema was reconstructed by architect V. S. Maslennikov.

The cinema was also reconstructed in 1951 (architects: G. F. Kravtsov, B. A. Bitkin, A. P. Mordvov), 1958–1959 (architects: G. F. Kravtsov, G. P. Zilberman), 1967 and 2006.

== Gallery ==
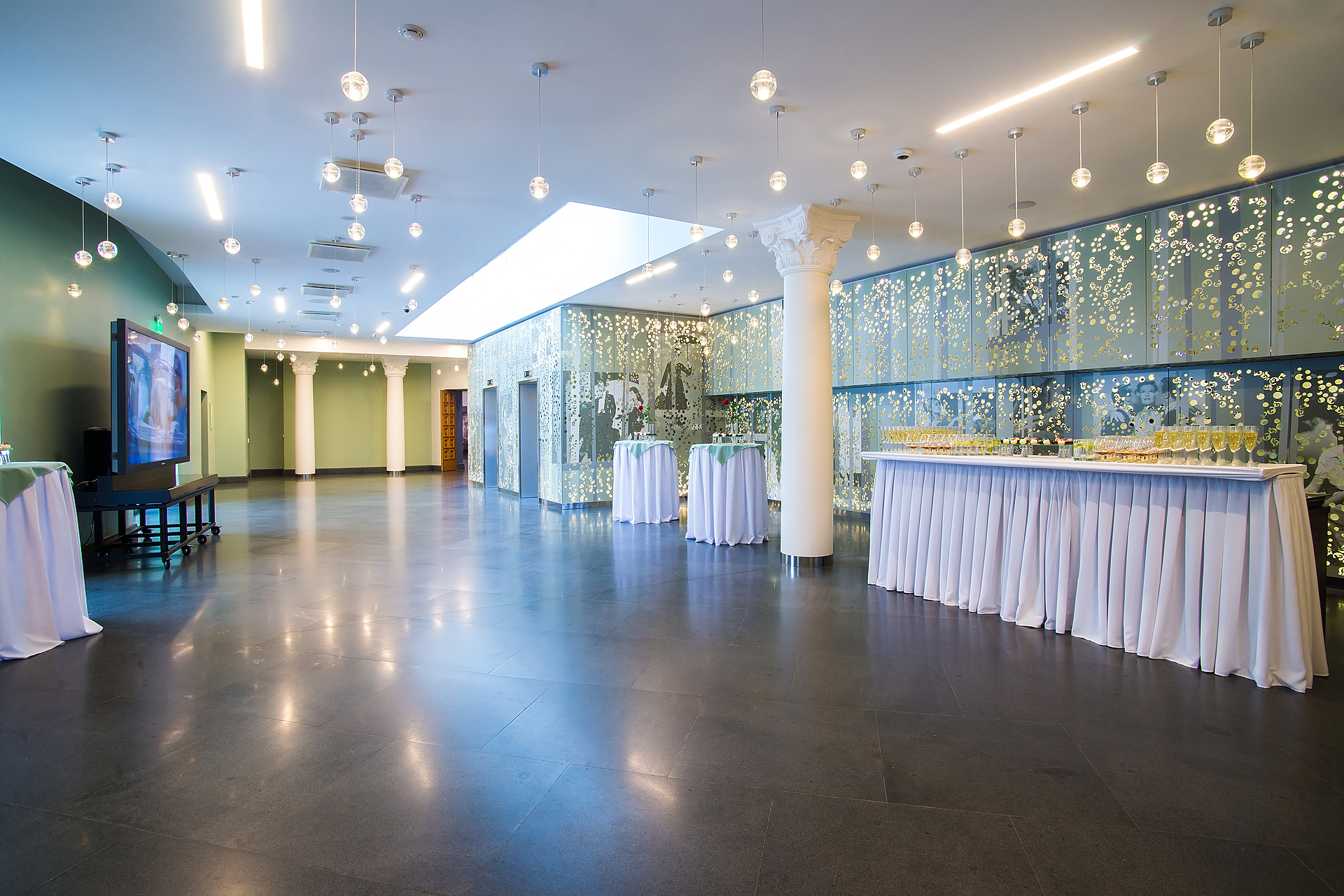

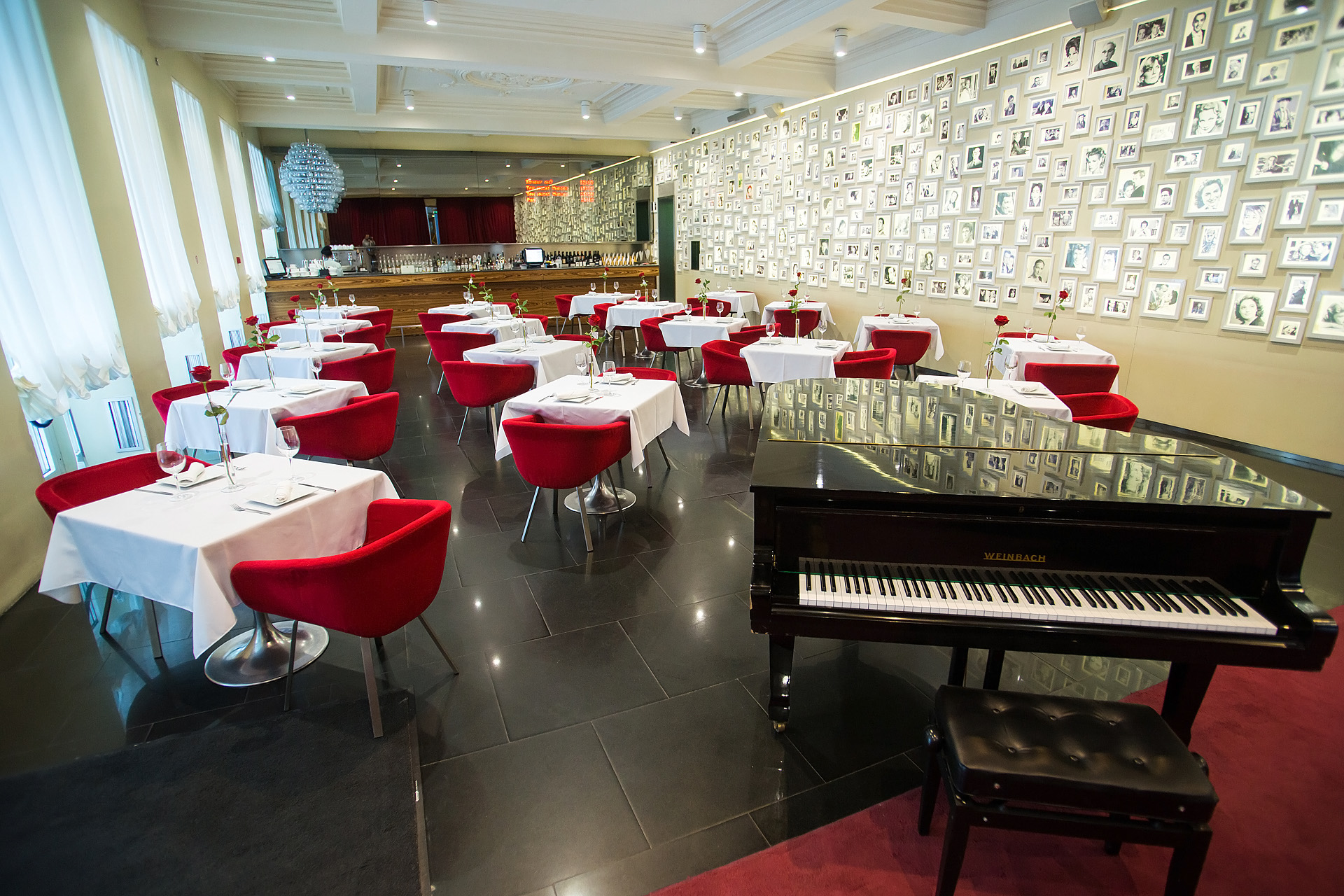

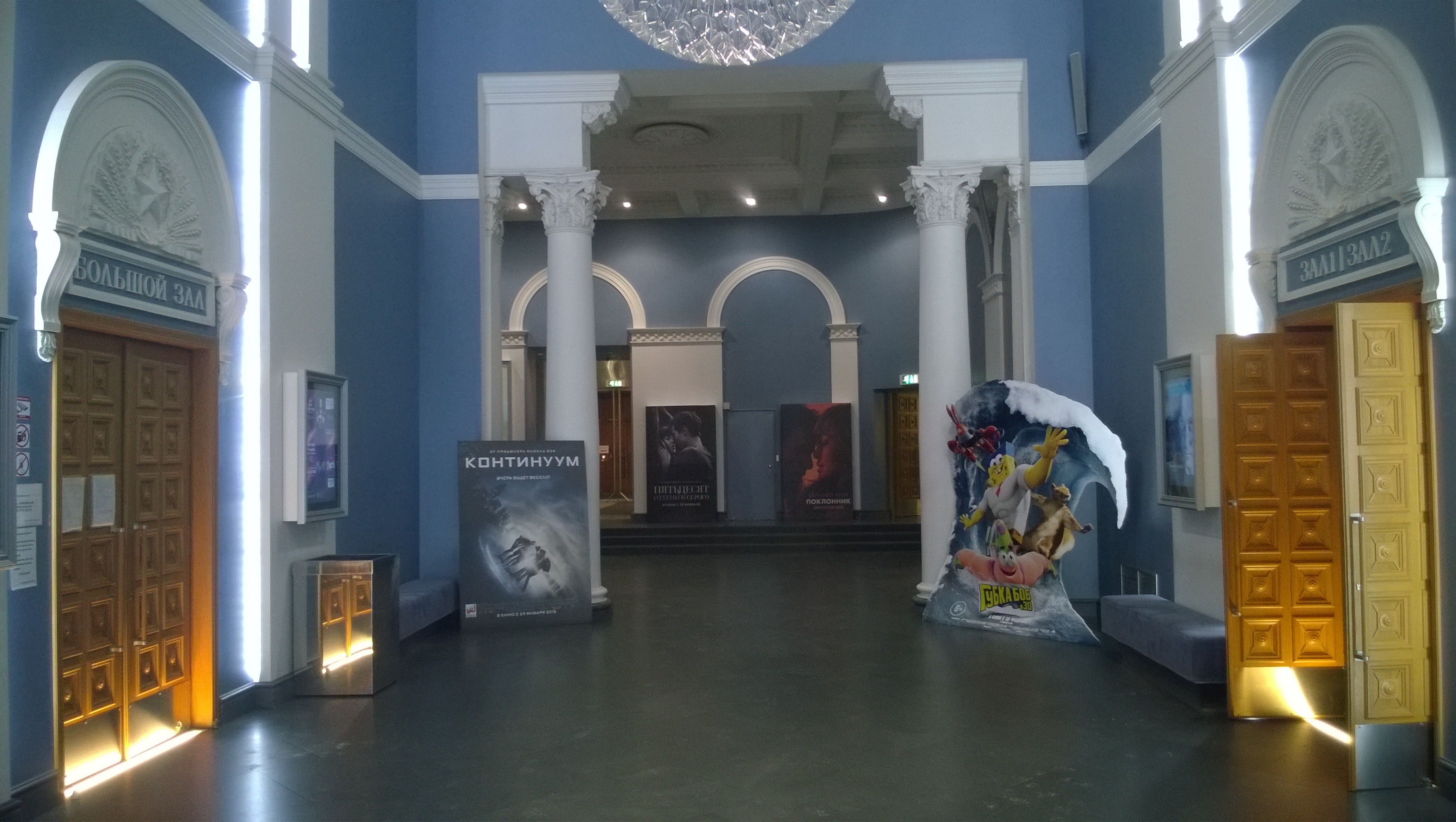

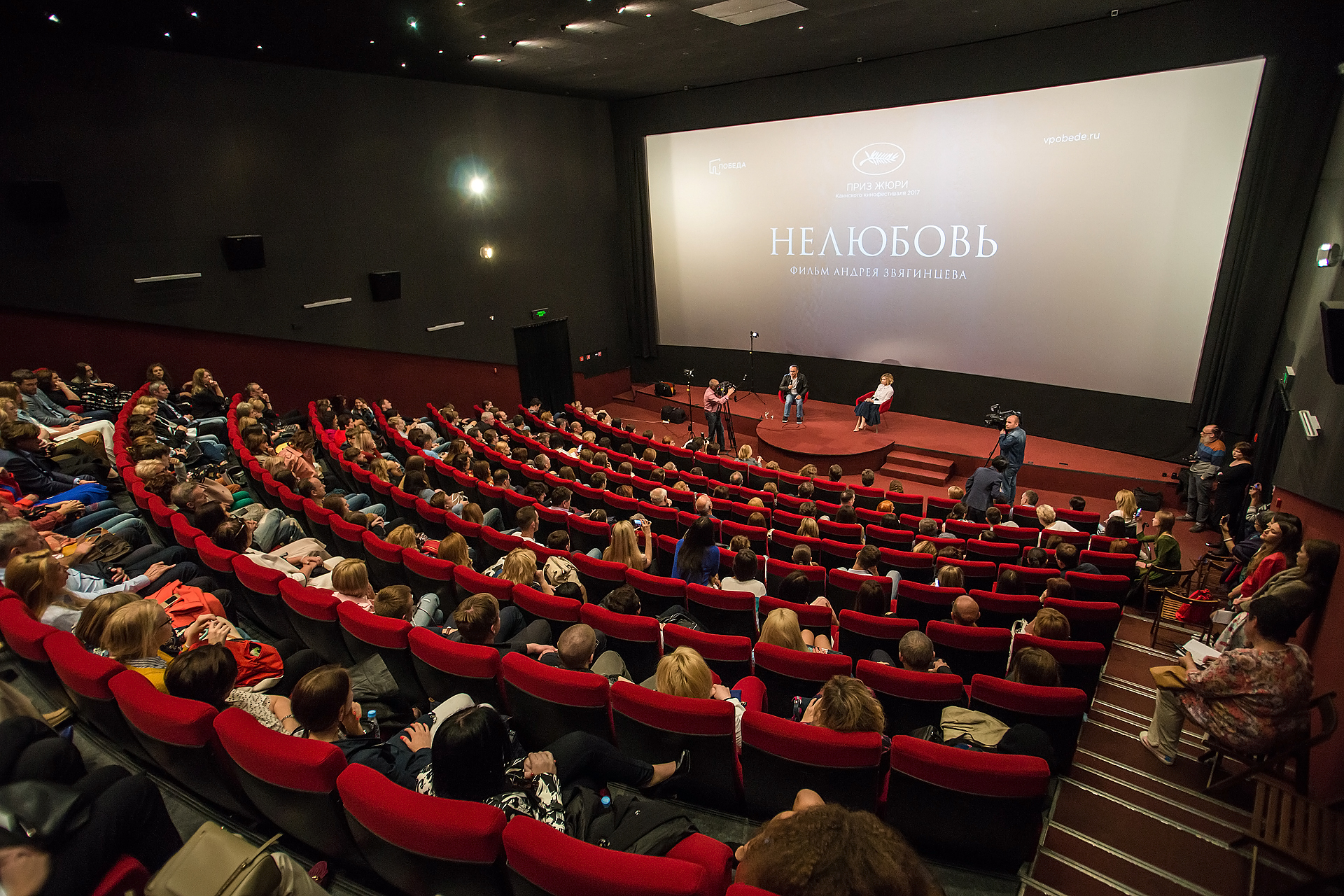

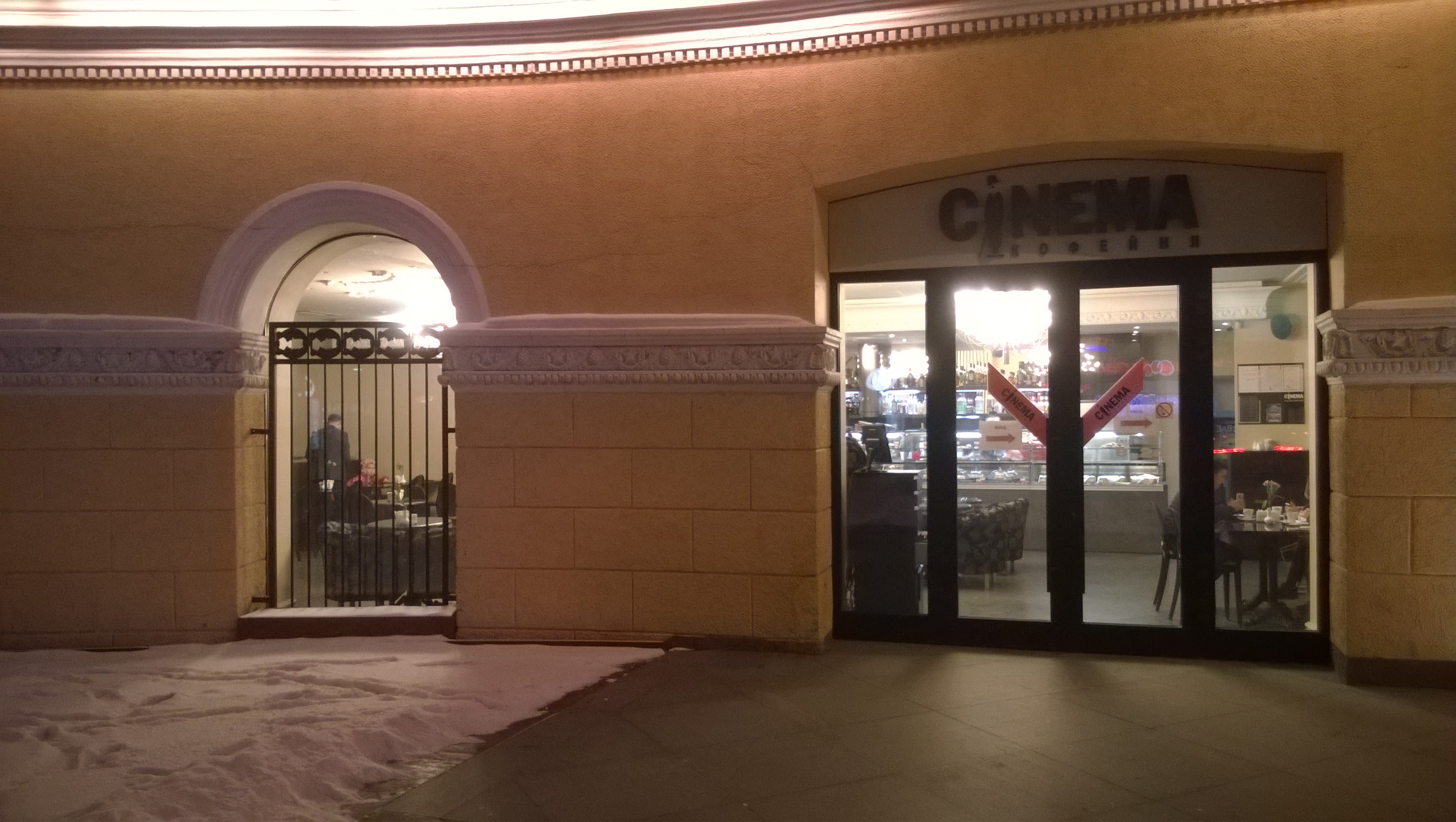

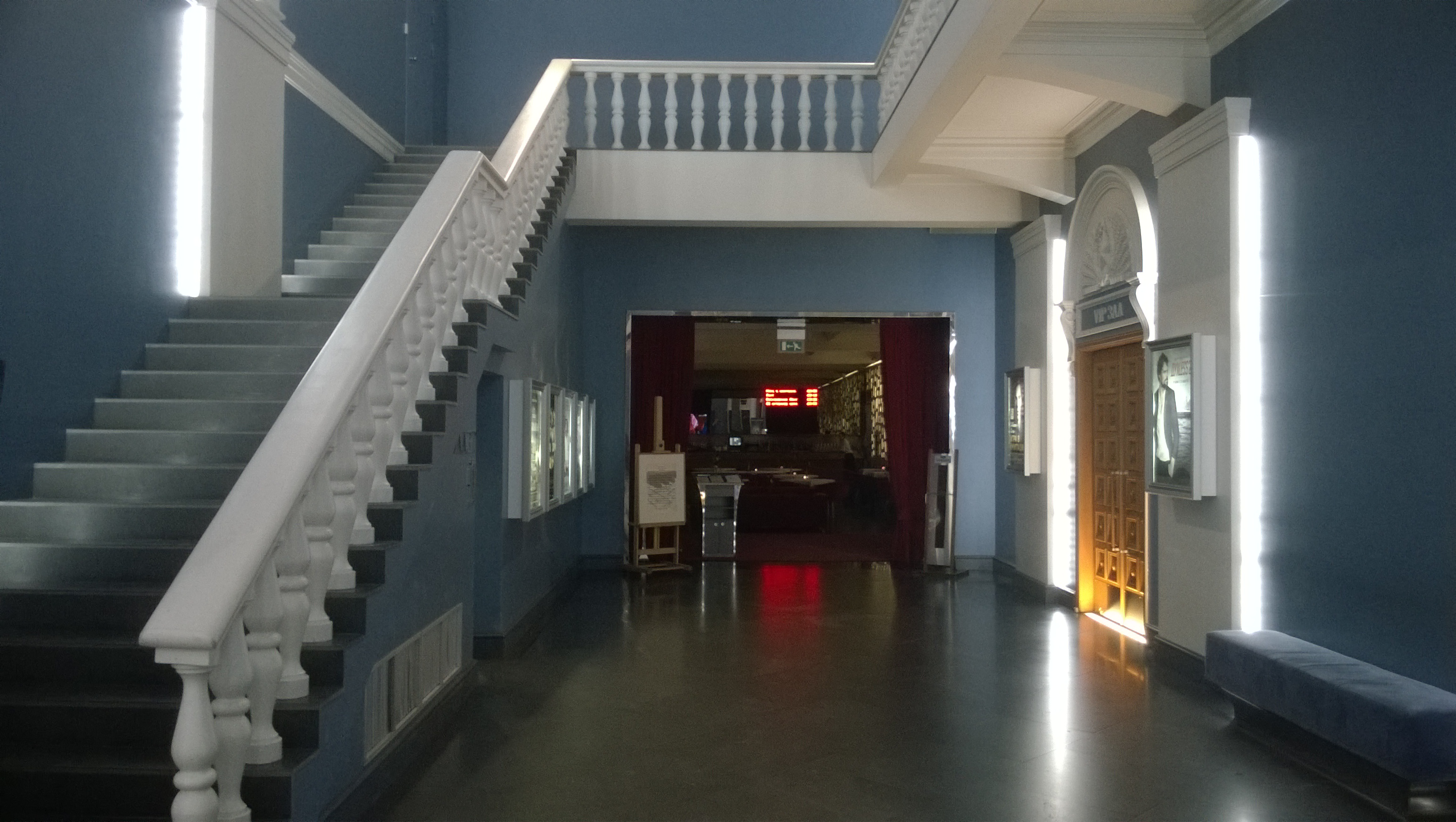
