= Polyclinic No. 1 (Novosibirsk) =

The Polyclinic No. 1
- Поликлиника № 1
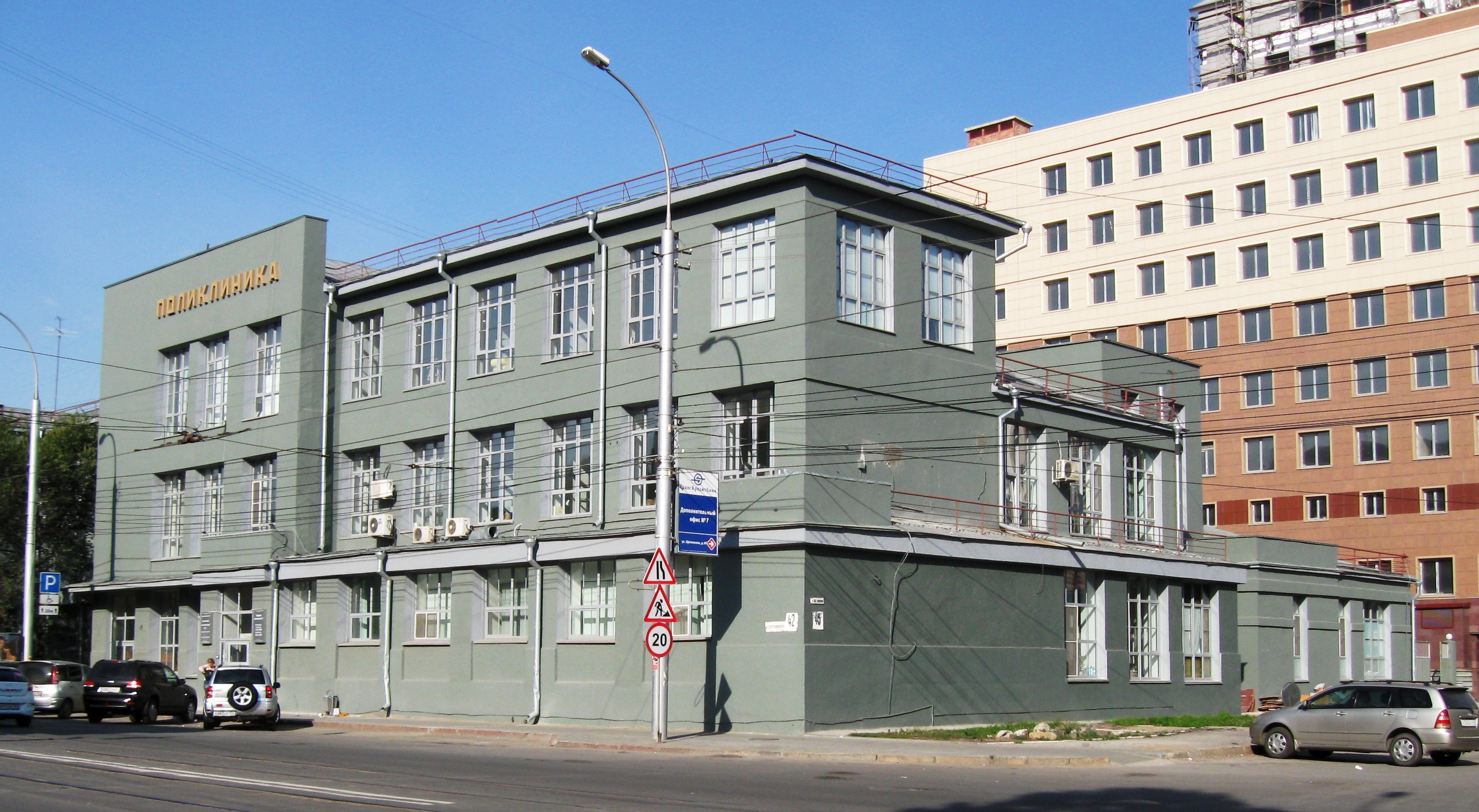
- Interactive map of the The Polyclinic No. 1 area

General information
- Architectural style: constructivism
- Location: Novosibirsk, Russia
- Completed: 1928

Design and construction
- Architect: P. Shchyokin

Website
- gp1.mednsk.ru

The Polyclinic No. 1 (Russian: Поликлиника № 1) is a constructivist building designed by P. Shchyokin. It is located on Serebrennikovskaya Street in the Tsentralny City District of Novosibirsk, Russia.

== History ==
The Polyclinic was built in 1928. The cost of construction amounted to 600,000 rubles.

At first the medical staff consisted of 132 medical workers (34 doctors).

In 2002, the polyclinic employed 346 medical workers (112 doctors).

== See also ==
- Gosbank Building
- October Revolution House of Culture
- House of Artists

== Bibliography ==
- Ламин В. А. (2003). Энциклопедия. Новосибирск. Новосибирск: Новосибирское книжное издательство. p. 138. ISBN 5-7620-0968-8.
