= Lenin Street, Novosibirsk =

Street in Novosibirsk, Russia

Lenin Street
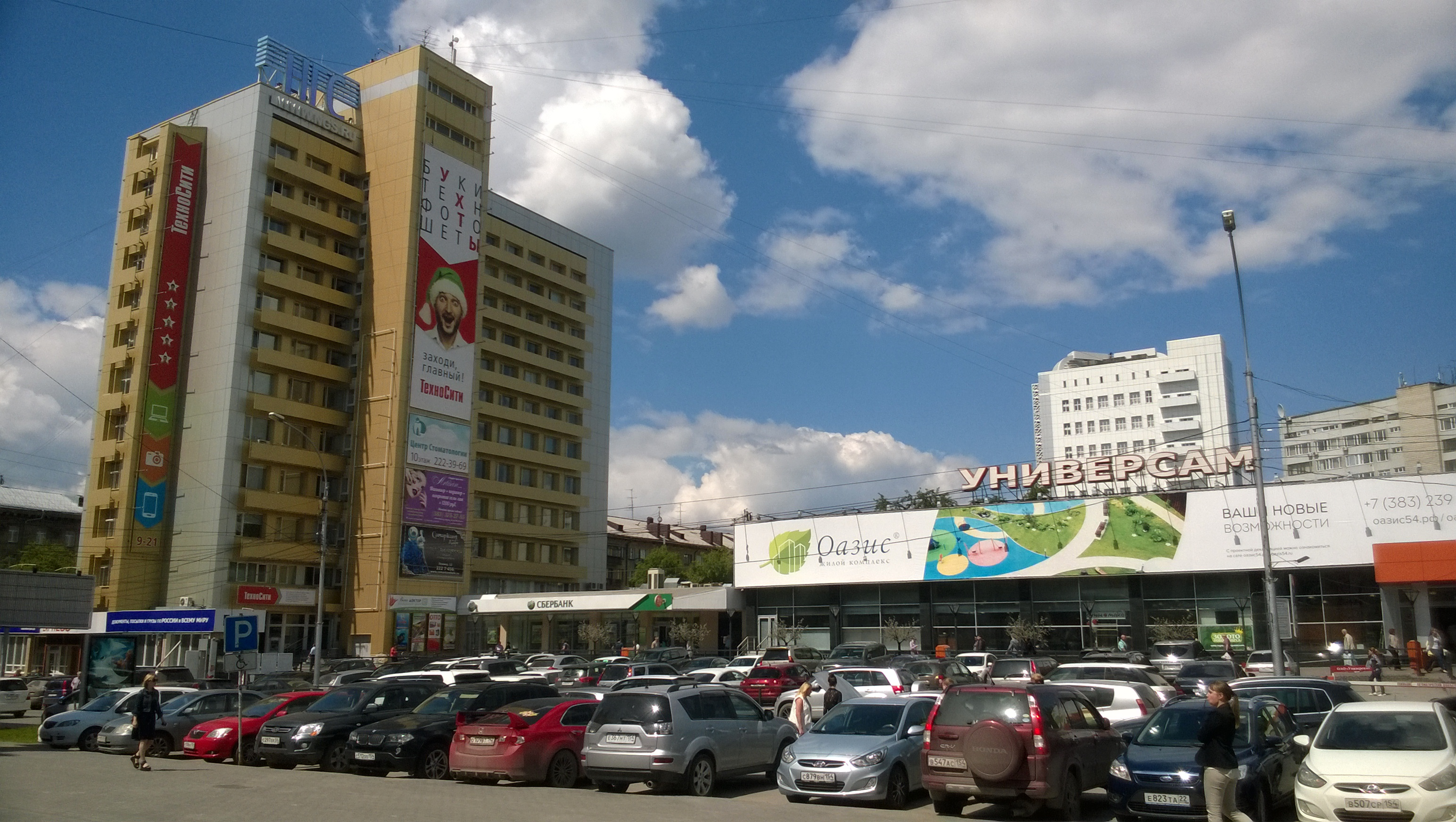
- Native name: Улица Ленина (Russian)
- Location: Novosibirsk; Russia
- Nearest metro station: Ploshchad Lenina; Ploshchad Garina-Mikhaylovskogo

Lenin Street (Russian: Улица Ленина) is a street in Tsentralny and Zheleznodorozhny districts of Novosibirsk, Russia. It starts from Krasny Avenue, runs west, crosses Sovetskaya and Uritsky streets, Street of Revolution, forms a crossroad with Dimitrov Avenue, then turns north-west, crosses Komsomolsky Avenue, 1905 Year Street and forms a crossroads with Dmitry Shamshurin and Zheleznodorozhny streets.

== Gallery ==
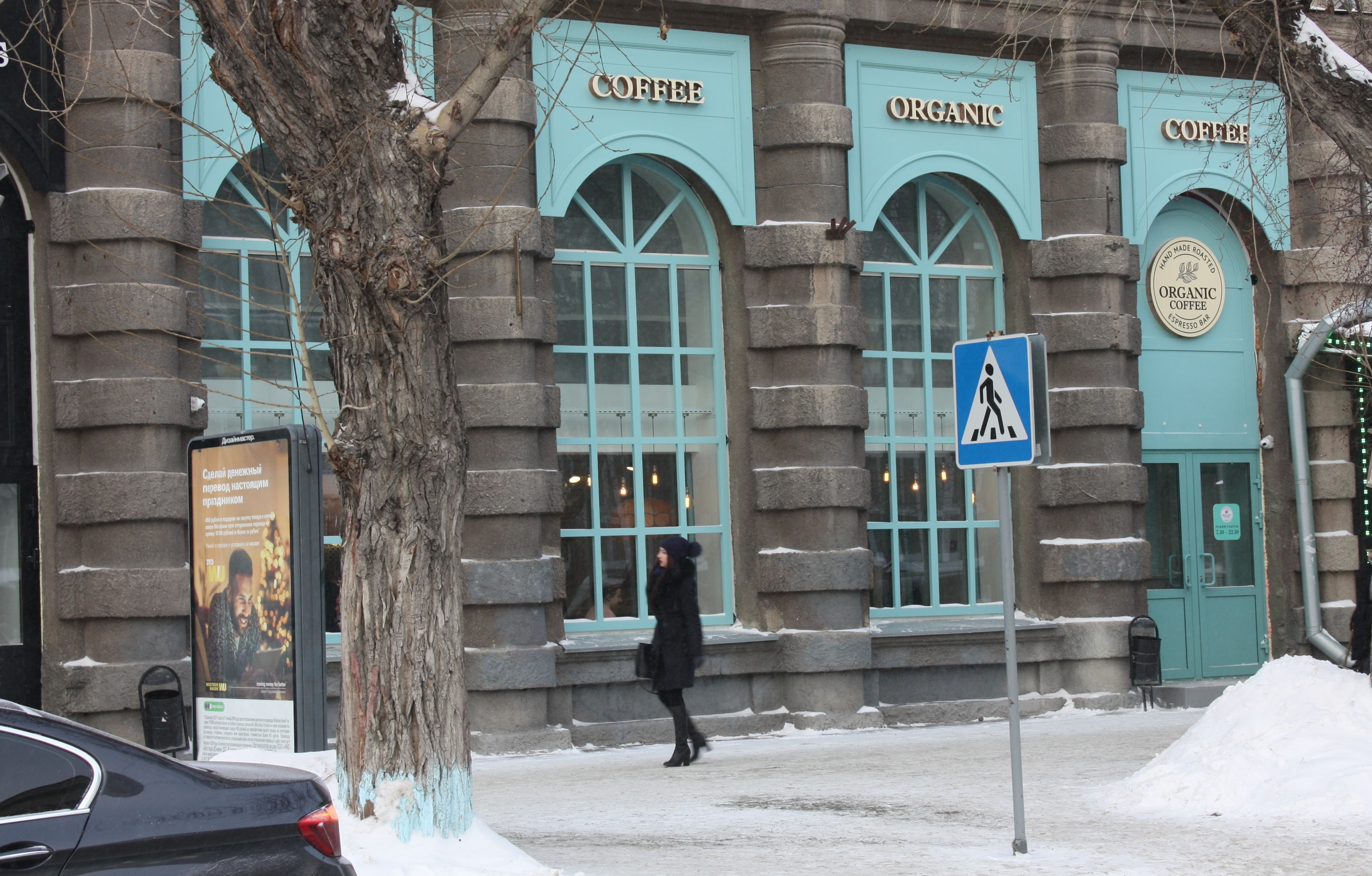

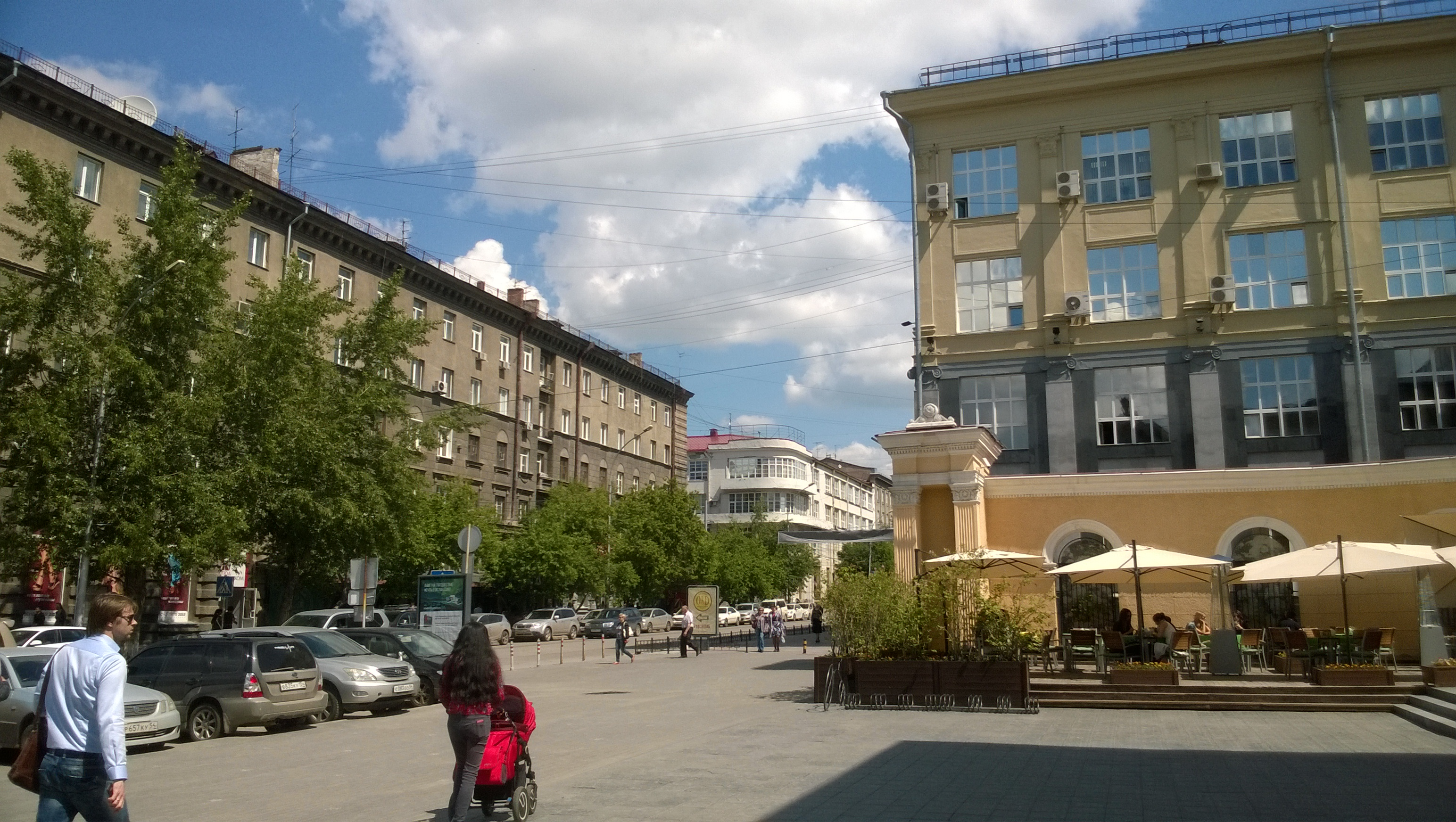

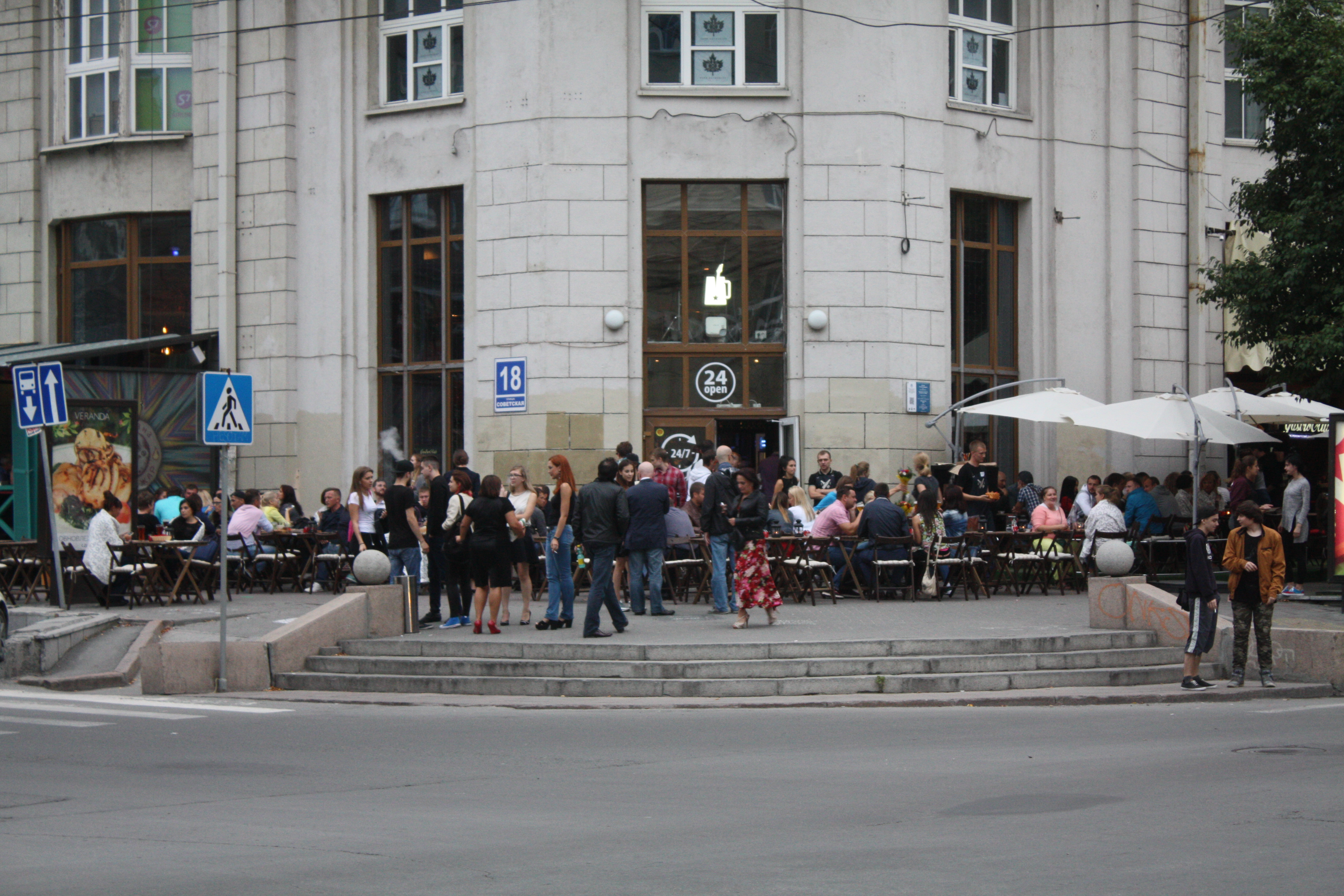

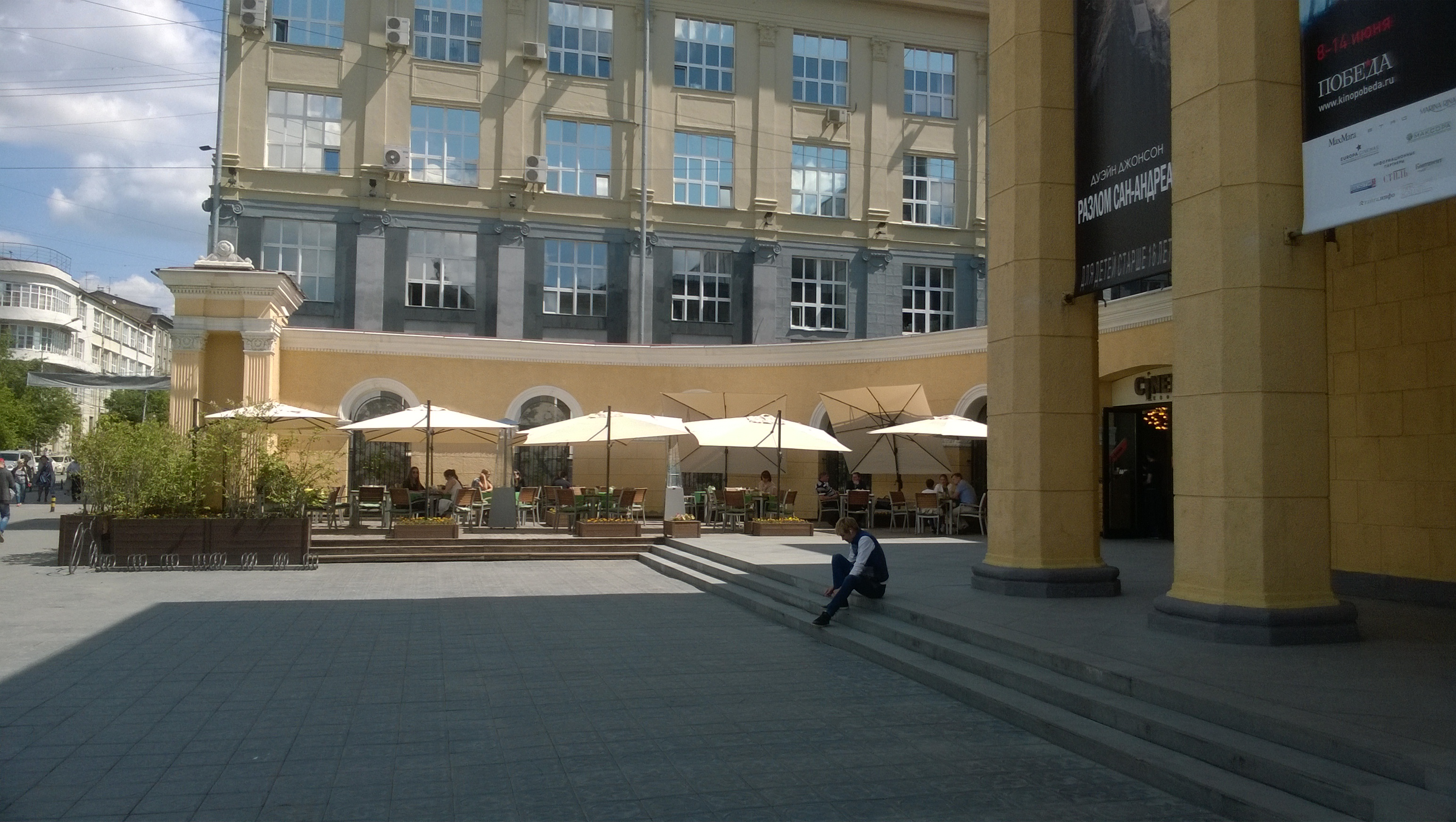

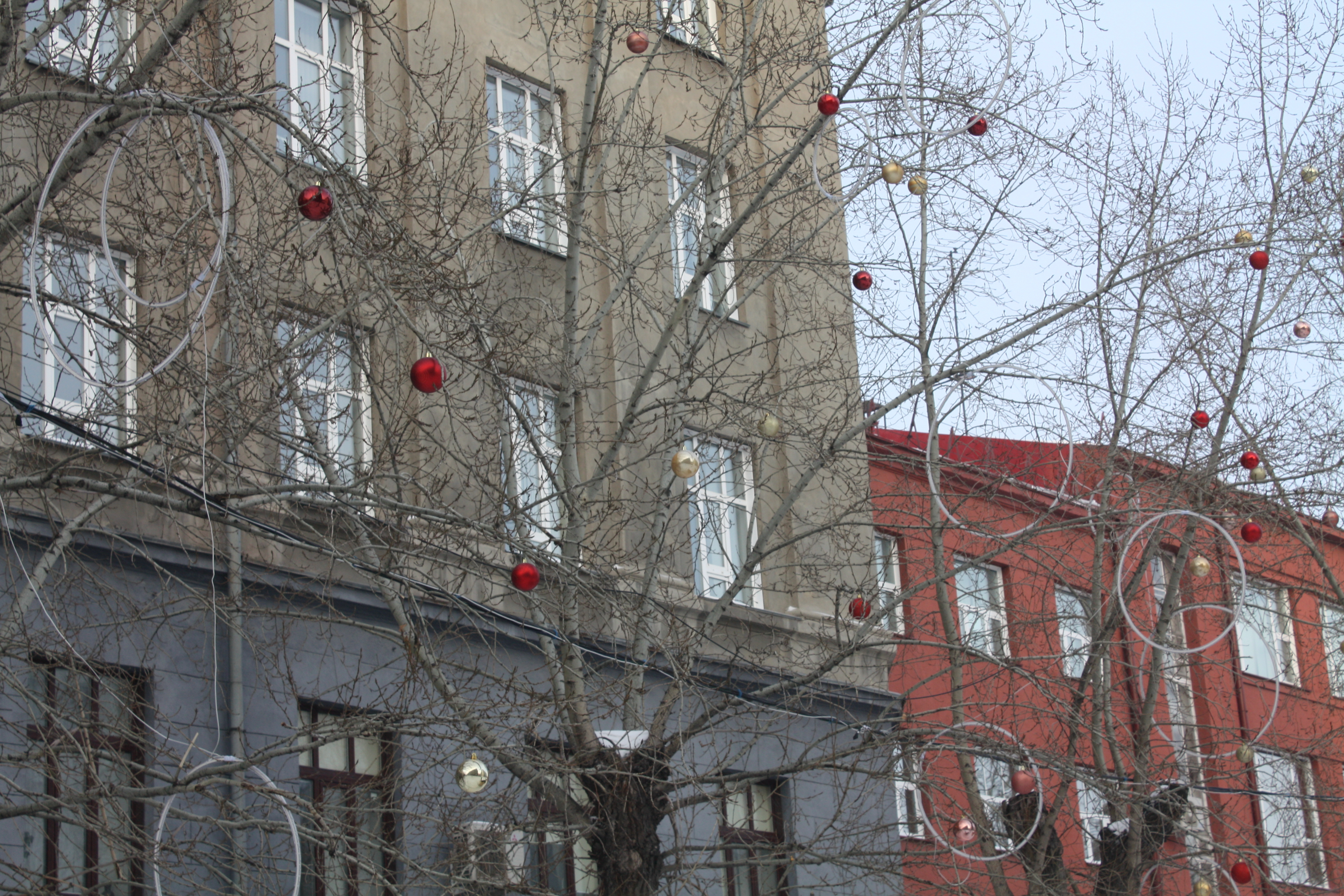

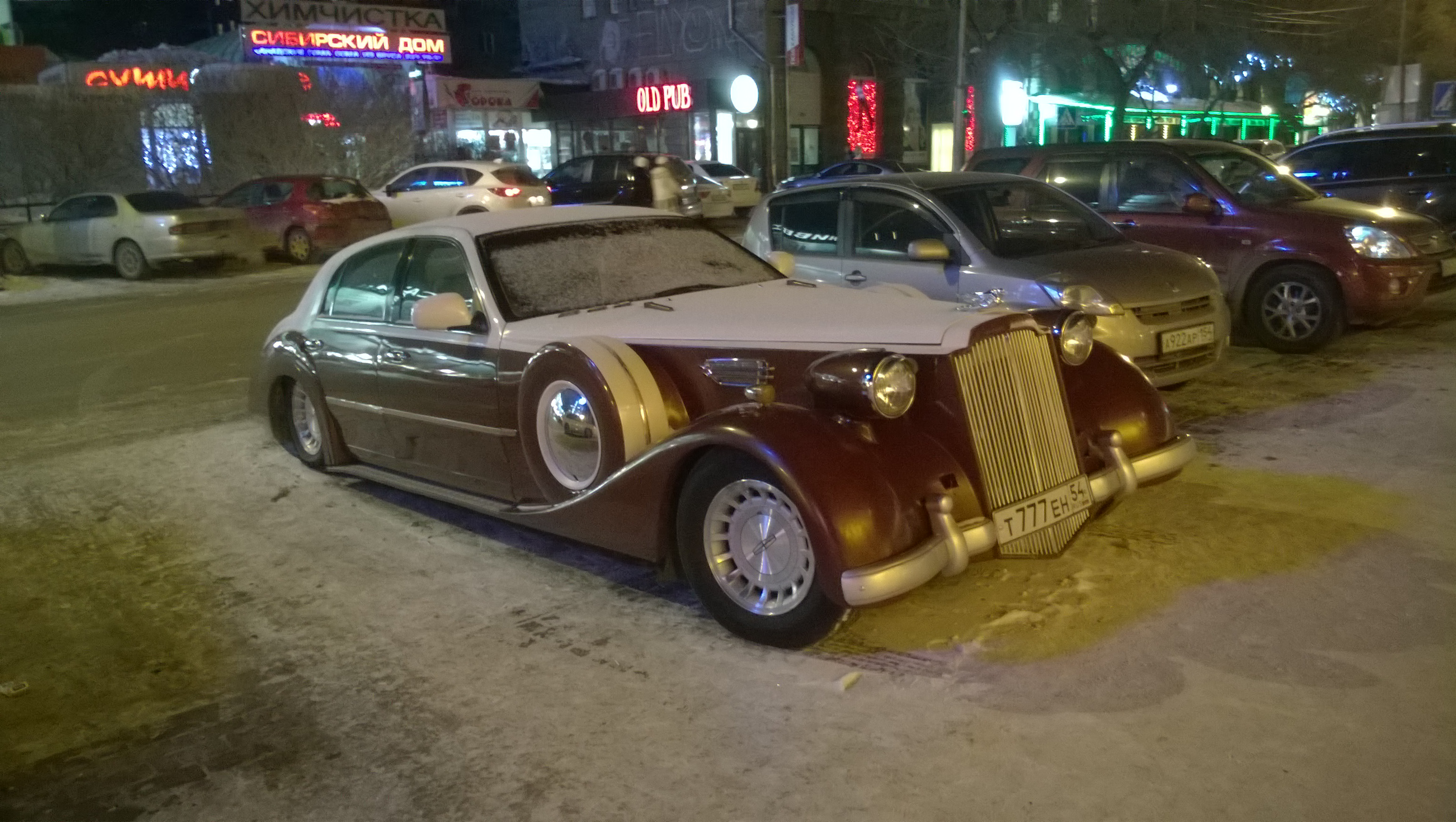

== Architecture ==
- Women's Gimnasium of P. A. Smirnova is a building on the corner of Uritsky and Sovetskaya streets. It was built in 1905.
- Main Post Office is a building on the corner of Sovetskaya and Lenin streets. It was built in 1916.
- Pobeda Cinema is a cinema built in 1925.
- House of Textiles is a building on the corner of Sovetskaya and Lenin street. It was built in 1926.
- Univermag is a modernist building on the corner of Chelyuskintsev and Lenin streets. It was built in 1927.
- October Revolution House of Culture is a constructivist building on the corner of Street of Revolution and Lenin Street. It was built in 1928.
- Business House is a constructivist building on the corner of Krasny Avenue and Lenin Street. It was built in 1928.
- Gosbank Building is a constructivist building on the corner of Krasny Avenue and Lenin Street. It was built in 1930.
- Housing estate near Novosibirsk-Glavny Railway Station is a constructivist building complex built in 1928–1933. It was located between Lenin, Chelyuskintsev and Omskaya streets.
- Lenin Street 8 (Sovetskaya Street 35) is a building on the corner of Sovetskaya and Lenin streets. It was built in 1951.
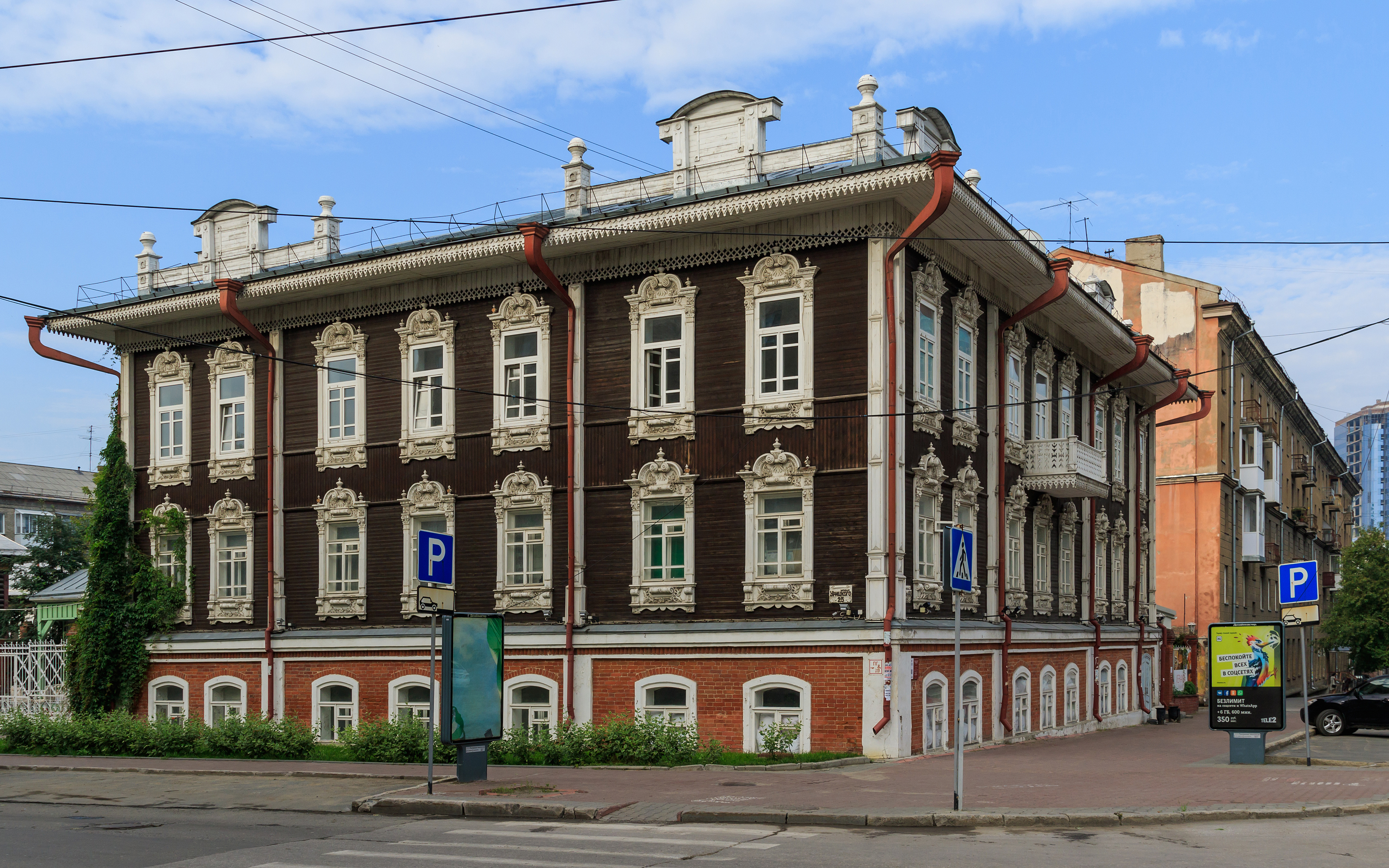
Women's Gimnasium of P. A. Smirnova

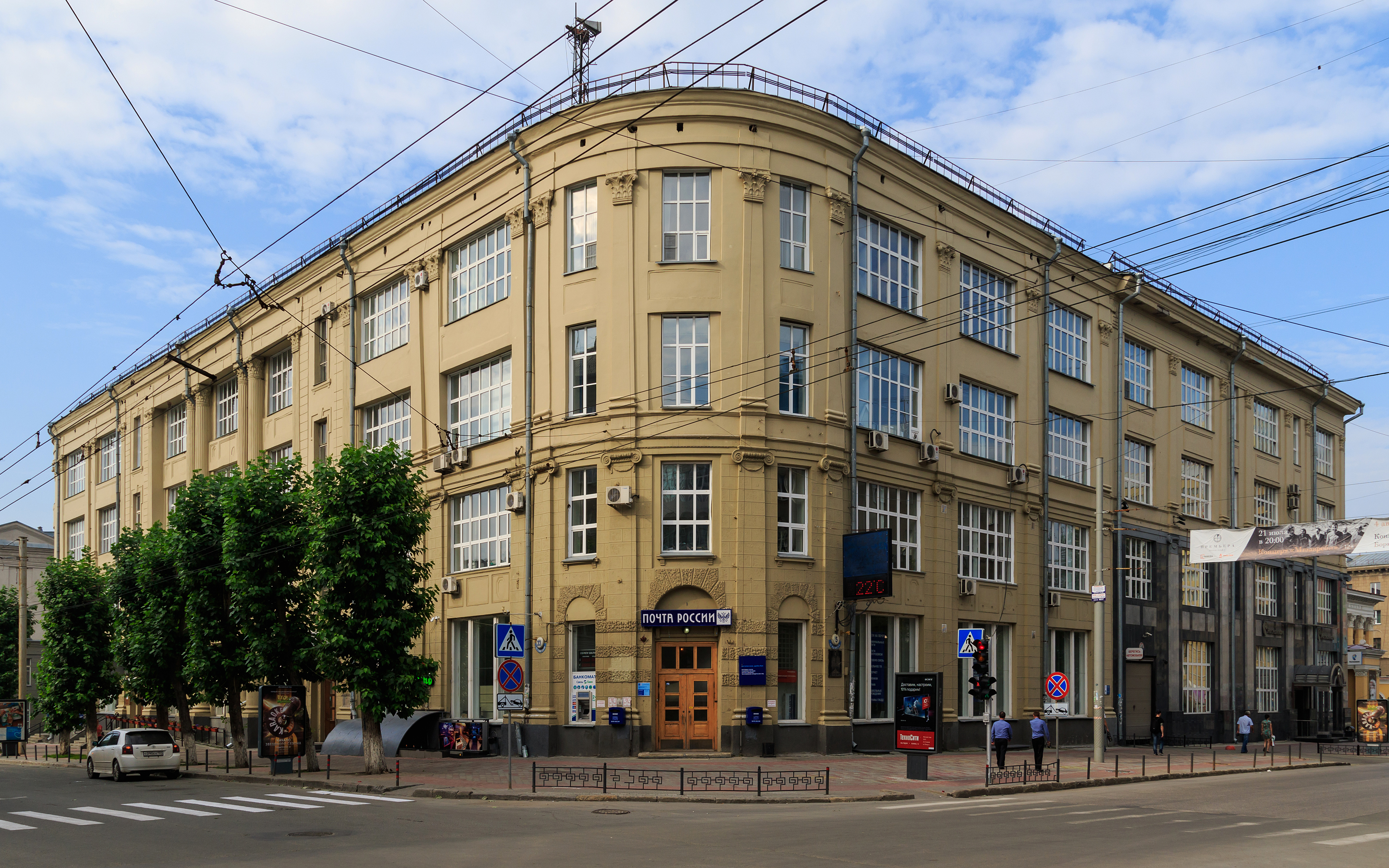
Main Post Office

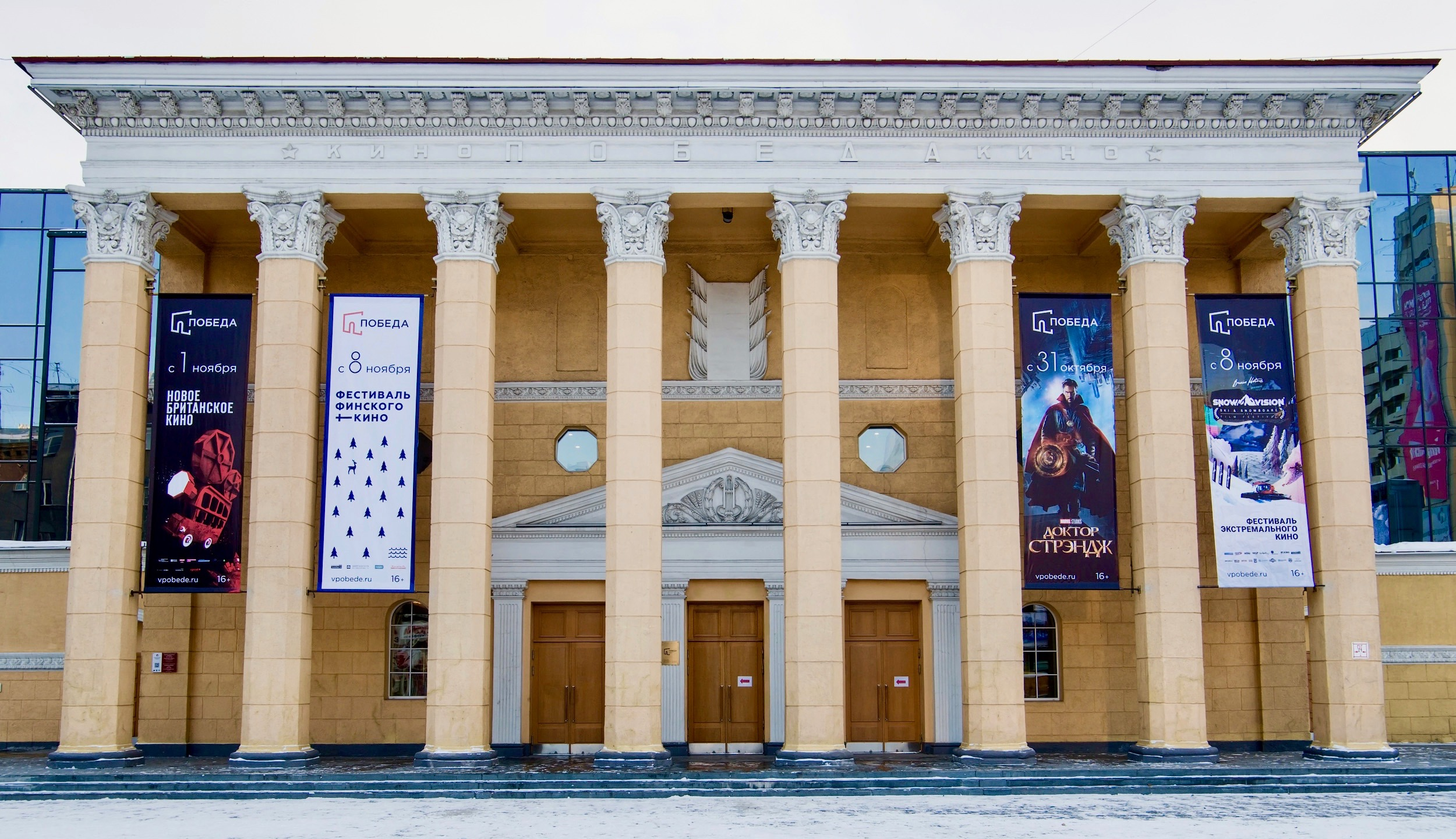
Pobeda Cinema

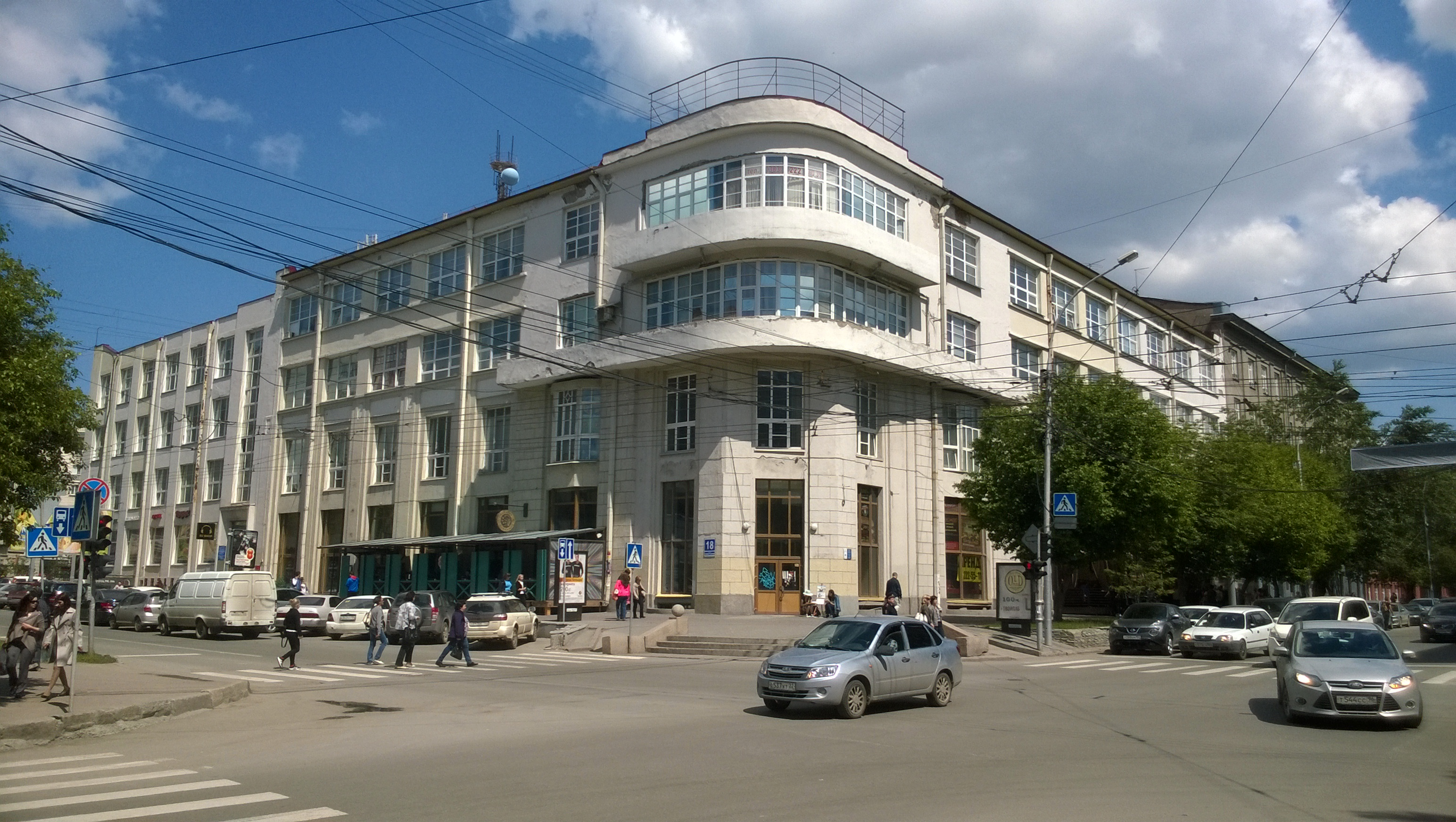
House of Textiles

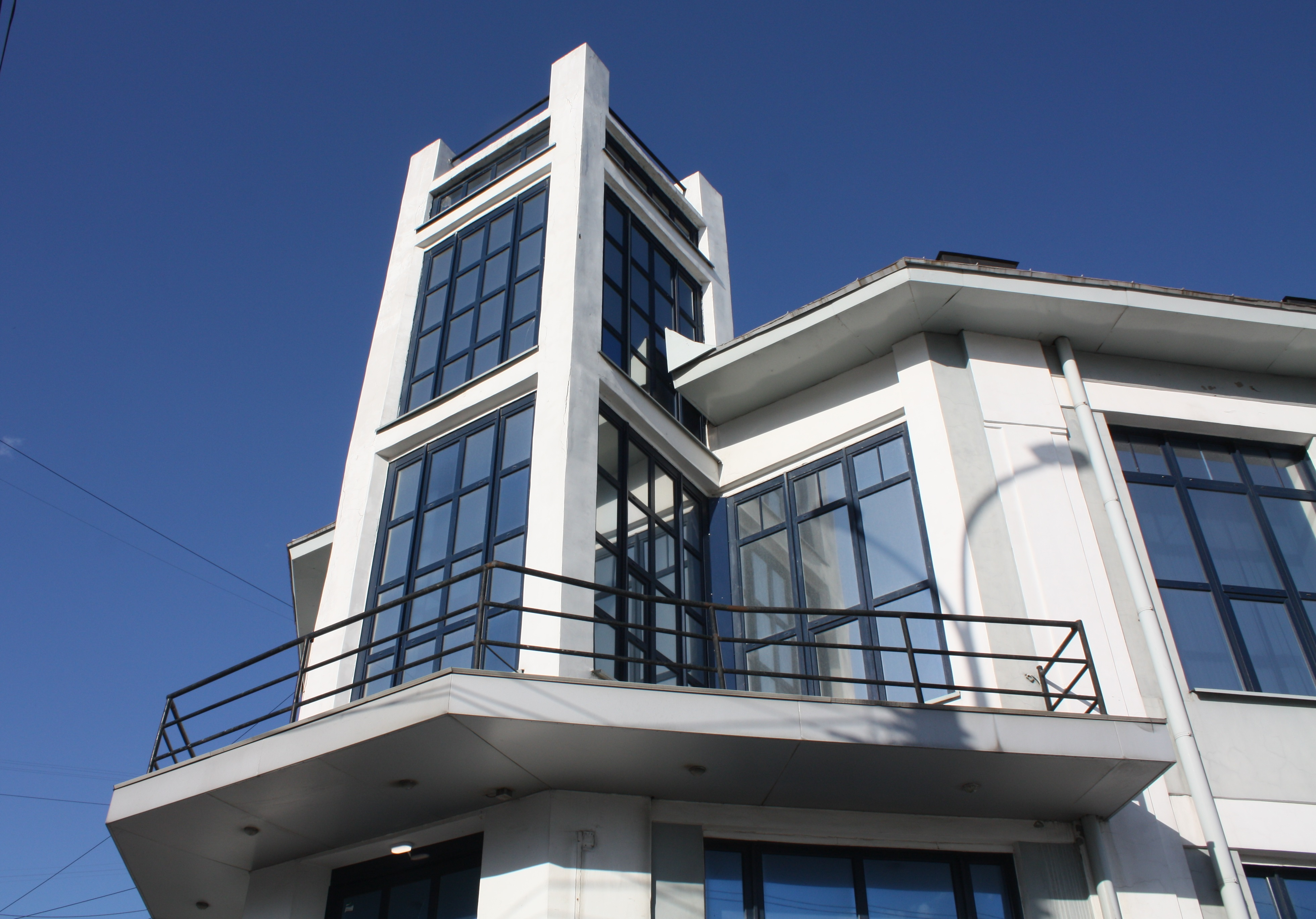
Univermag

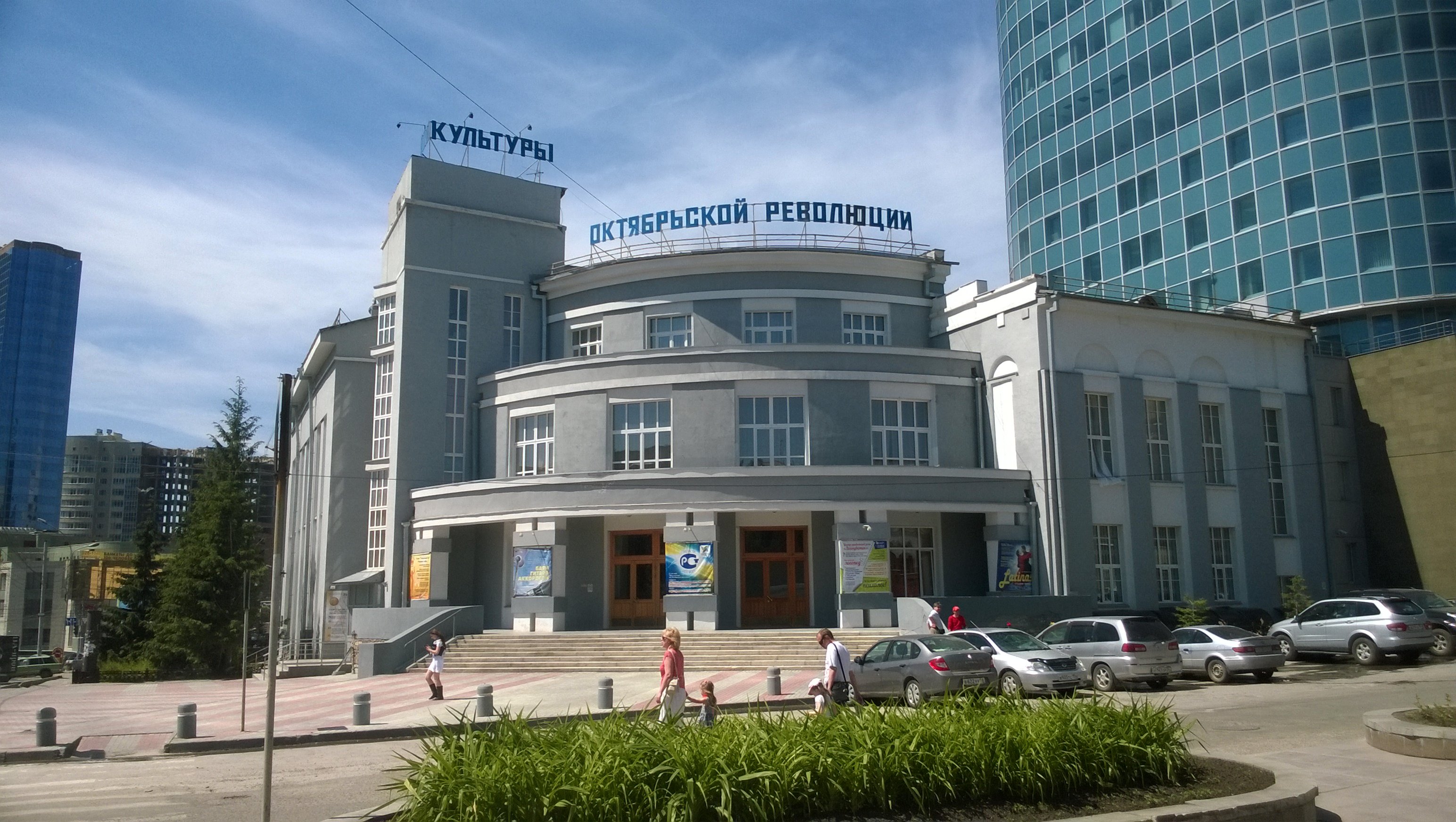
October Revolution House of Culture

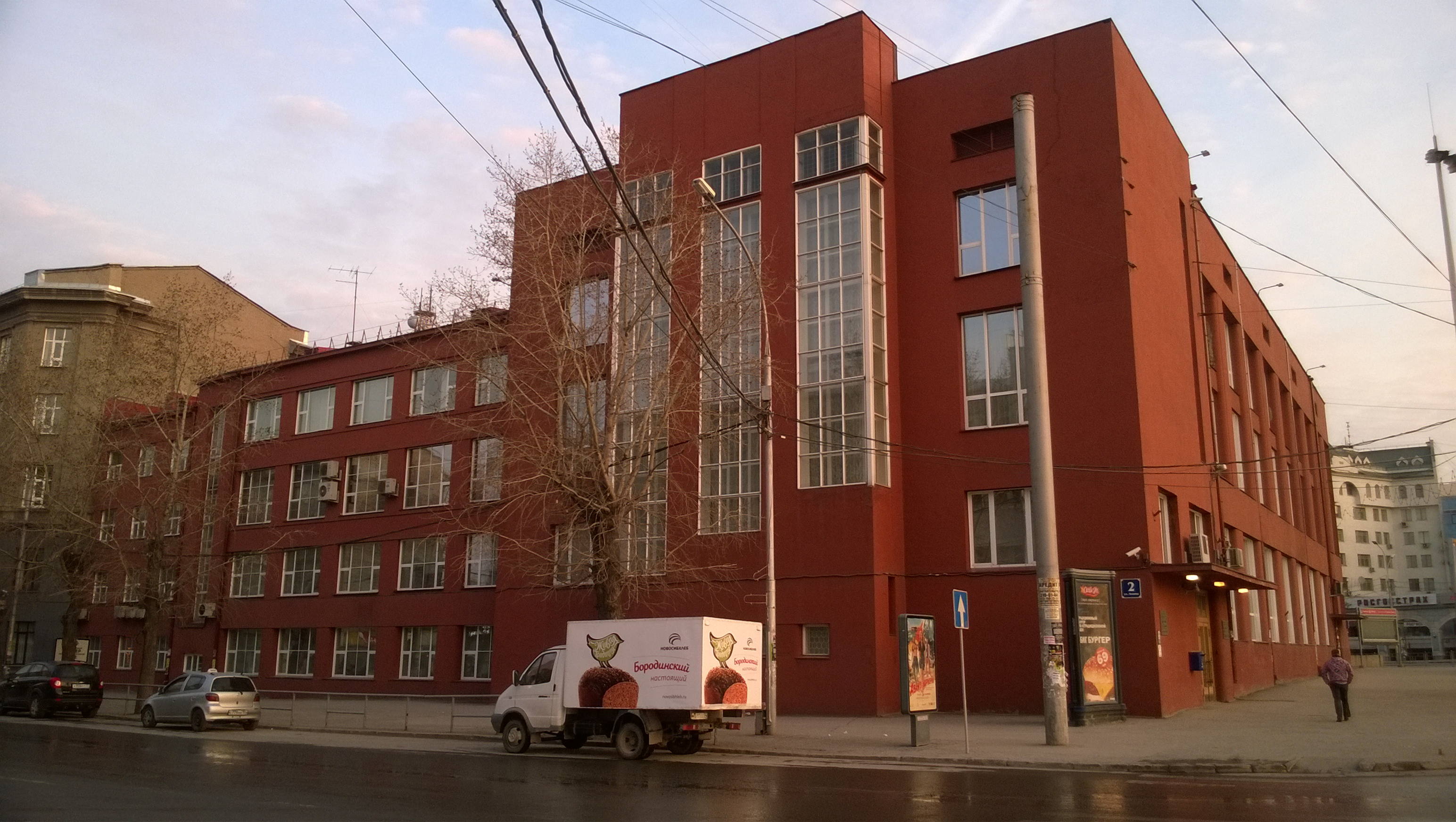
Gosbank Building

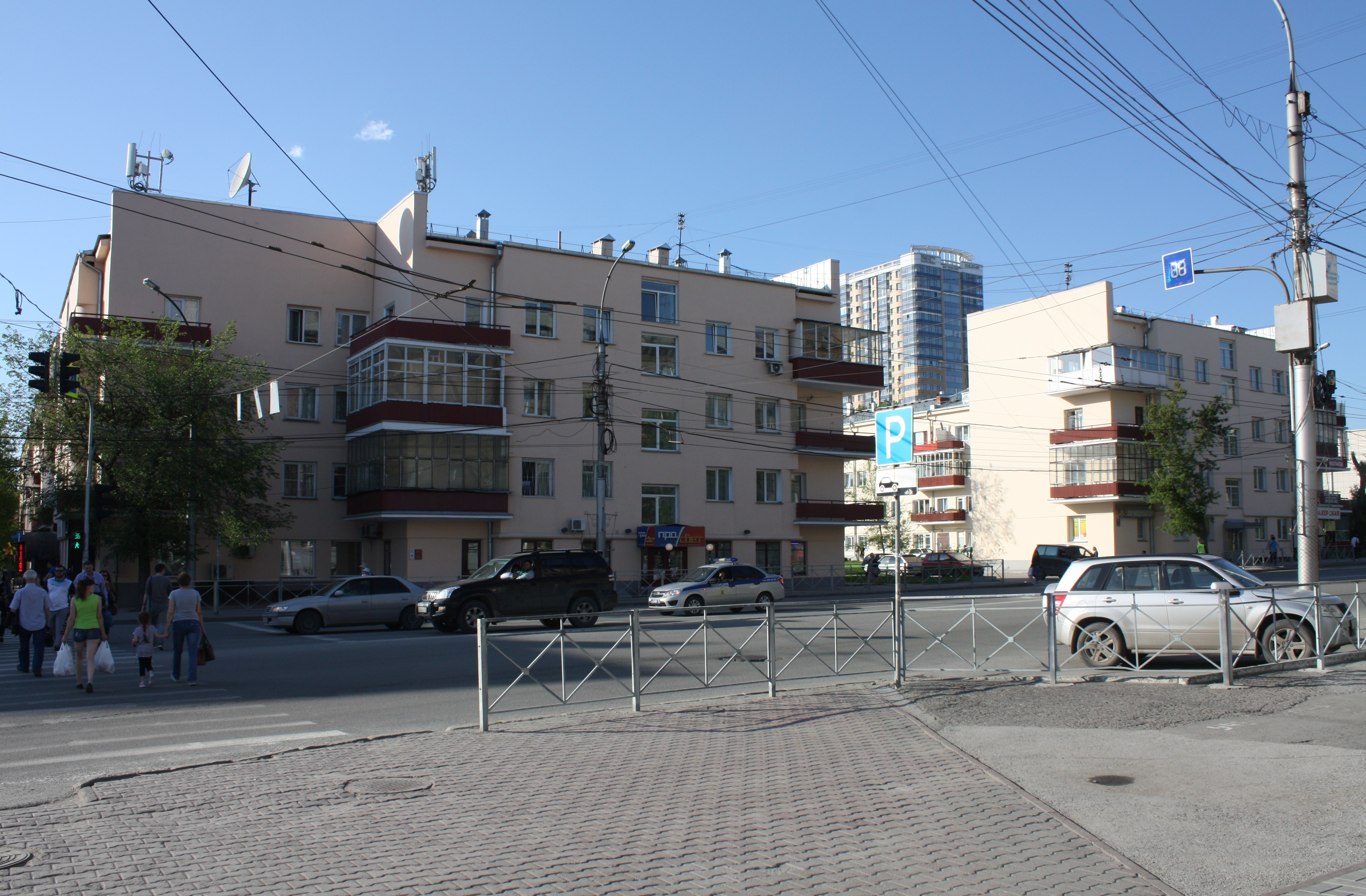
Housing estate near Novosibirsk-Glavny Railway Station

== Theatres ==
- Red Torch Drama Theatre
- Novosibirsk Puppet Theatre
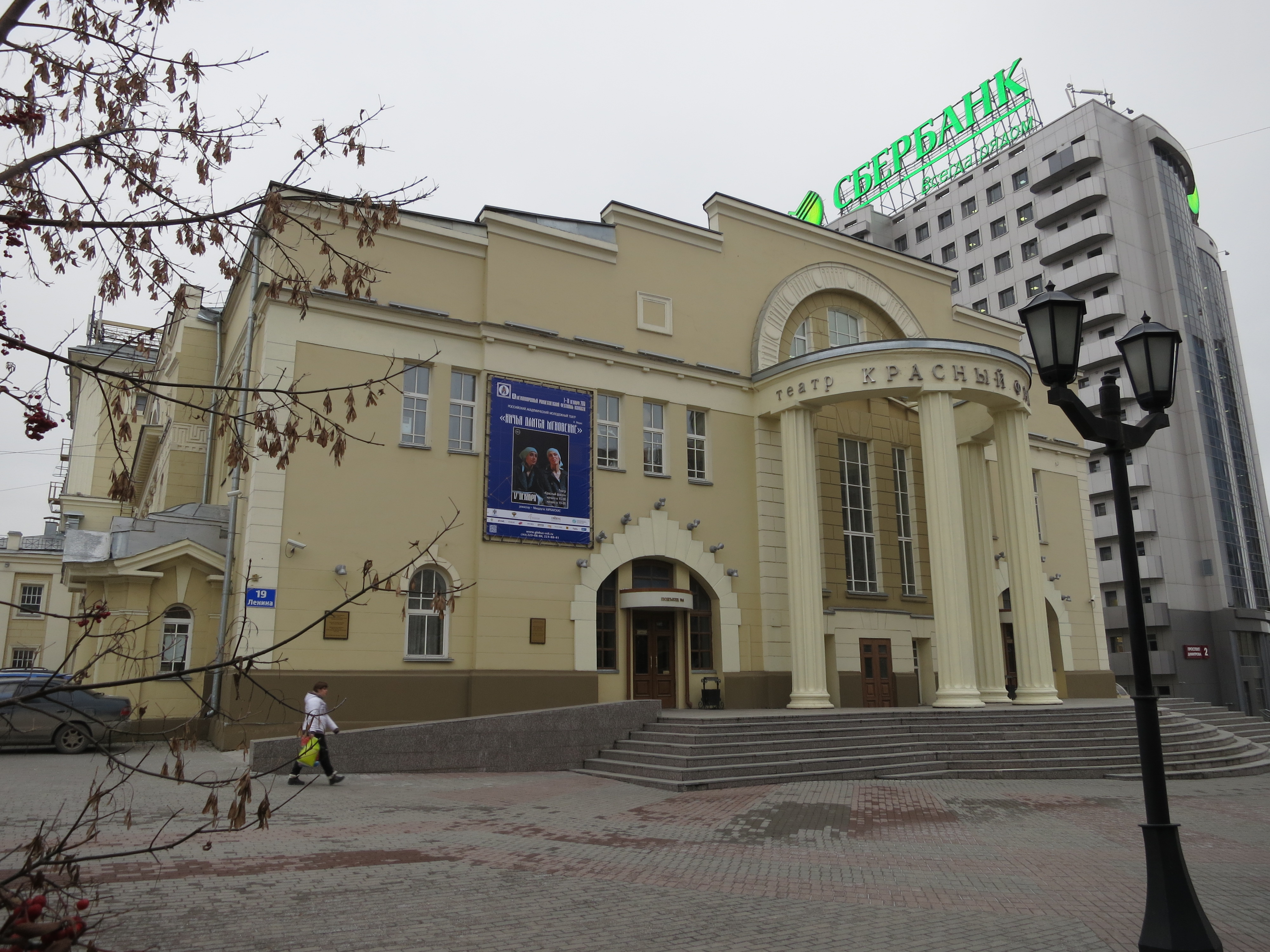
Red Torch Drama Theatre

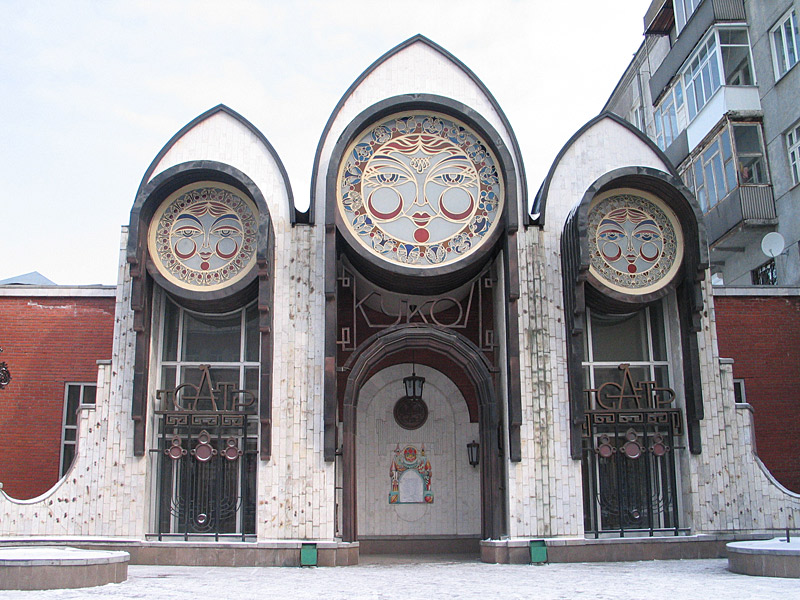
Novosibirsk Puppet Theatre

== Hotels ==
- Central Hotel
- Domina Novosibirsk
- Azimut Hotel Sibir
- Hotel Novosibirsk
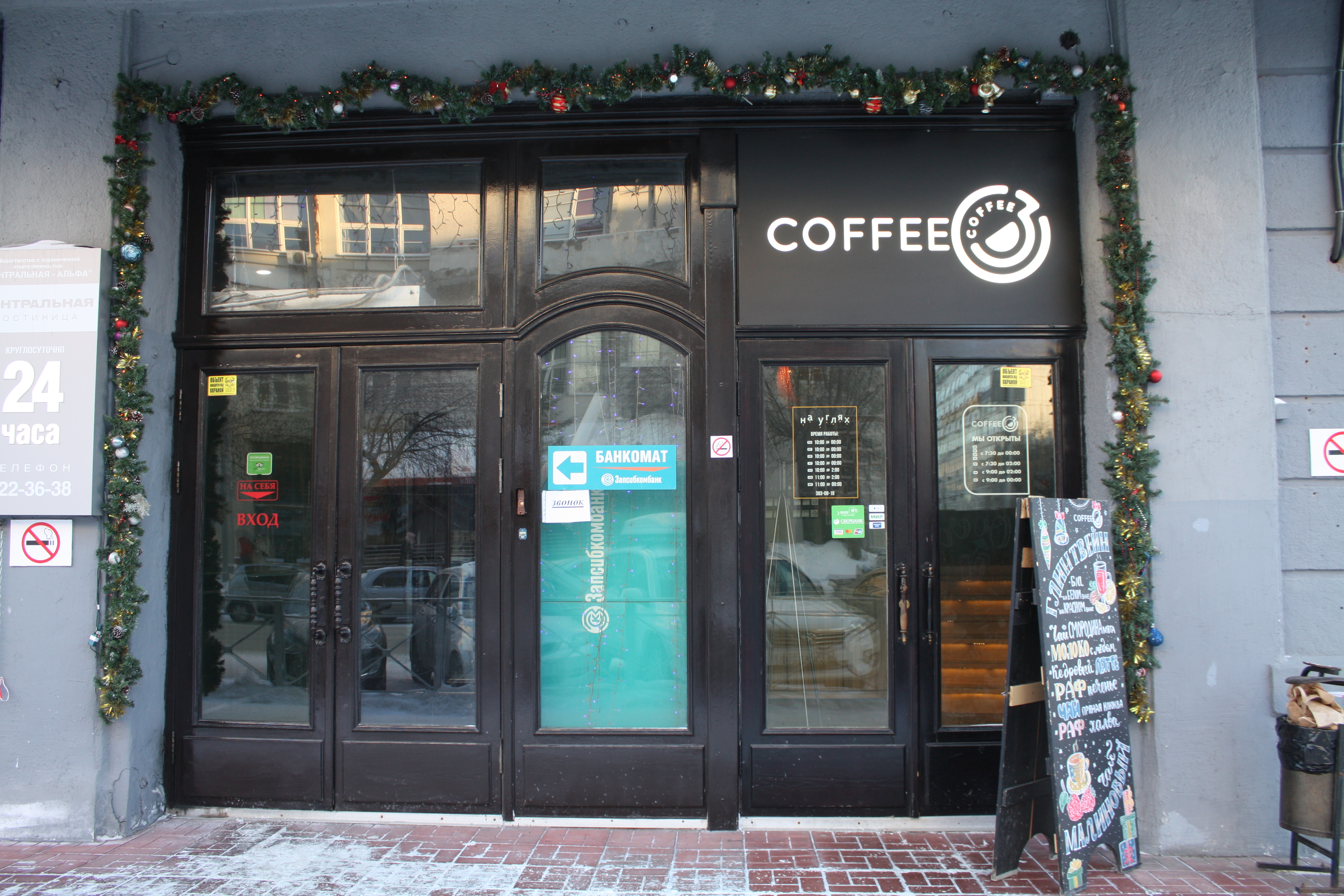
Central Hotel

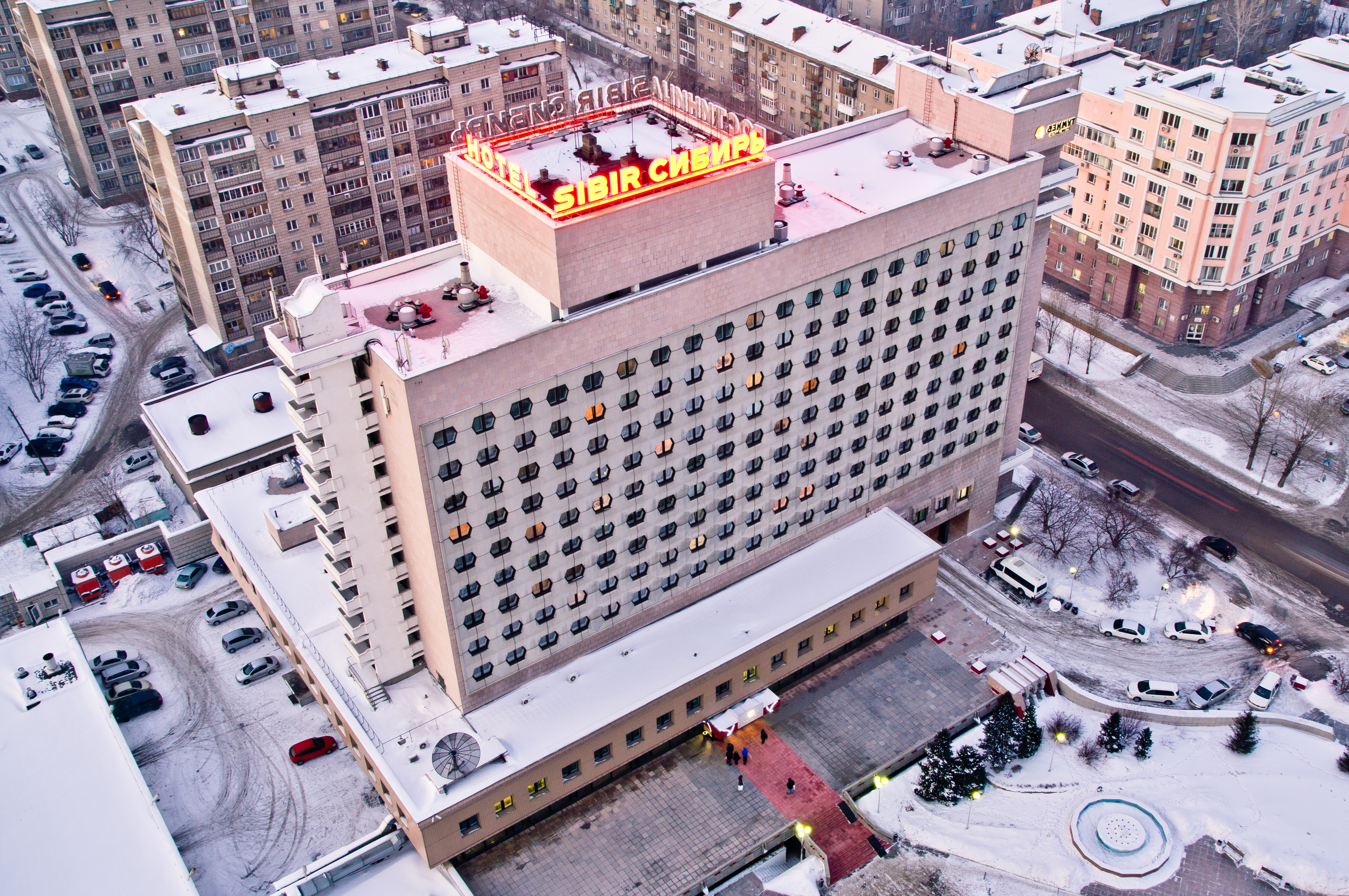
Azimut Hotel Sibir

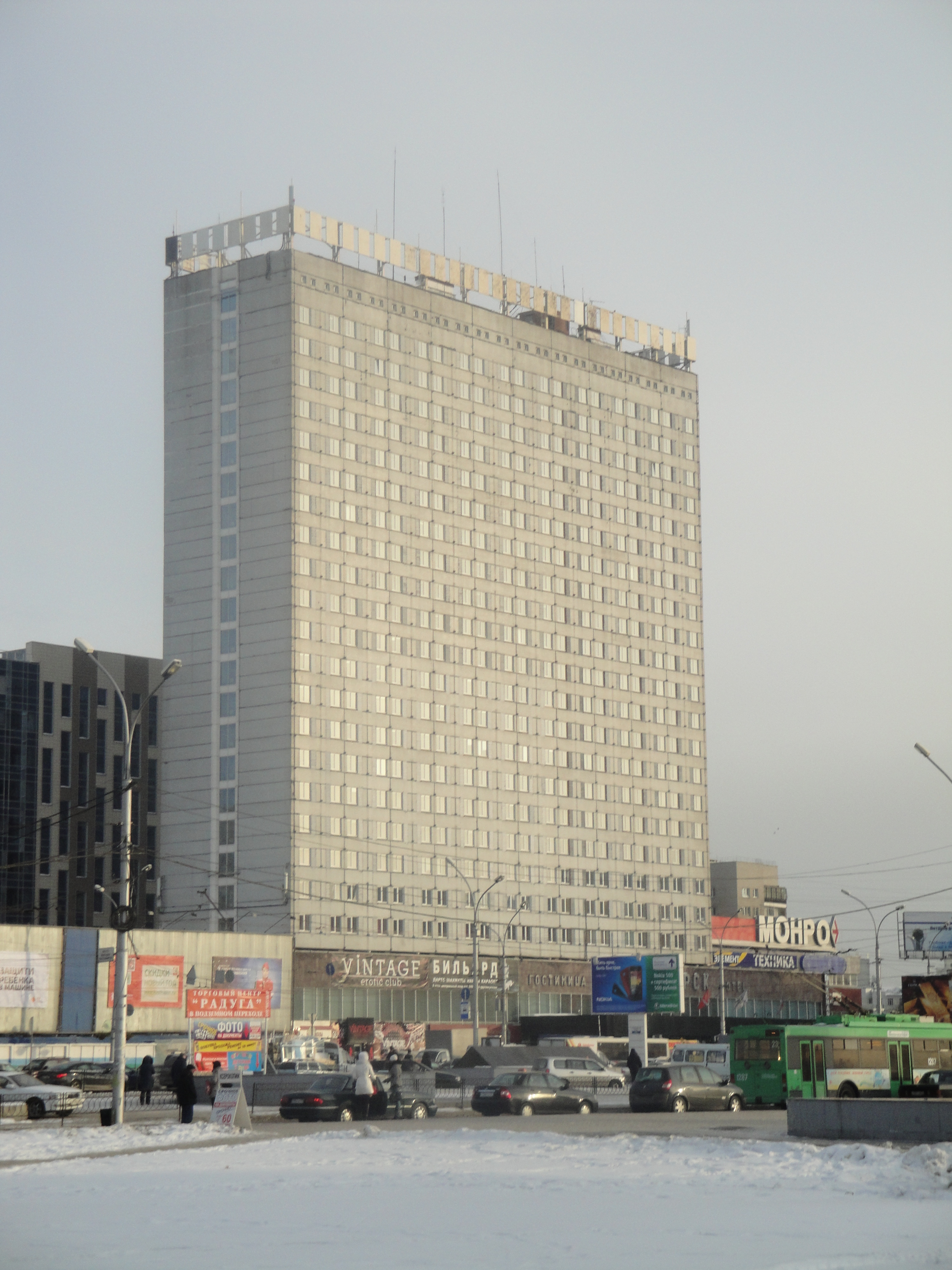
Hotel Novosibirsk

== Organizations ==
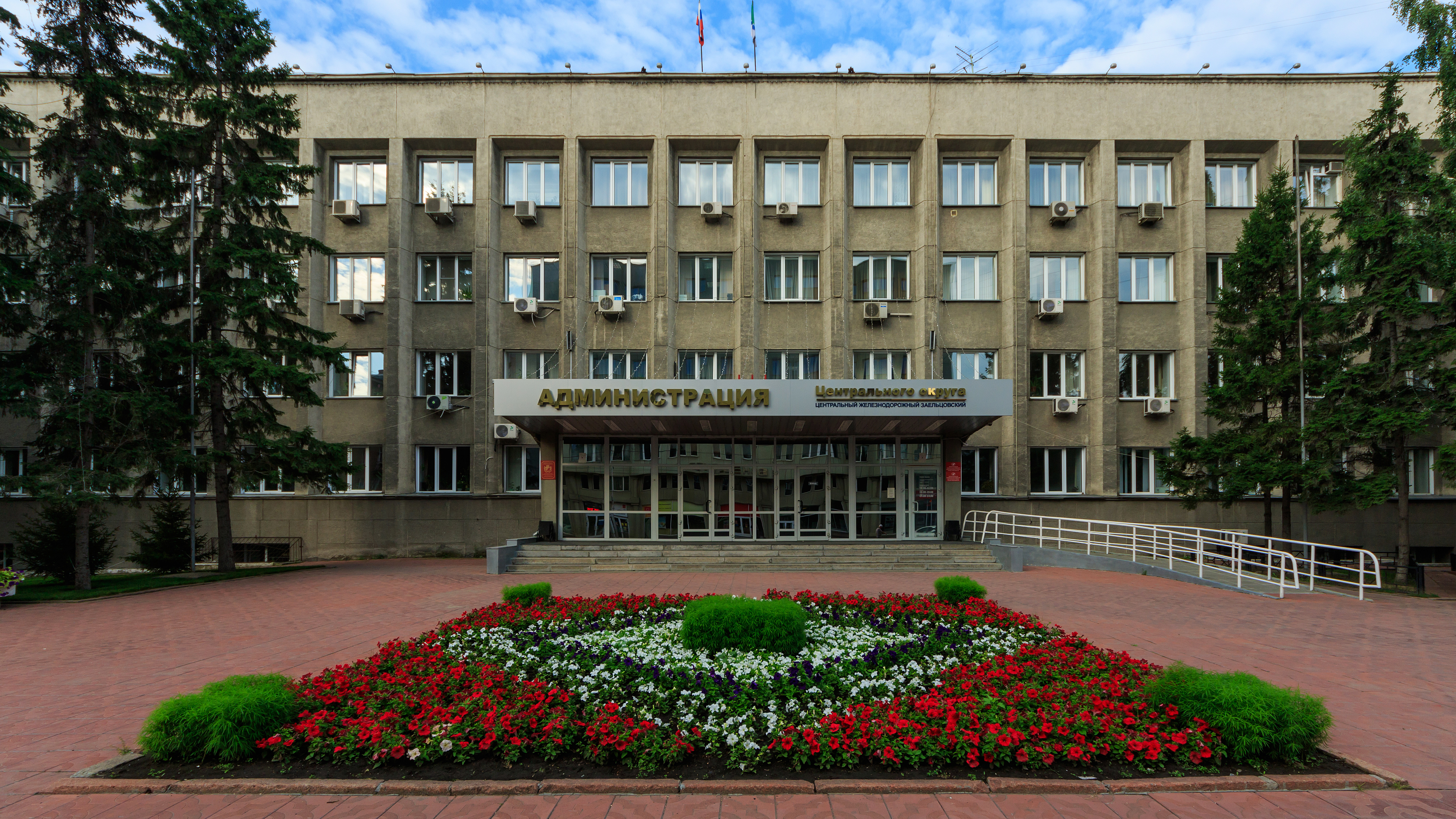
LeninaSt Central Okrug building

- Sibenergosetproject
- Administration of the Central Okrug
- Novosibirsk State Theater Institute

== Transportation ==
=== Railway ===
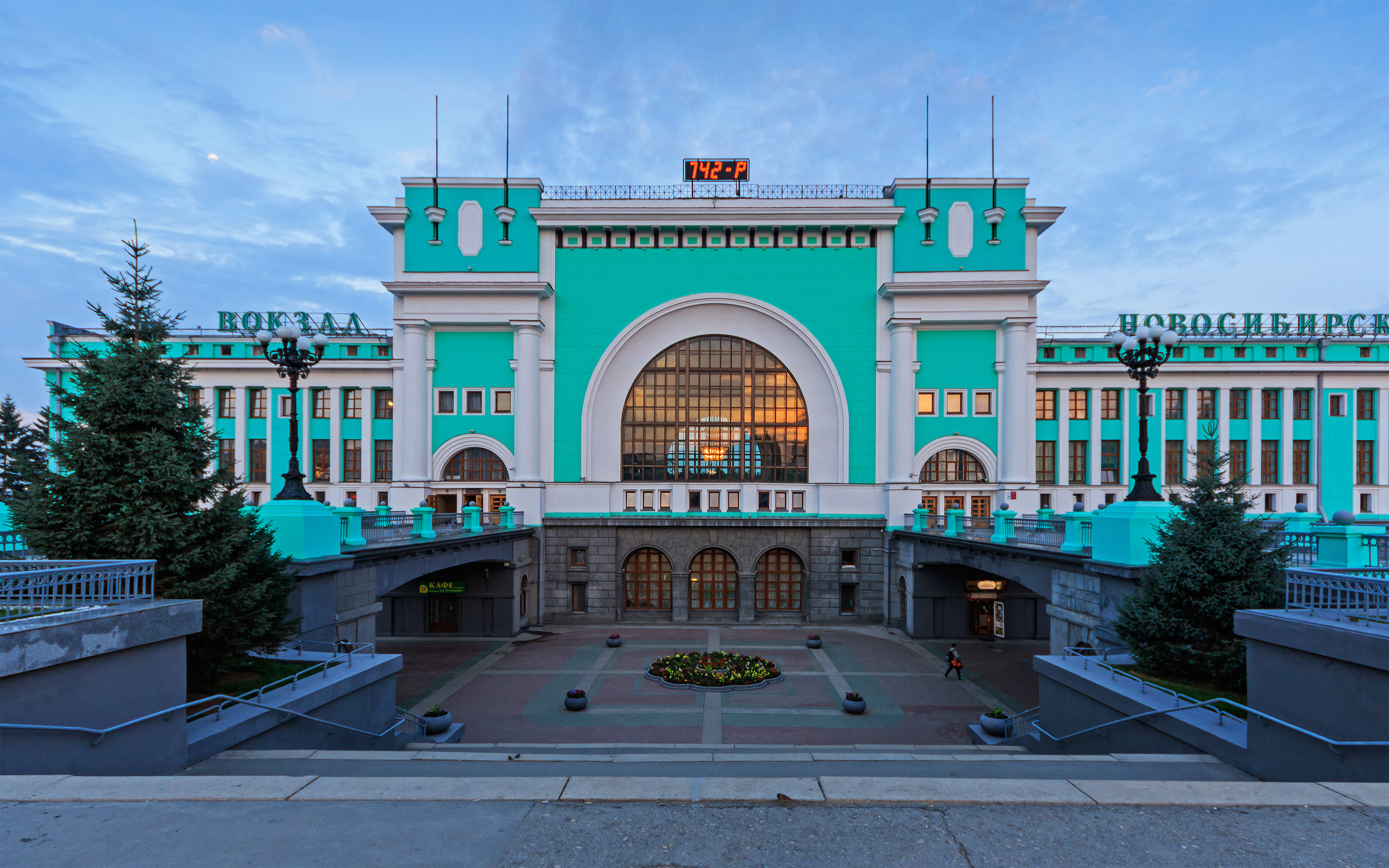
Glavny Station

- Novosibirsk-Glavny

=== Metro ===
- Ploshchad Lenina (two entrances to the station are located between Krasny Avenue, Lenin and Ordzhonikidze streets)
- Ploshchad Garina-Mikhaylovskogo.
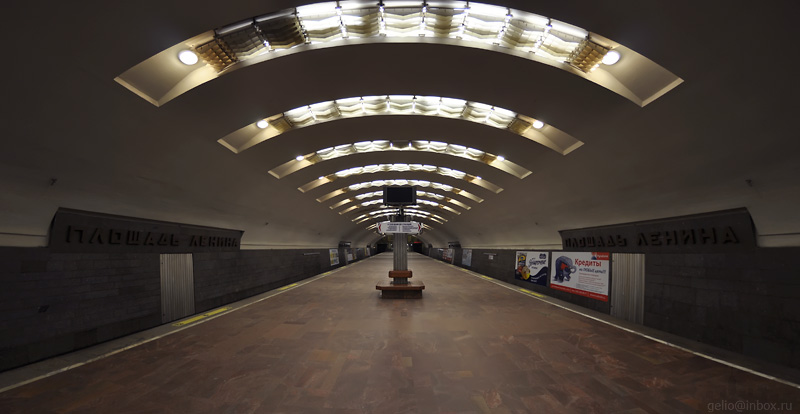
Ploshchad Lenina Station
