= House of Artists, Novosibirsk =

Building in Novosibirsk, Russia

House of Artists
- Дом Артистов (Russian)
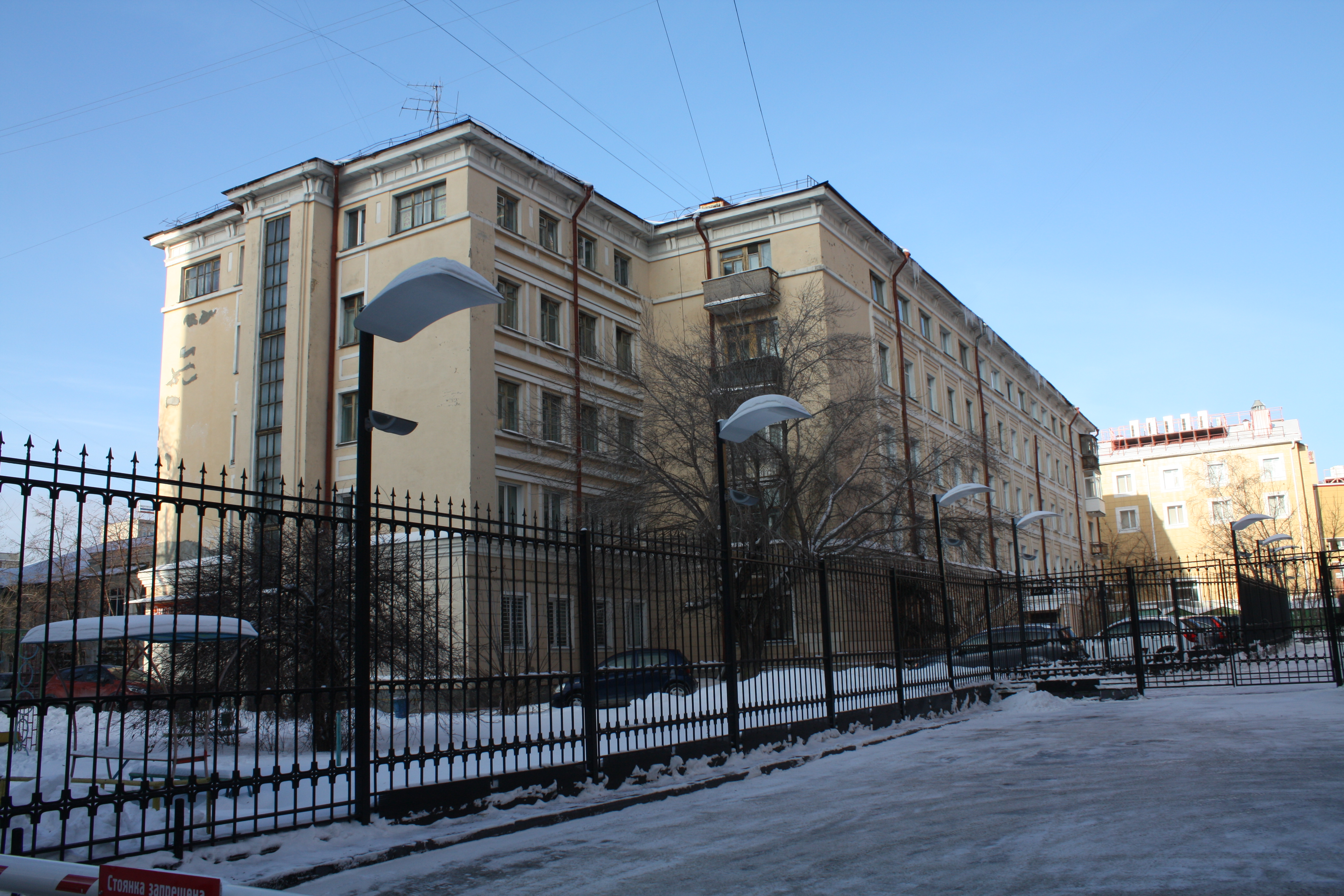
- Interactive map of the House of Artists area

General information
- Location: Novosibirsk, Russia
- Coordinates: 55°02′08″N 82°55′17″E
- Completed: 1930s

House of Artists (Russian: Дом Артистов) is a building in Tsentralny City District of Novosibirsk, Russia. It is located on Romanov Street. The house was built in the 1930s. Architects: B. A. Gordeyev, S. P. Turgenev.

== Location ==
The building is located in a city block between Krasny Avenue and Romanov, Frunze, Michurin streets.

== Gallery ==
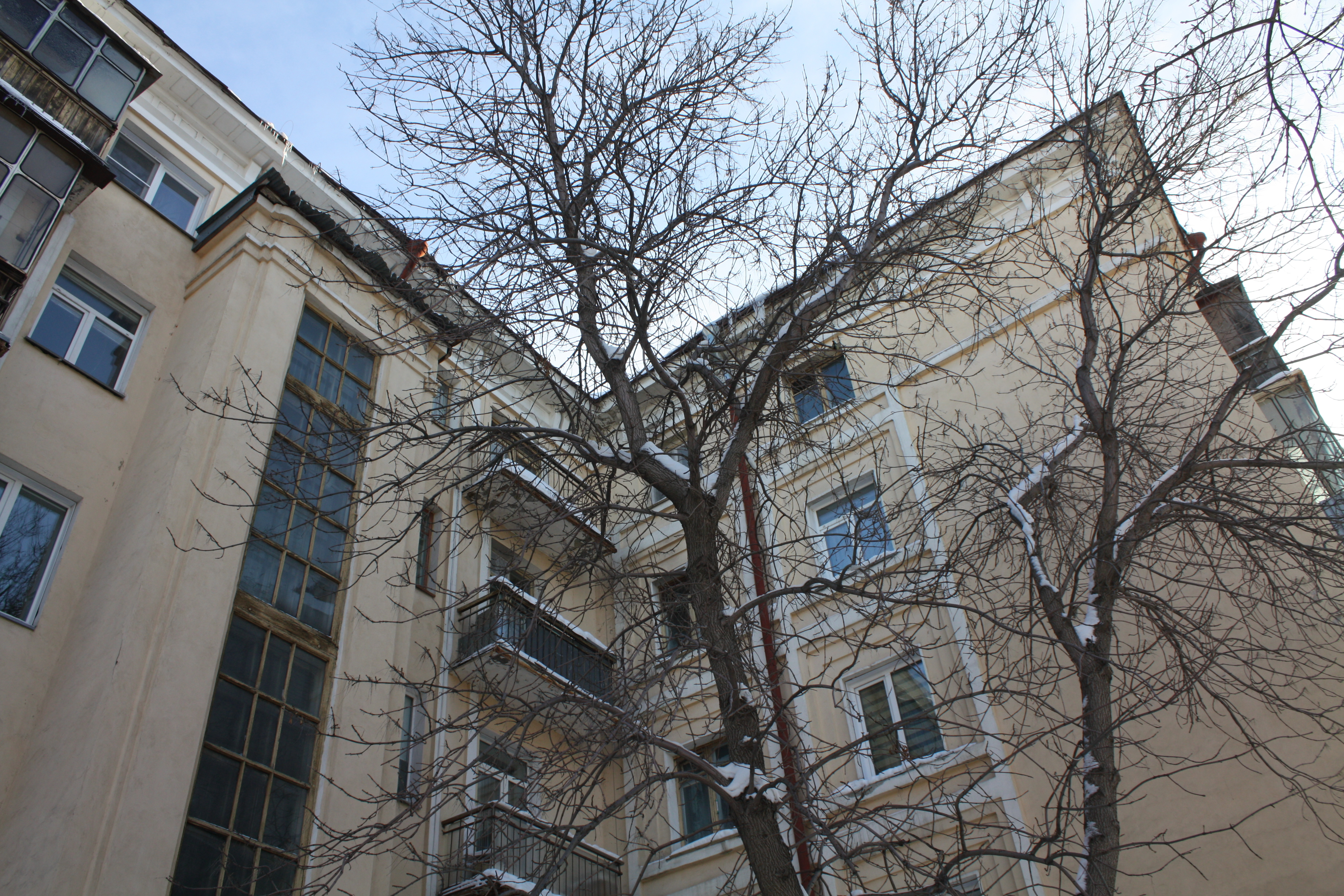

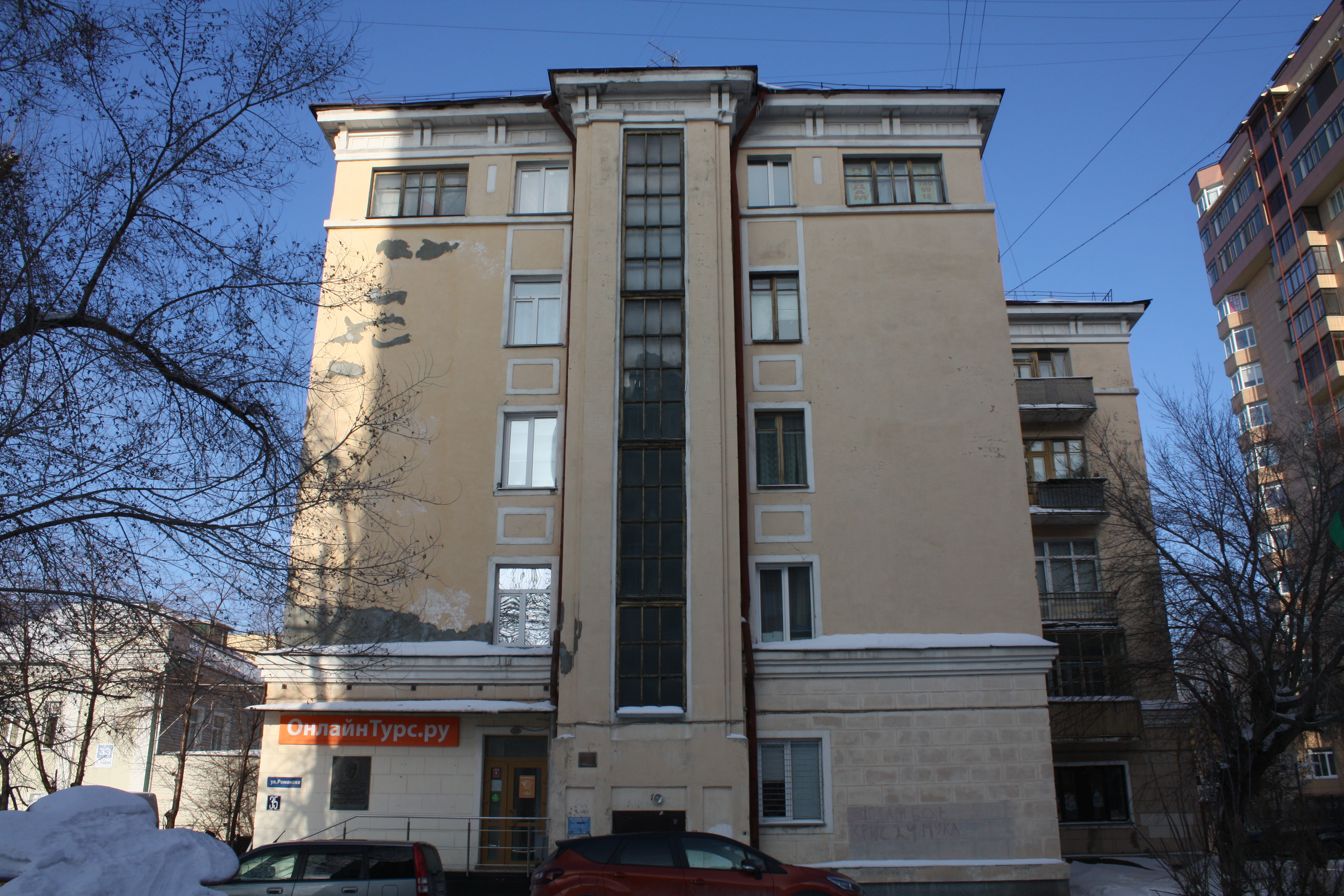

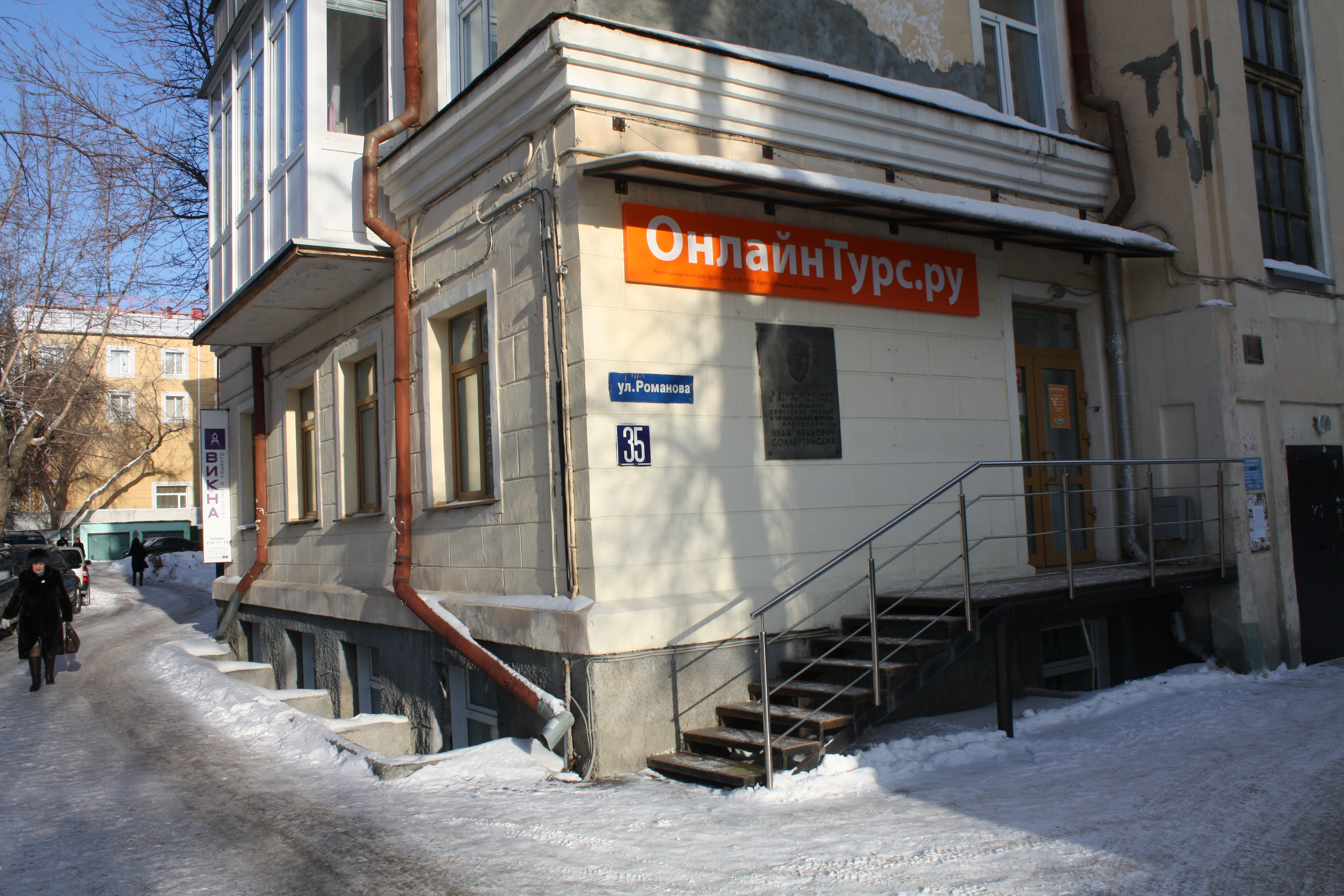

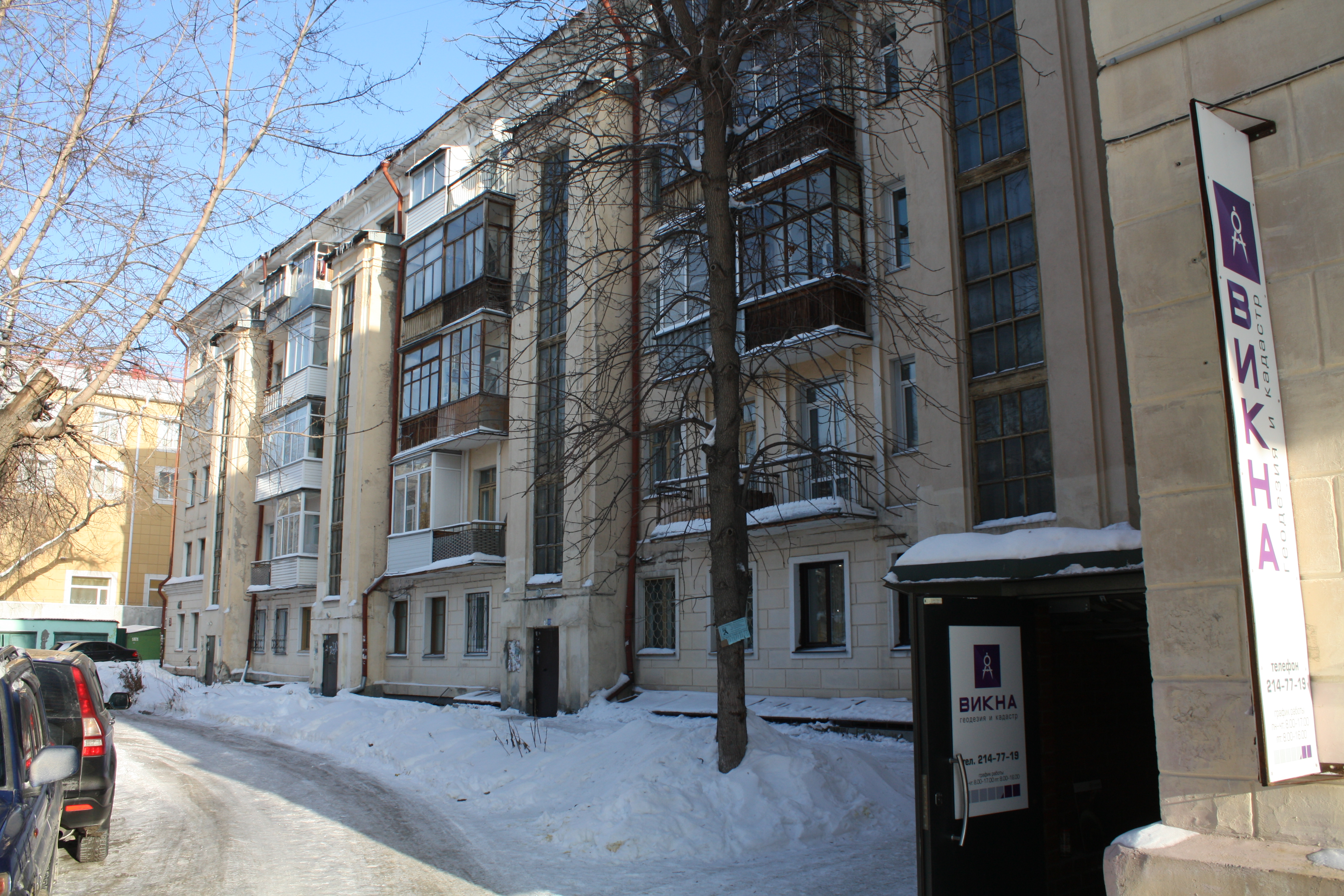

== Notable residents ==
- Ivan Sollertinsky (1902–1944), a Russian polymath of the Soviet period. He lived in the house from 1941 to 1944.

== See also ==
- Polyclinic No. 1
- Aeroflot House
- Gosbank Building
- Soyuzzoloto House
