= Traveler's Coffee =

Russian coffee shop chain

Traveler’s Coffee
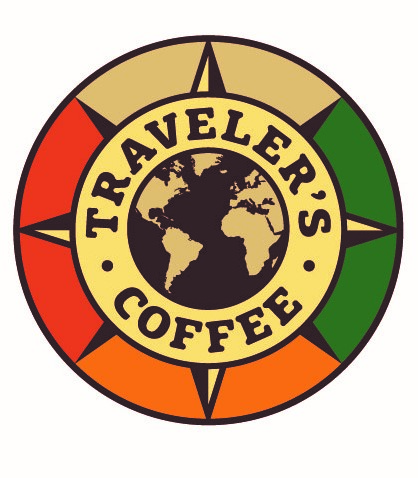
- Founded: 1997
- Founder: Christopher Michael Tara-Browne
- Products: coffee

Traveler's Coffee is a Russian coffee shop chain based in Novosibirsk, Russia, founded in 1997 (or 2000) by American entrepreneur Christopher Michael Tara-Browne. The chain's coffee shops operate in Russia, Kazakhstan, Ukraine, Azerbaijan and Germany.

== History ==
The coffee chain was founded in Novosibirsk in 1997 by the executive director of the New York Pizza, also located in Russia, Christopher Michael Tara-Browne and his wife Svetlana.

In 2001, the first separate cafe of the chain was opened on Krasny Prospekt 86b near the Gagarinskaya Metro Station. In the same year a roasting facility was established in Koltsovo, Novosibirsk Oblast.

In 2007, another cafe of the company was opened, it occupied the spacious premises of the former Zolotoy Koloss Store (Lenin Street 6).

== Operation ==
Traveler’s Coffee works in specialty segment.

=== Speciality Coffee ===
Traveler's Coffee supplies freshly roasted coffee beans and equipment to hundreds of partners. The company's employees visit the plantations from which coffee is supplied.

=== Roasting production ===
The roasting shop of the Traveler's Coffee company produces about 600 kg of specialty coffee every work shift. Within a few days after roasting, fresh coffee is delivered to the company's partners and to the chain's coffee shops.

The roast masters of Traveler's Coffee have twice become Russian roasting champions. In 2019 the current roasting master of the company, Arseny Kuznetsov, became the world champion in roasting.

=== Delivery of HoReCa goods ===
Traveler's Coffee is a representative of the Bodum trademark, an exclusive supplier of Philibert de Routin syrups, professional Mazzer coffee grinders and, until August 1, 2015 was a supplier of La Marzocco equipment in Russia. The company also sells Speciality class coffee of its own roasting, leaf tea and confectionery products.

=== Traveler’s Coffee Coffee shop chain ===
As of December 1, 2019 the Traveler's Coffee chain had 101 coffee shops in 45 cities of Russia, Azerbaijan, Kazakhstan and Germany. In Russia the Traveler's Coffee coffee chain is represented in cities such as Novosibirsk, Moscow, Irkutsk, Krasnoyarsk, Novokuznetsk, Surgut, Omsk, Ufa, Samara, Kostroma, Yakutsk and others.

The menu of Traveler's Coffee coffee houses includes speciality coffee, original coffee drinks, sandwiches, breakfasts, salads, soups, hot dishes and desserts.

=== Traveler’s Coffee outside of Russia ===
Traveler's Coffee entered the international level in 2008, opening its first representative office outside Russia — in Baku, Azerbaijan. In March 2016 the company opened a coffee shop in Frankfurt am Main. And in November 2019 - in Nuremberg.

Currently Traveler's Coffee is present in countries:

- Russia
- Azerbaijan (since 2008)
- Kazakhstan (since 2011)
- Kyrgyzstan (since 2015)
- Germany (since 2016)
- Uzbekistan (since 2025)

== Gallery ==
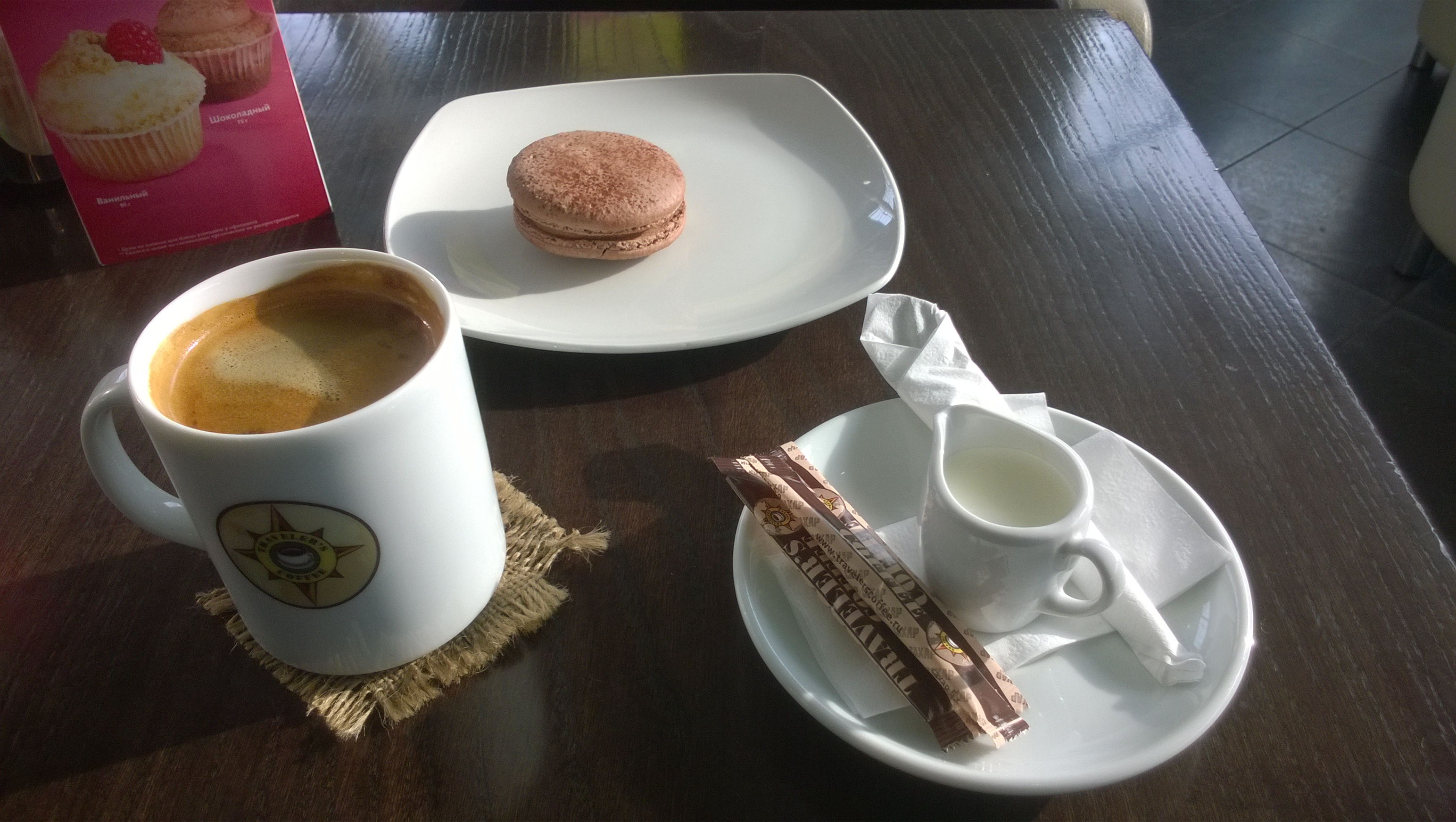

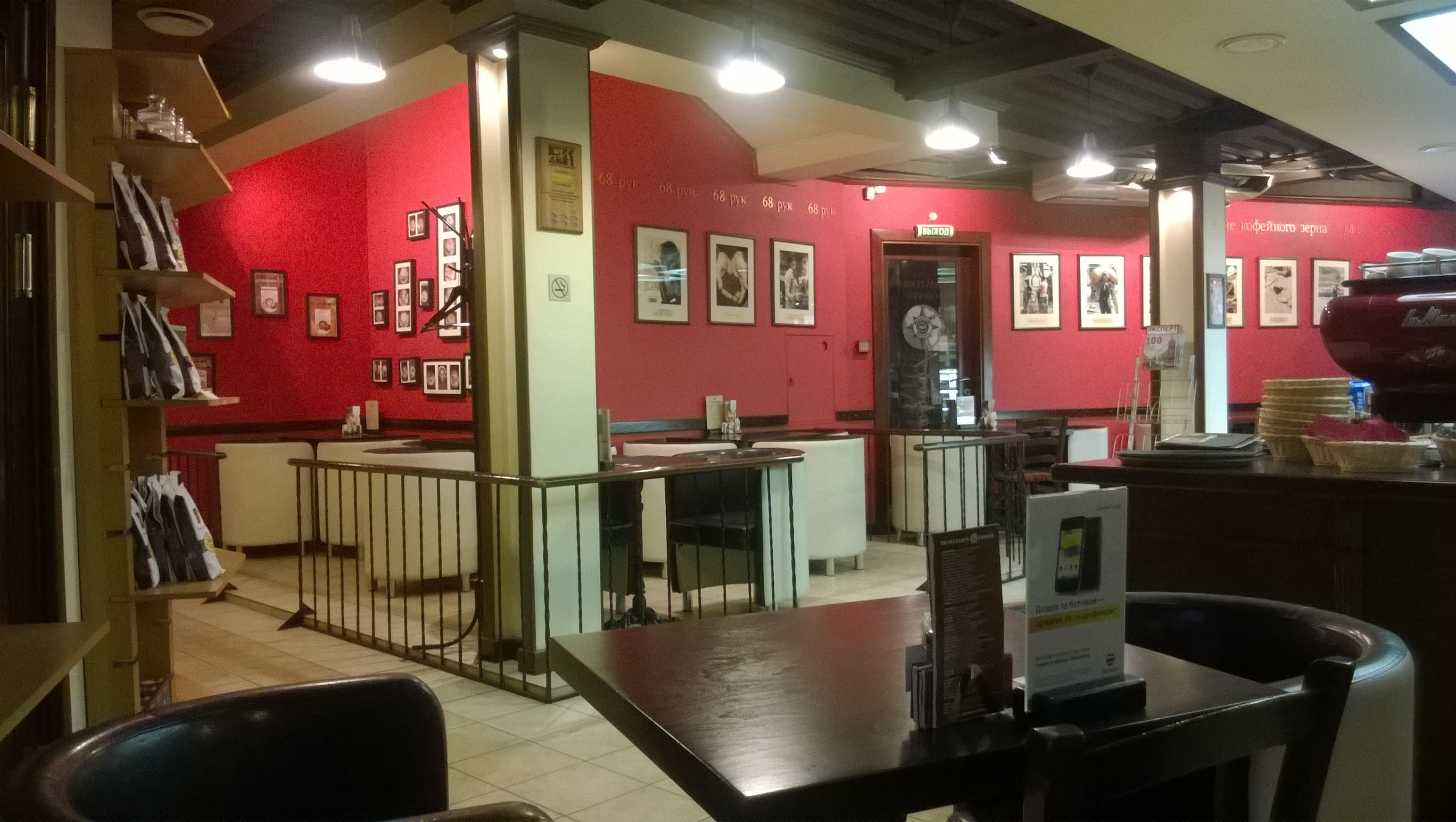

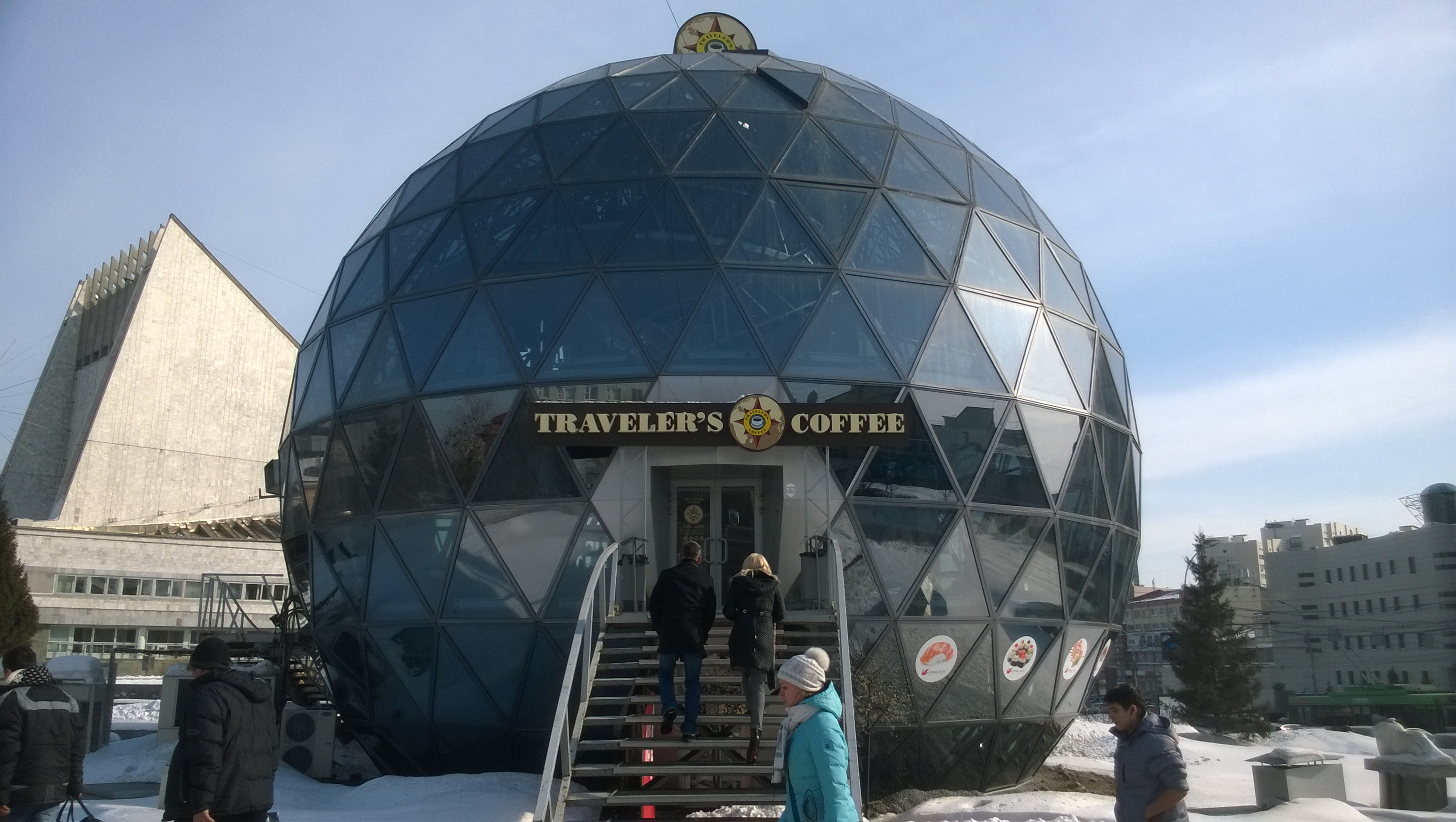

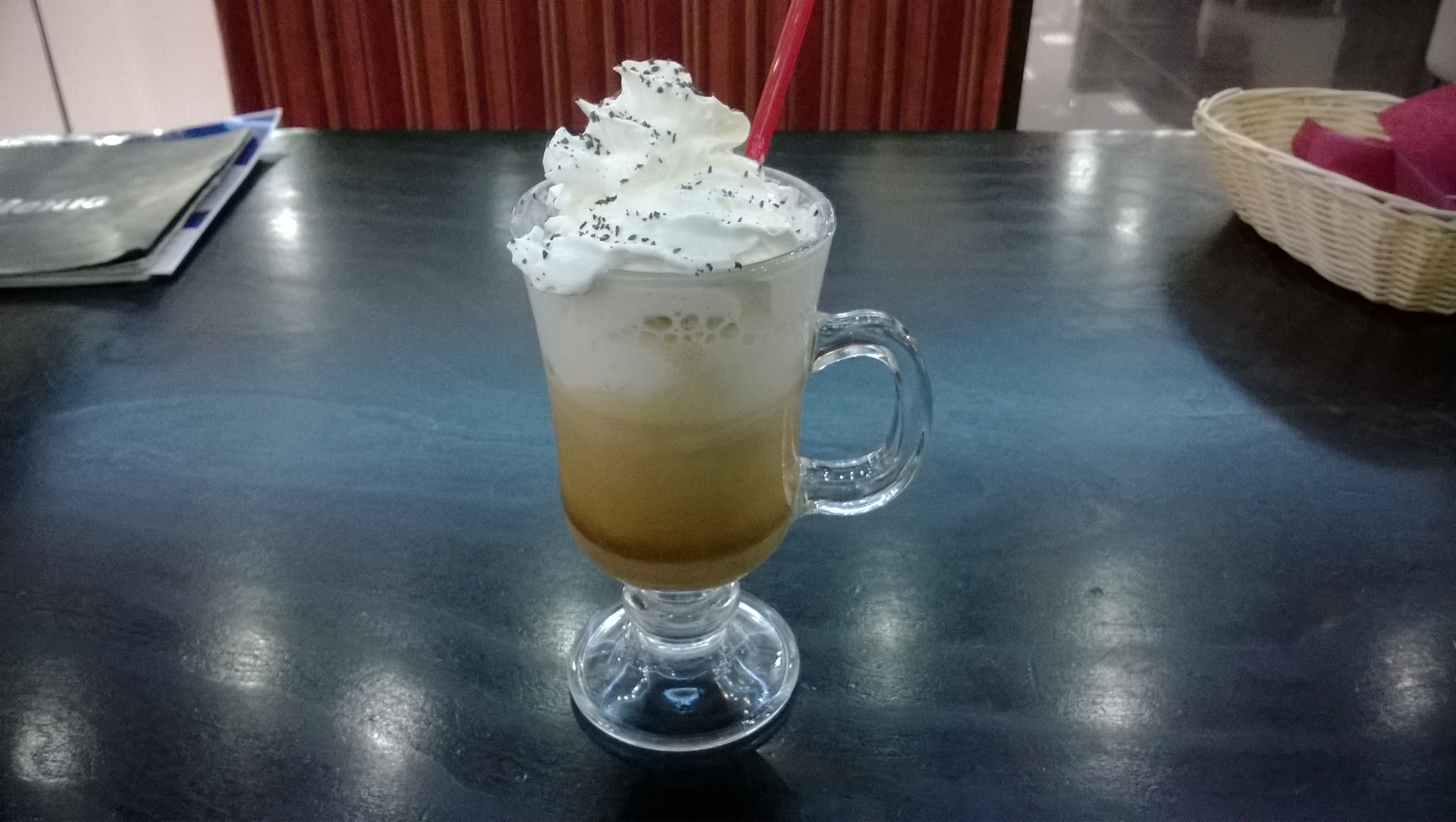

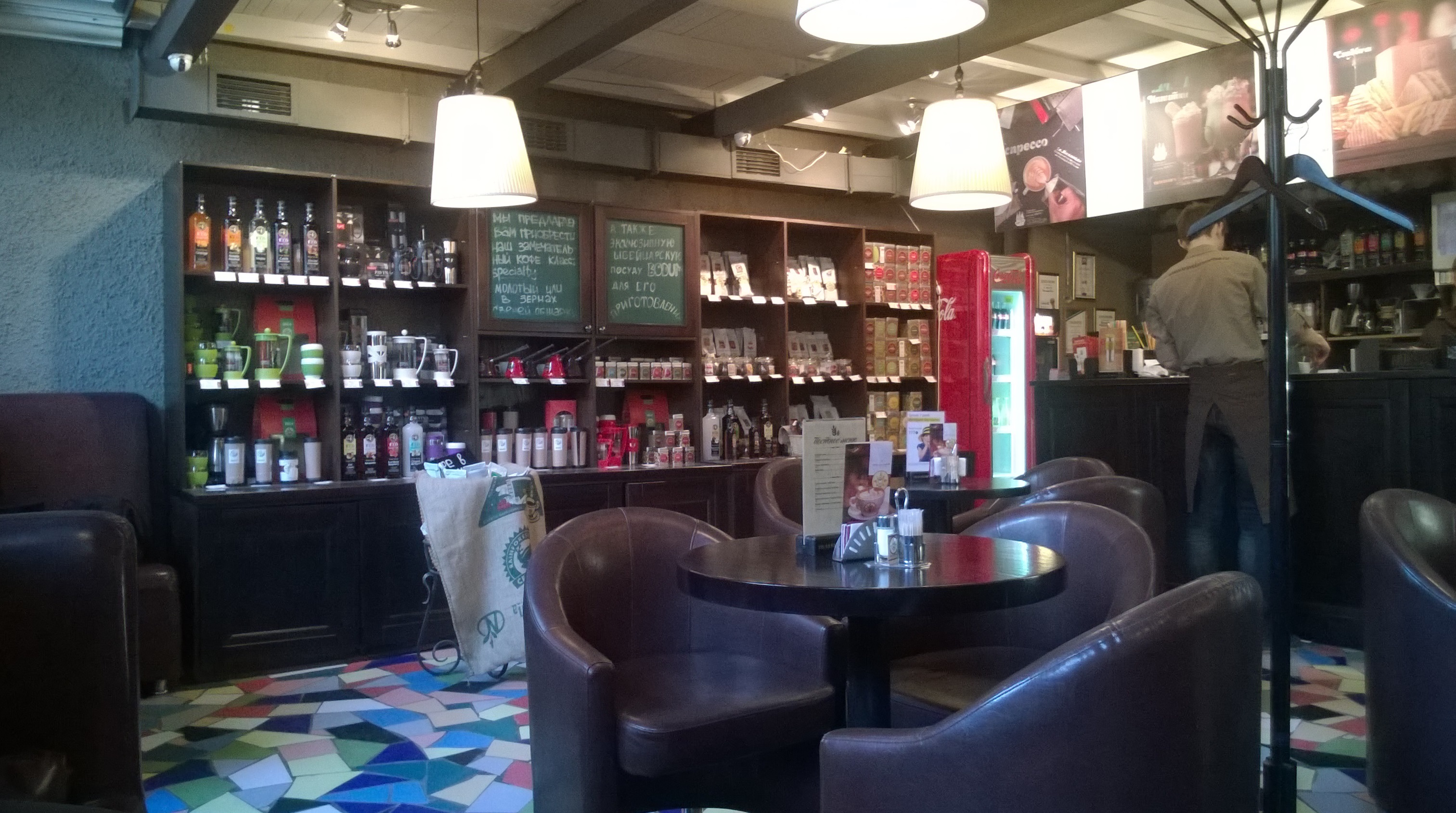
