= Sovetskaya Street, Novosibirsk =

Street in Novosibirsk, Russia

Sovetskaya Street
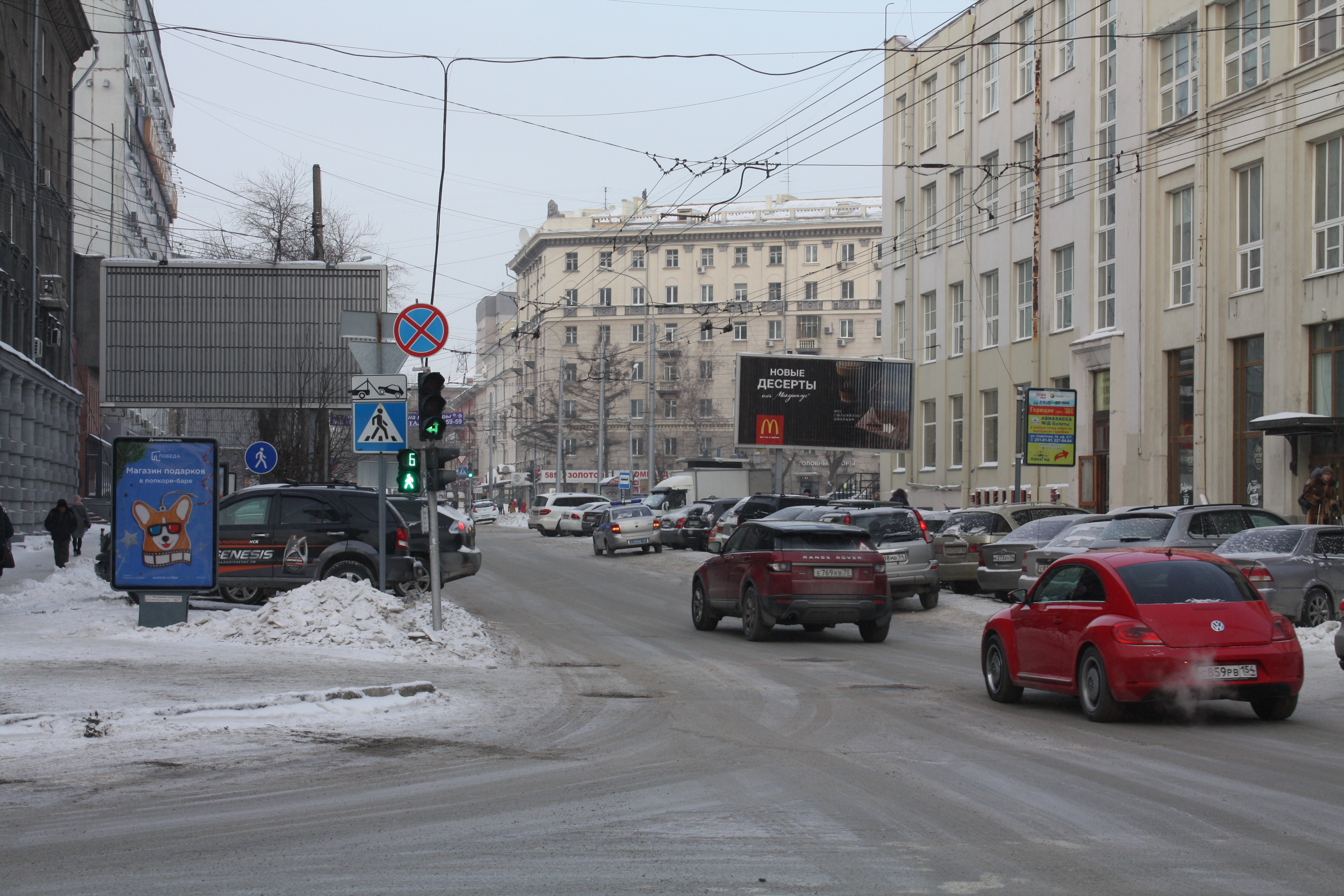
- Interactive map of Sovetskaya Street
- Native name: Советская улица (Russian)
- Location: Novosibirsk; Russia

Sovetskaya Street (Russian: Советская улица) is a street in Novosibirsk, Russia. It branches off from Krasny Avenue near the Alexander Nevsky Cathedral and then runs north parallel to it. Sovetskaya Street ends at the intersection with Zheleznodorozhnaya and Pisarev streets.

Sovetskaya Street is the border between the Tsentralny and Zheleznodorozhny districts of the city.

== History ==
The street was previously called the Kabinetskaya Street.

== Architecture ==
=== Residential and public buildings ===
Several historic buildings are located along Sovetskaya Street, spanning more than a century of architectural development. The Vagin House, situated on the corner of Sovetskaya and Kommunisticheskaya Street, was built in 1903. The Kryukov House, on the corner of Sovetskaya and Gorky streets, was built in 1908 by the merchant Kryukov.

Several buildings on the street were designed by architect Andrey Kryachkov. The City School Building was constructed in 1912. The Main Post Office, located on the corner of Sovetskaya and Lenin streets, was built in 1916. Kryachkov also designed the Sibdalgostorg Building, now home to the Novosibirsk Conservatory, which was built in 1924.

The Kondratyuk House was built in 1924–1925; Yuri Kondratyuk lived and worked there from 1927 to 1930. The House of Textiles, also on the corner of Sovetskaya and Lenin streets, was built in 1926. A neoclassical hospital building was constructed on the street in 1928. The neoclassical building at Sovetskaya Street 12, on the corner with Chaplygin Street, dates to 1955. The building at Sovetskaya Street 8 was constructed in 2011.

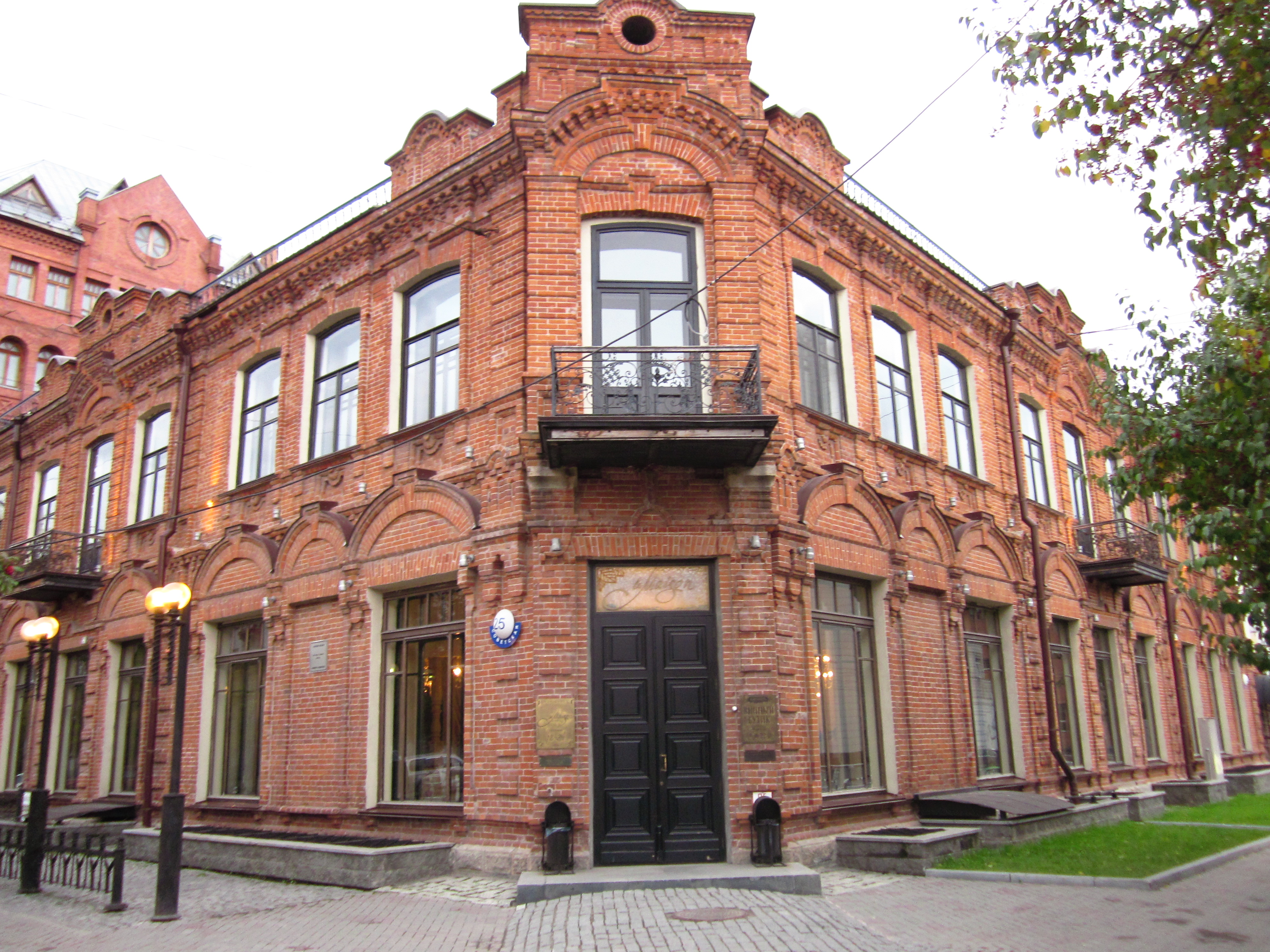
Kryukov House

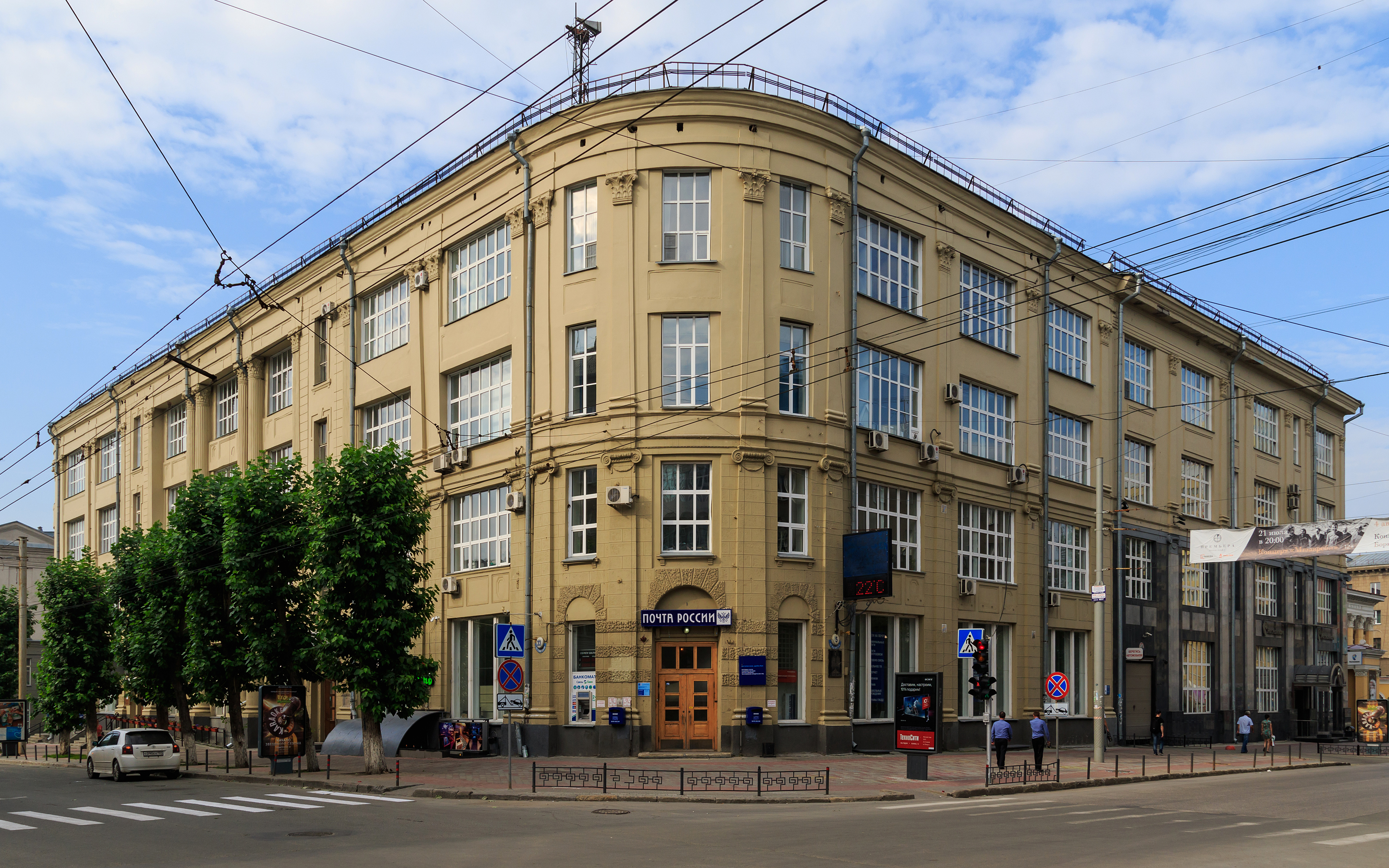
Main Post Office

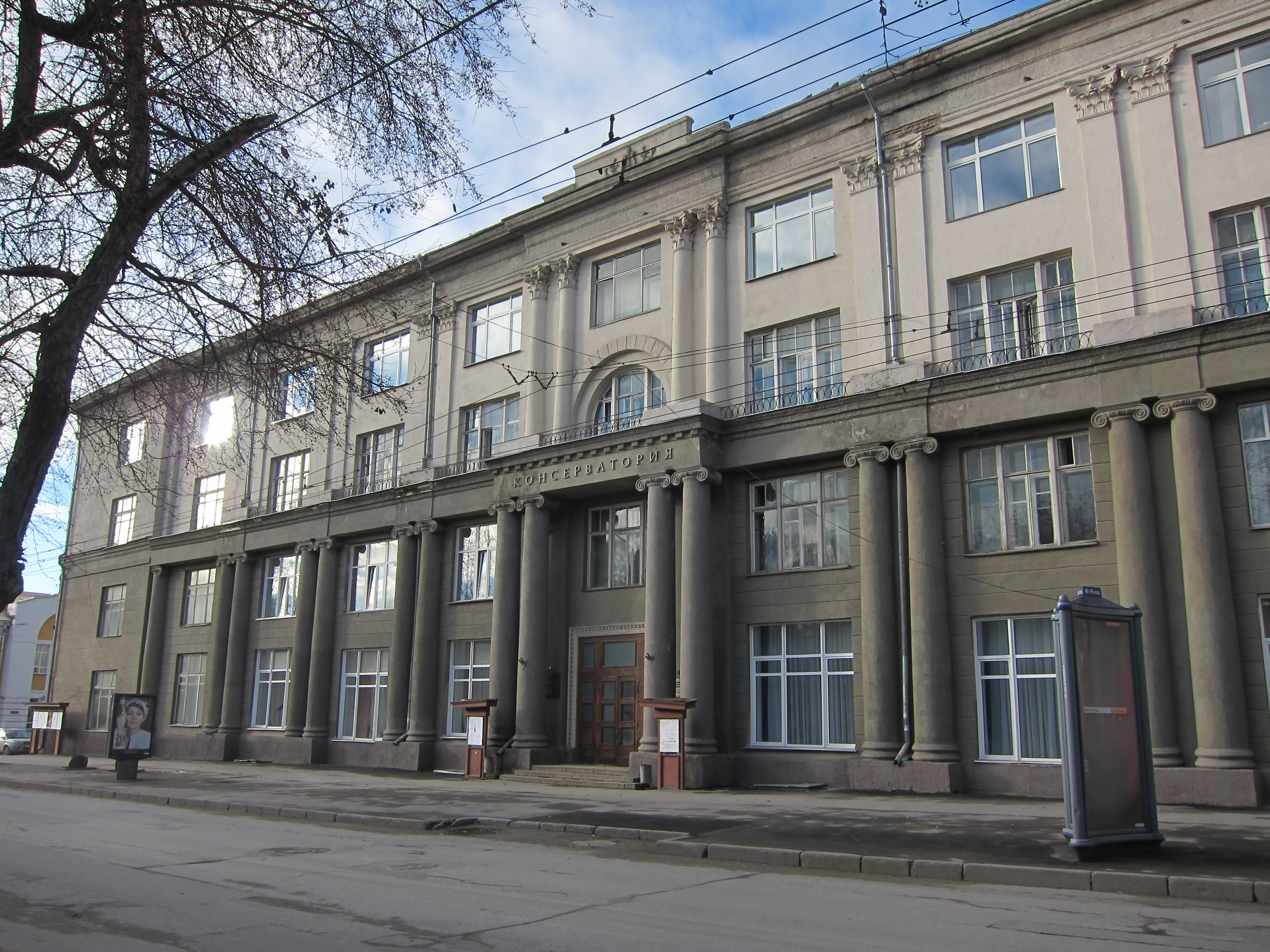
Novosibirsk State Conservatory

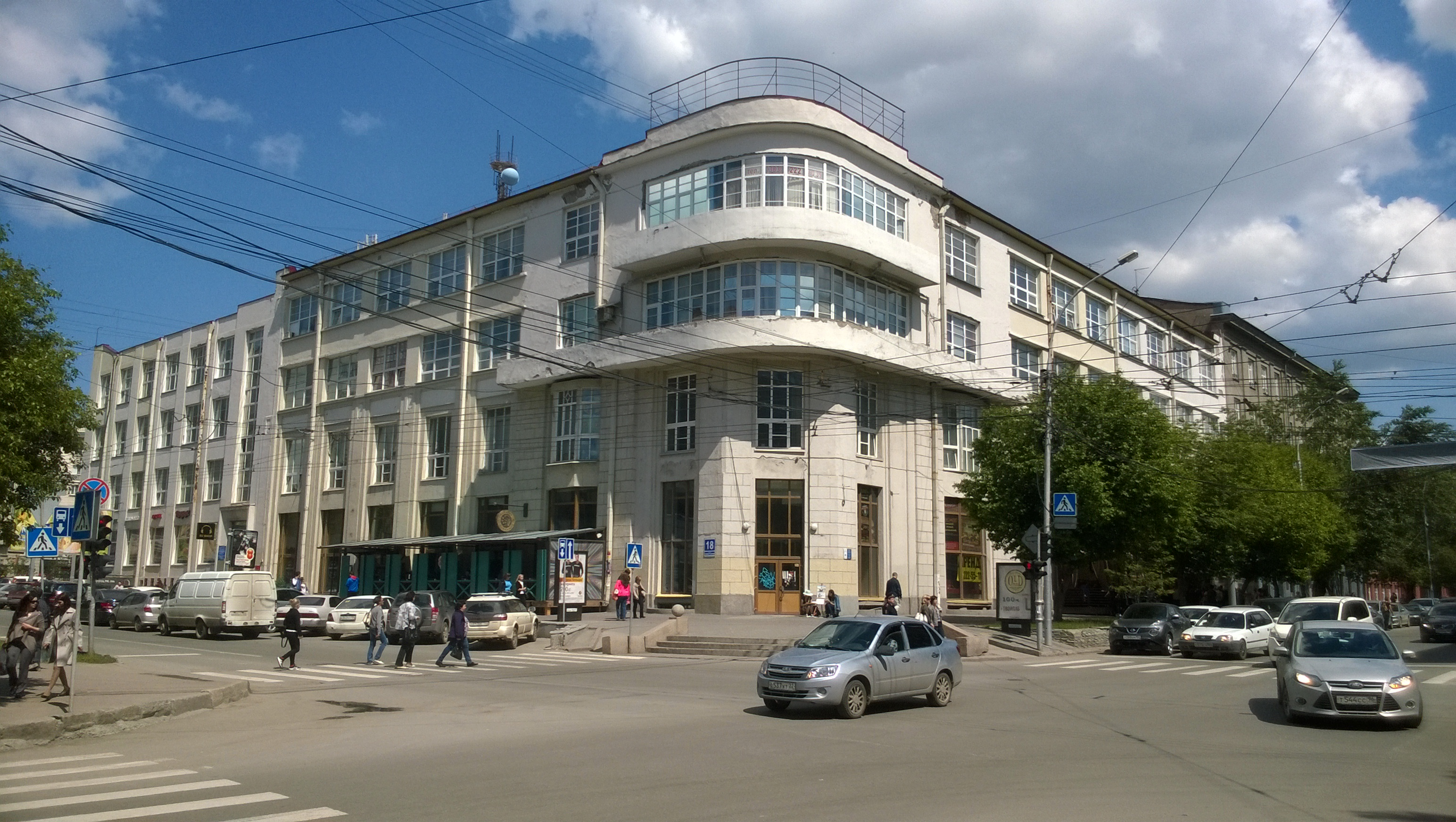
House of Textiles

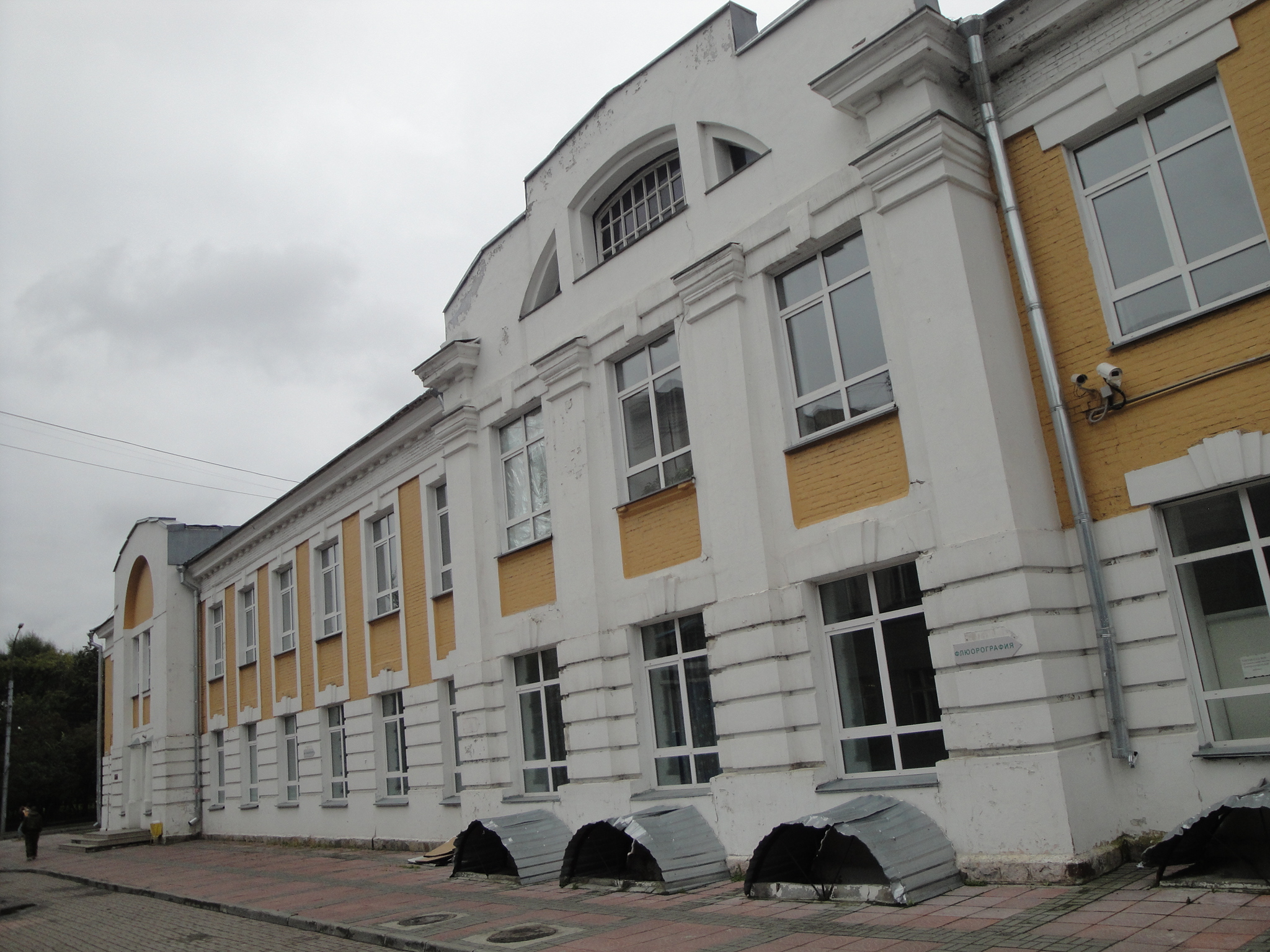
The Hospital

=== Religious buildings ===
Two religious buildings are located near Sovetskaya Street: the Alexander Nevsky Cathedral and the Orthodox cathedral of the Ascension of Christ.

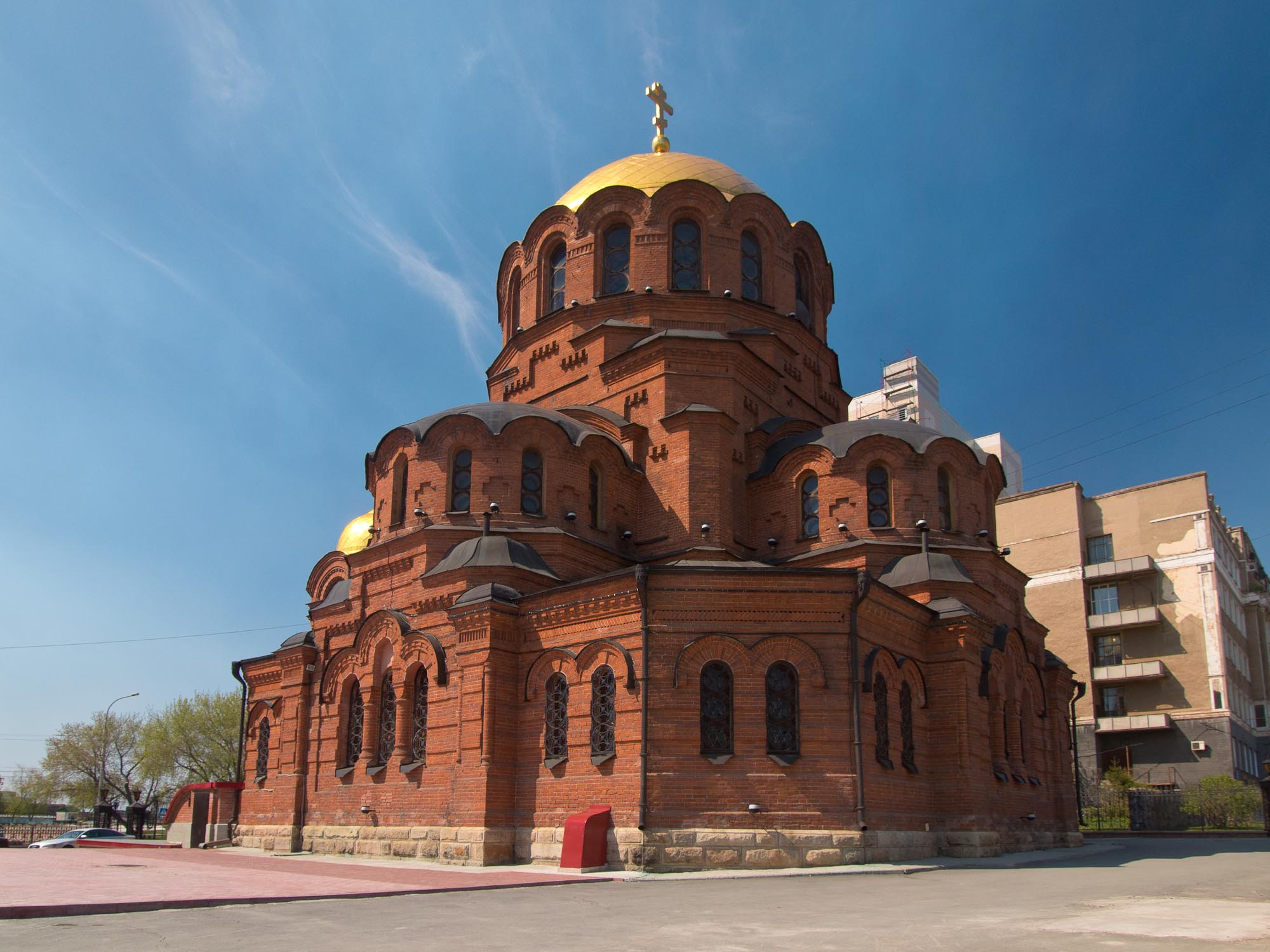
Alexander Nevsky Cathedral

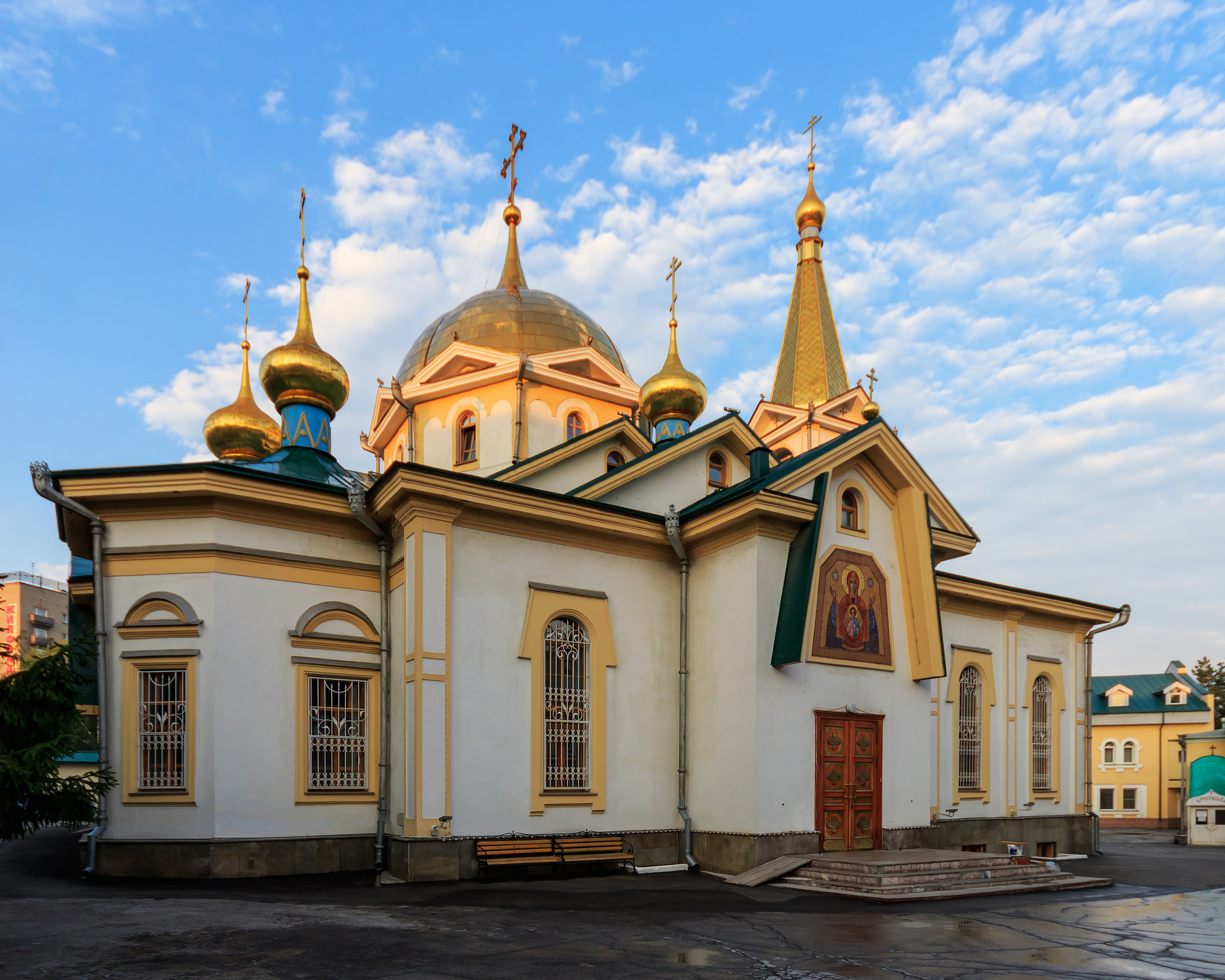
Orthodox cathedral of the Ascension of Christ

== Parks ==
Sovetskaya Street borders two public squares: Pervomaysky Square and Narymsky Square.

== Gallery ==
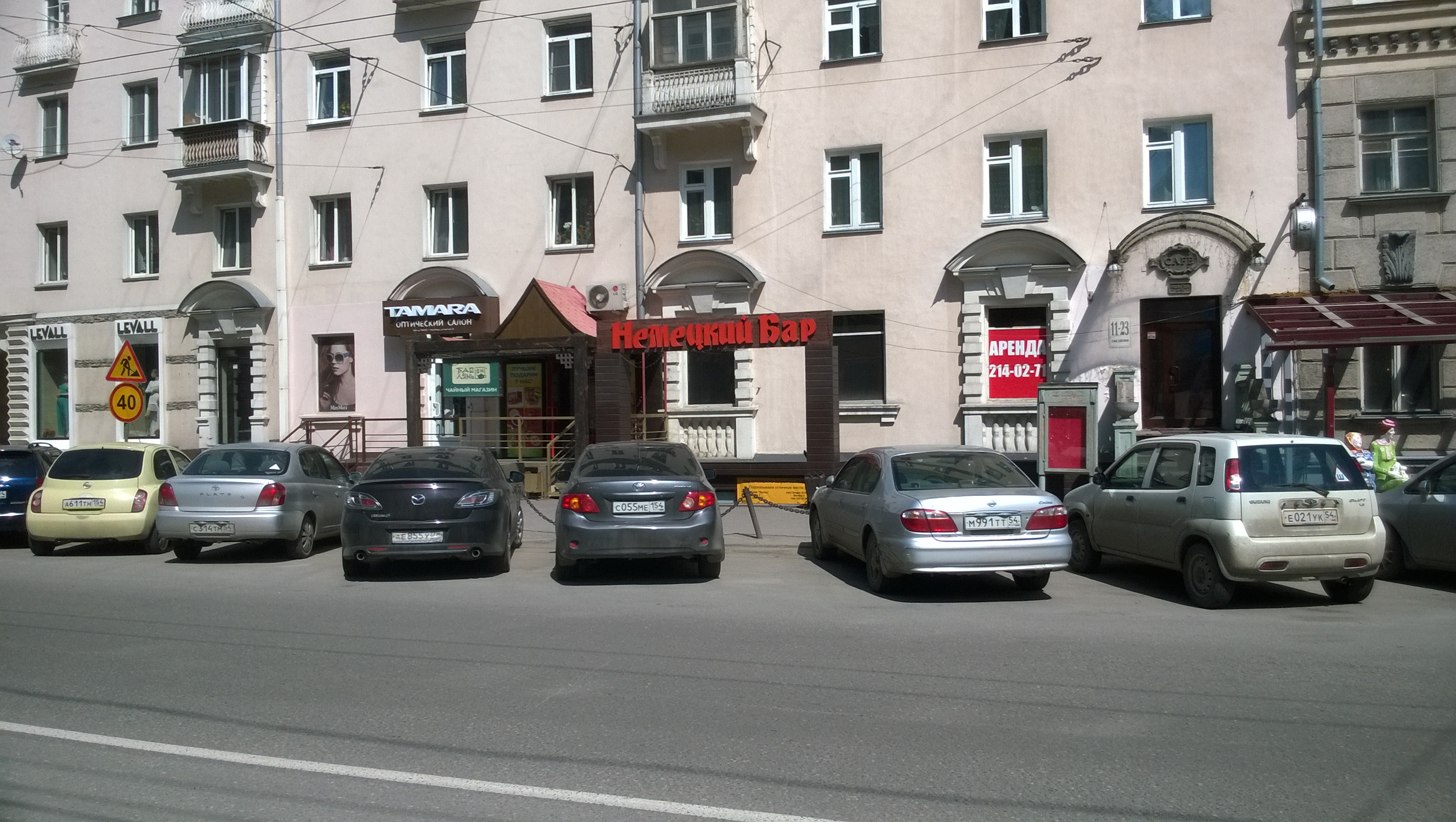

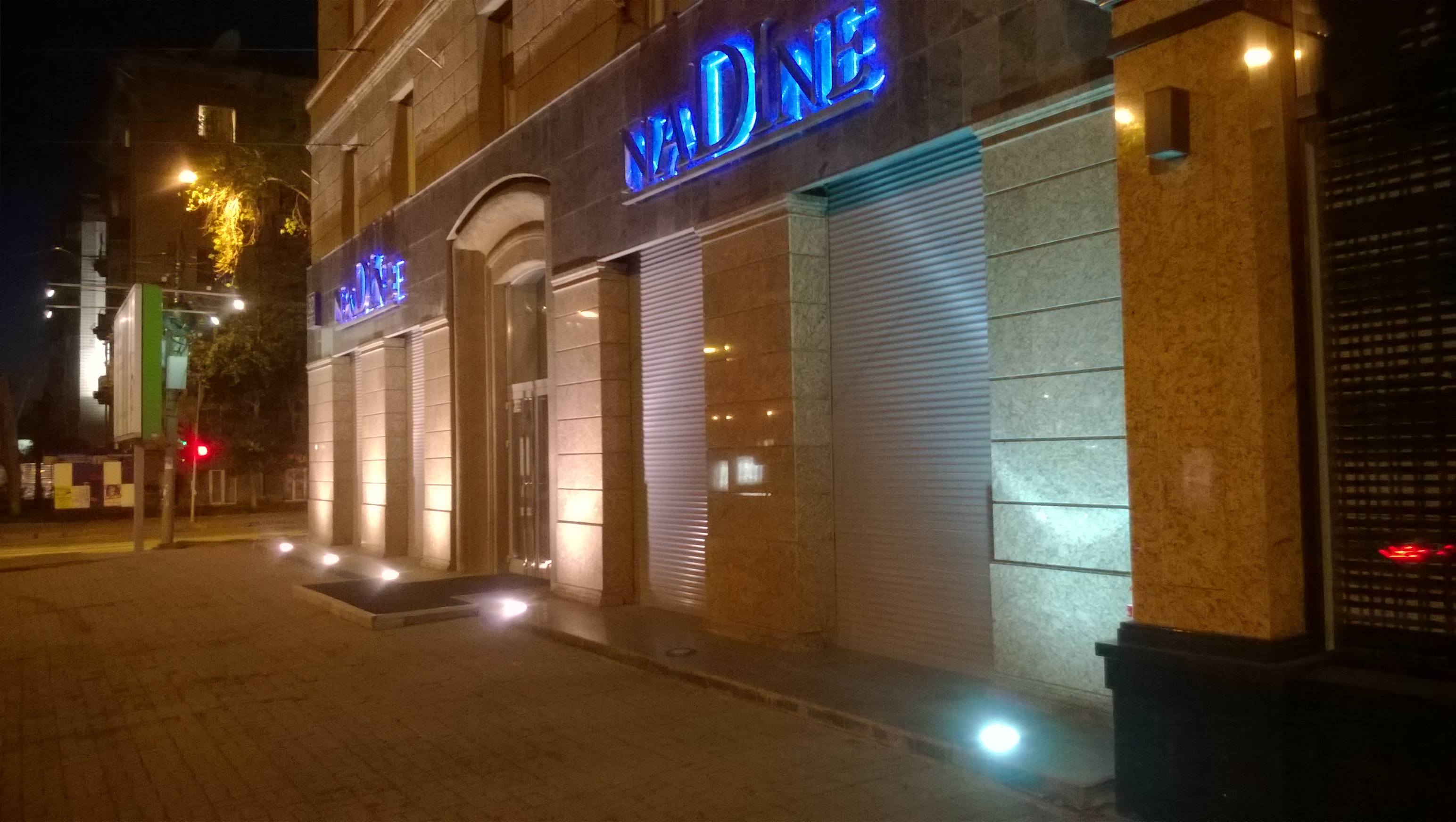

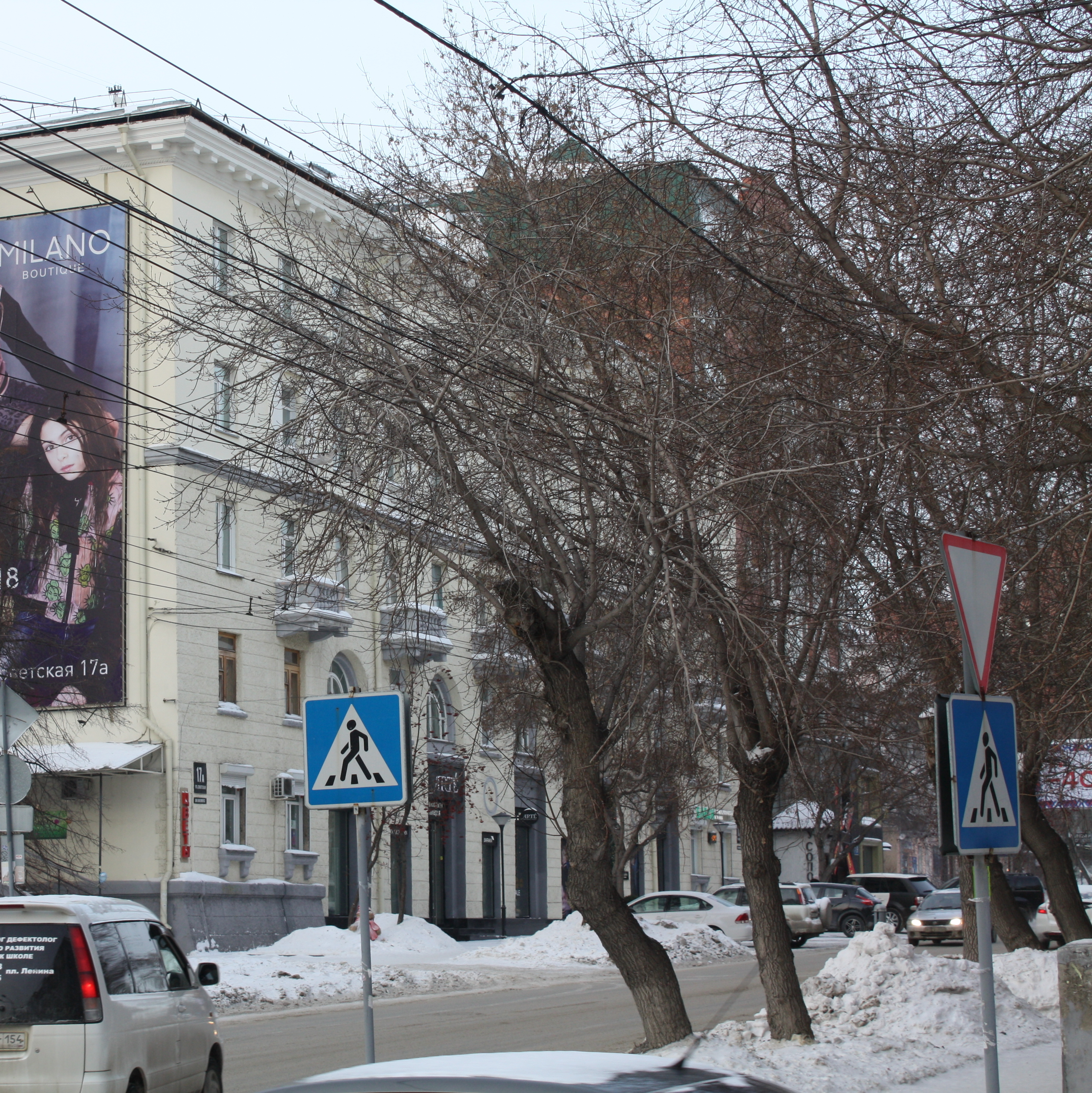

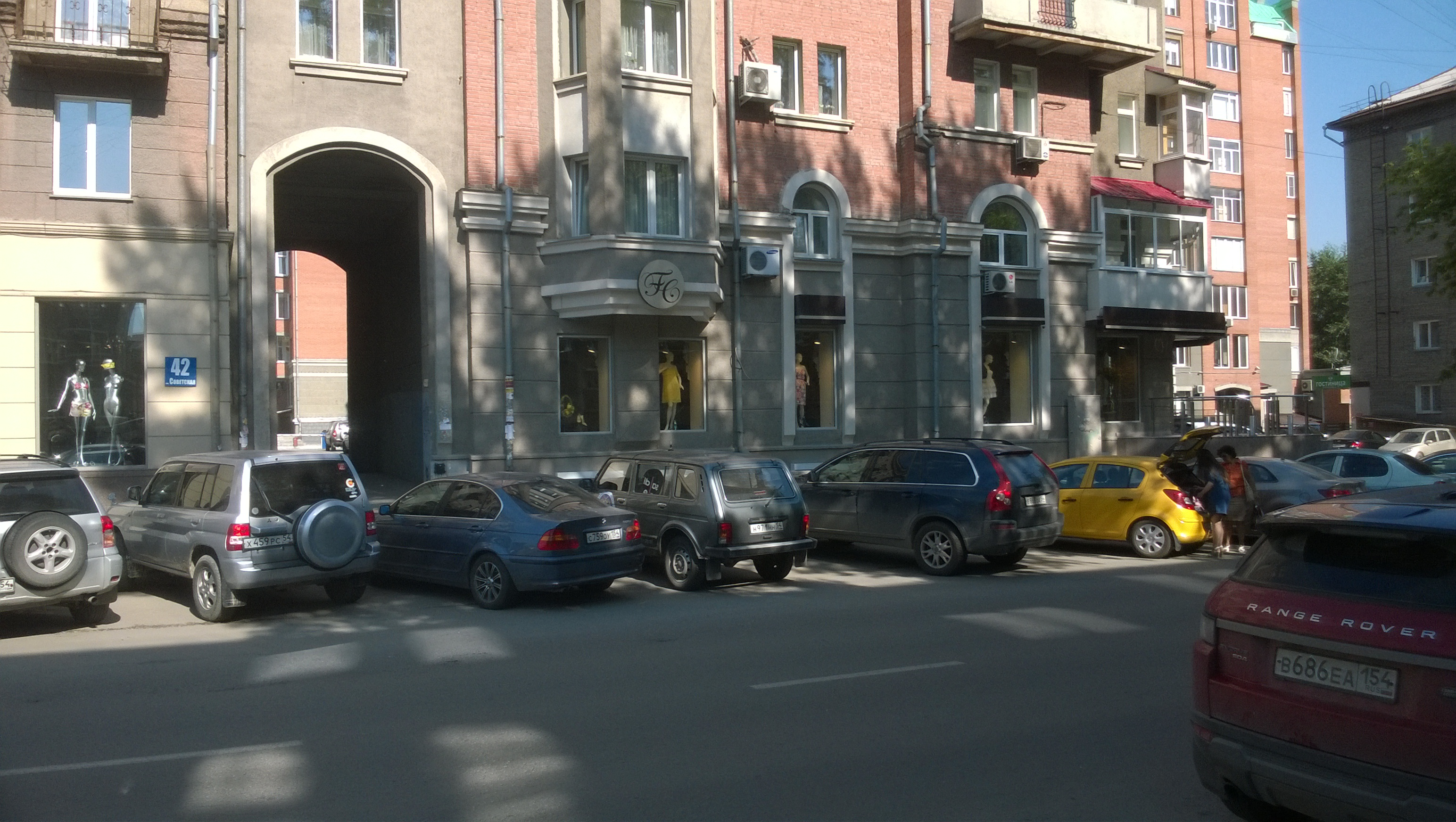

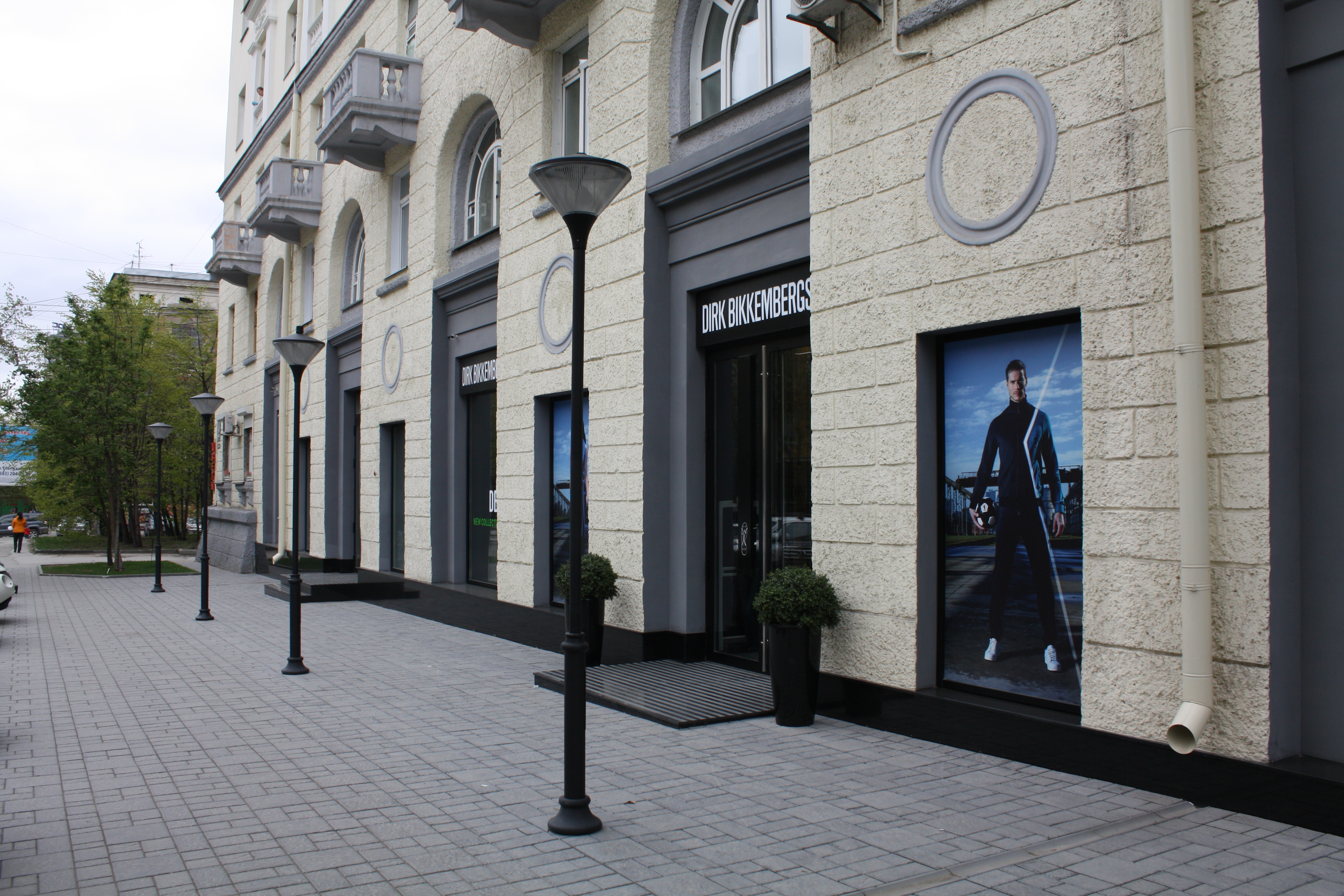

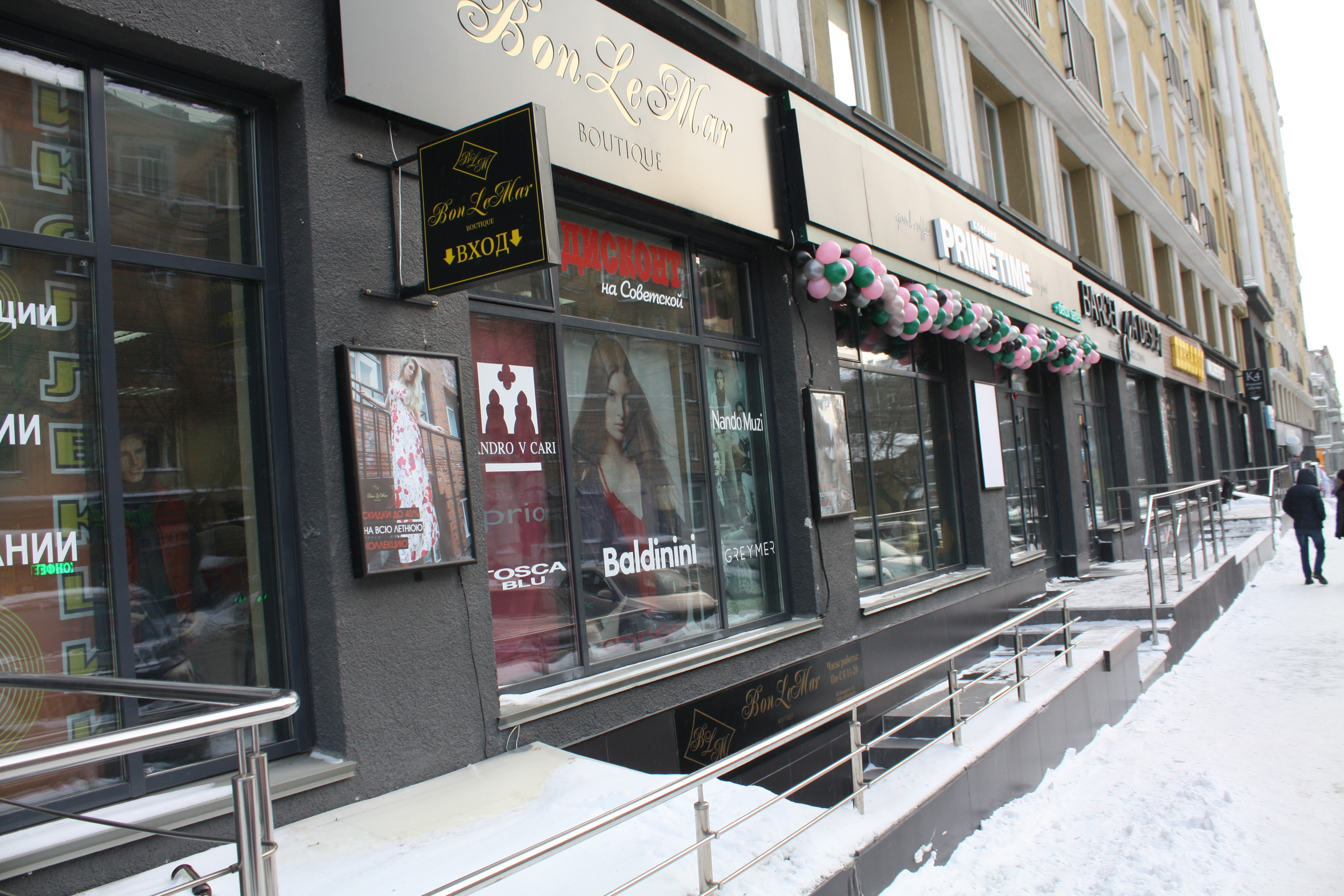

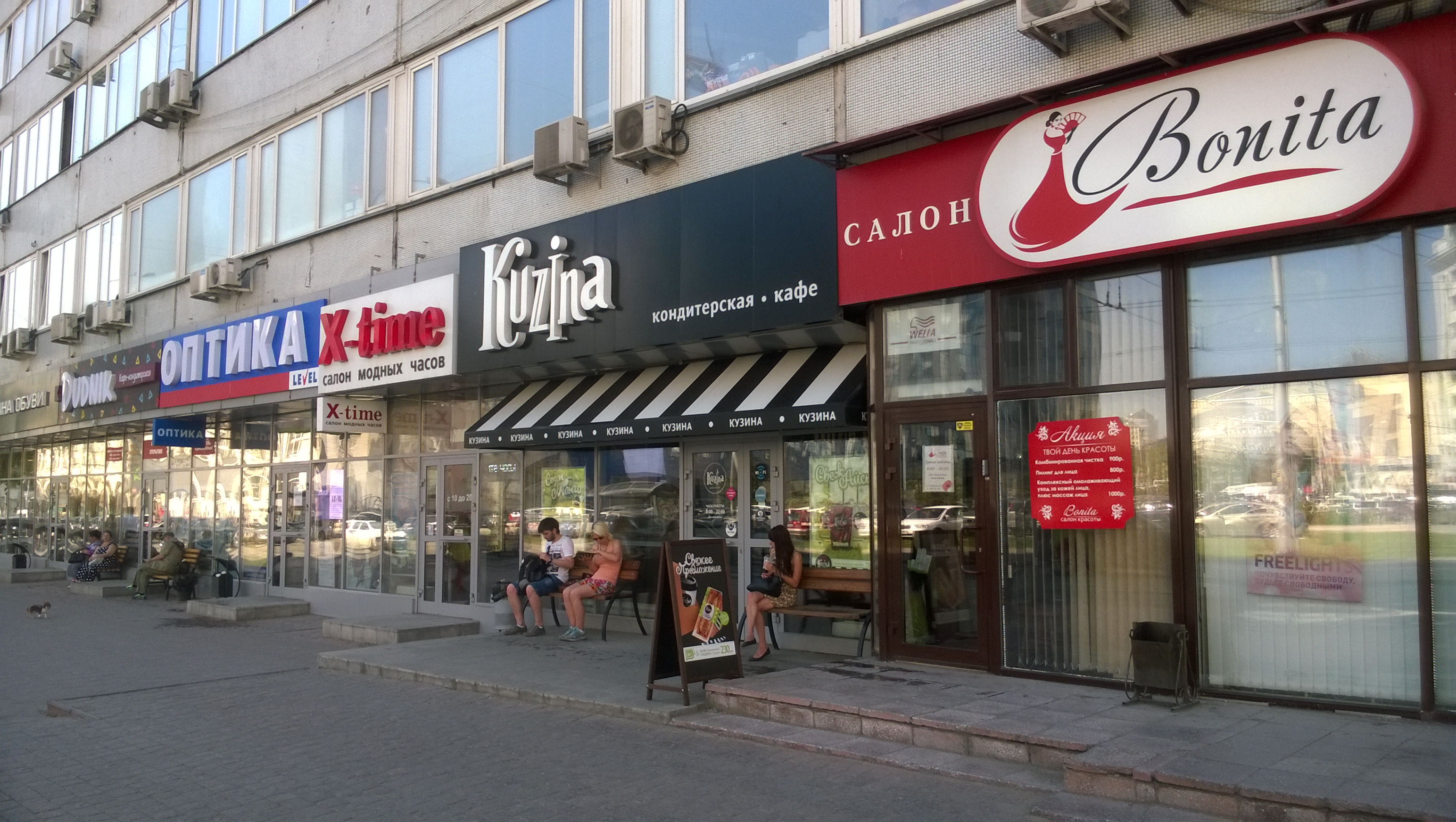
