= Main Post Office, Novosibirsk =

Main Post Office
- Здание главного почтамта
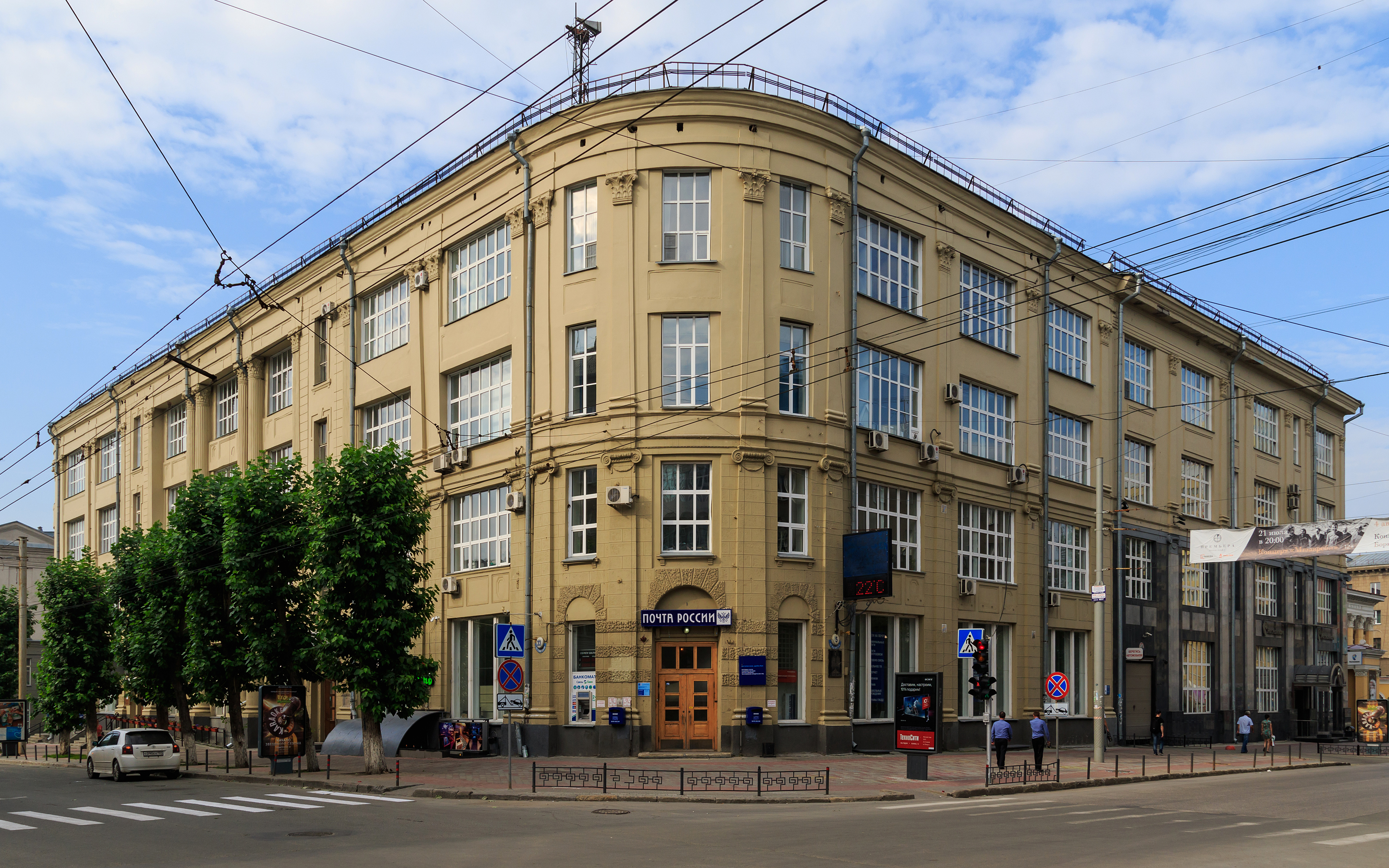
- Interactive map of the Main Post Office area

General information
- Location: Novosibirsk, Russia
- Completed: 1916

Design and construction
- Architect: A. D. Kryachkov

Main Post Office (Russian: Здание главного почтамта) is a building in Zheleznodorozhny City District of Novosibirsk, Russia. It is located on the corner of Lenin and Sovetskaya streets. The building was built in 1916. Architect: Andrey Kryachkov.

== History ==
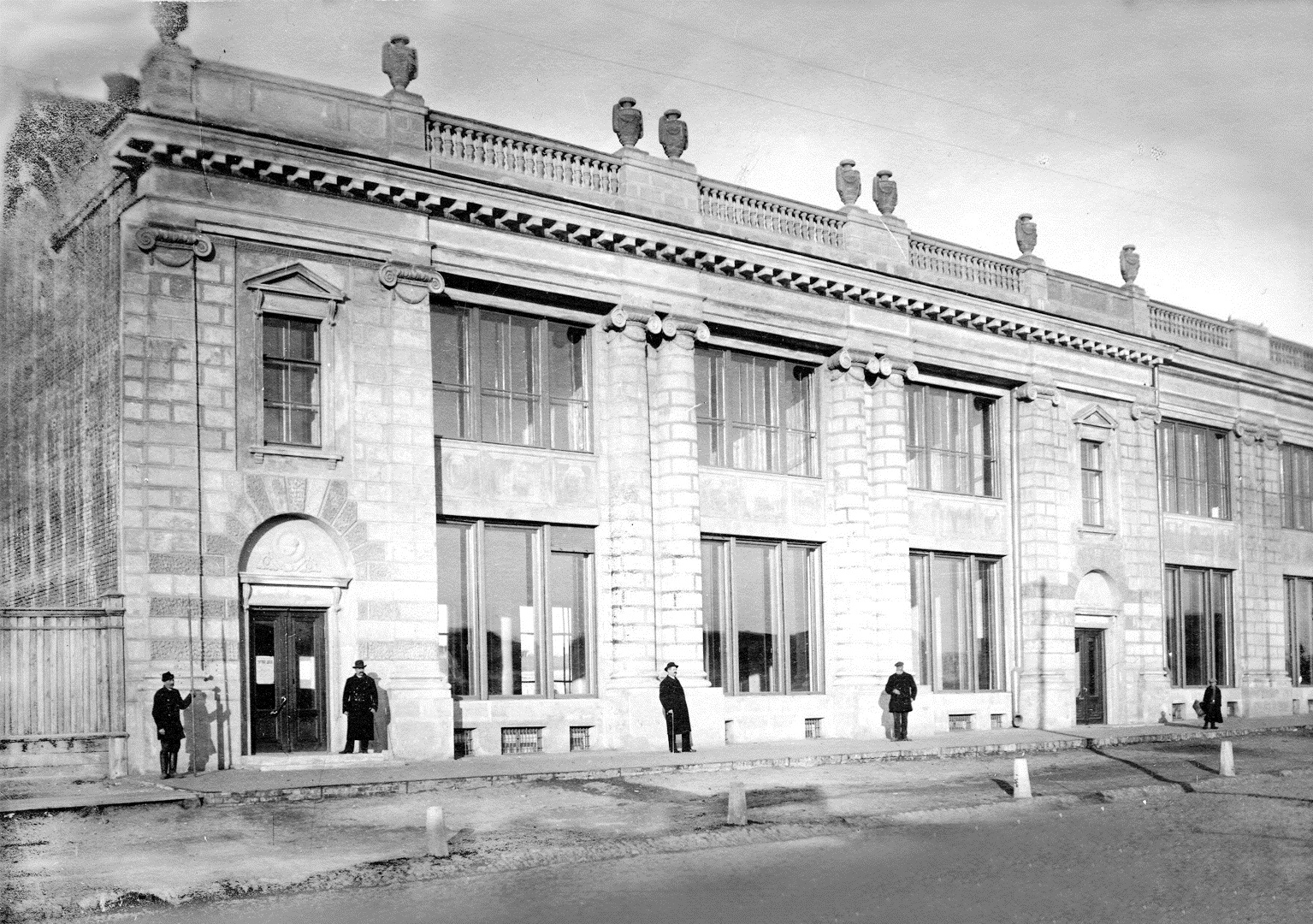
Tsarist period

The building was constructed by Andrey Kryachkov in 1914–1916. Originally it was a two-story building. The house was occupied by a branch of the Bogorodsko-Glukhovskaya Manufactory and belonged to the Moscow textile merchants Morozovs.

In 1922, the Post and Telegraph Office was located in the building.

In 1927, it was reconstructed. The building had been increased to four stories.

== Gallery ==
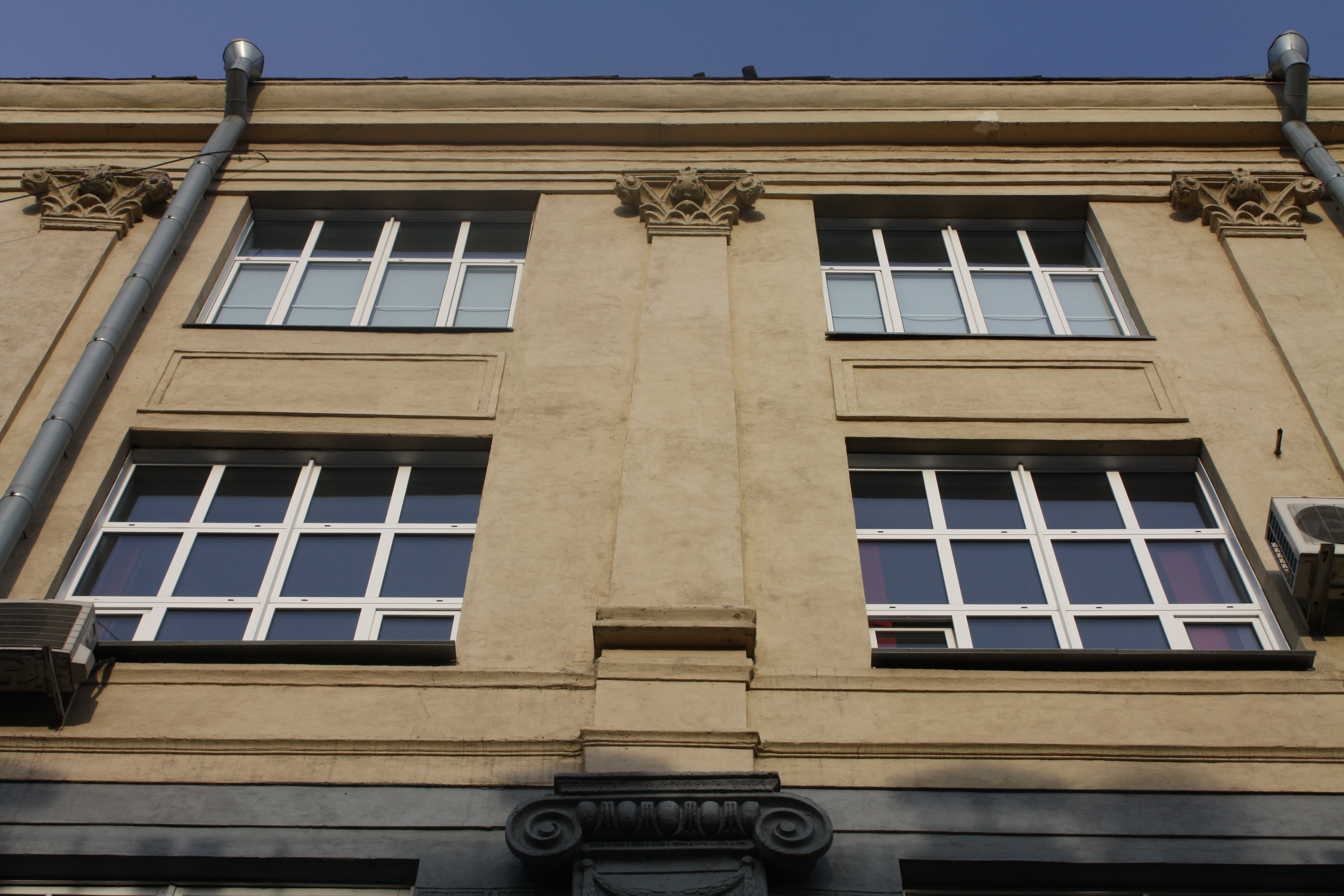

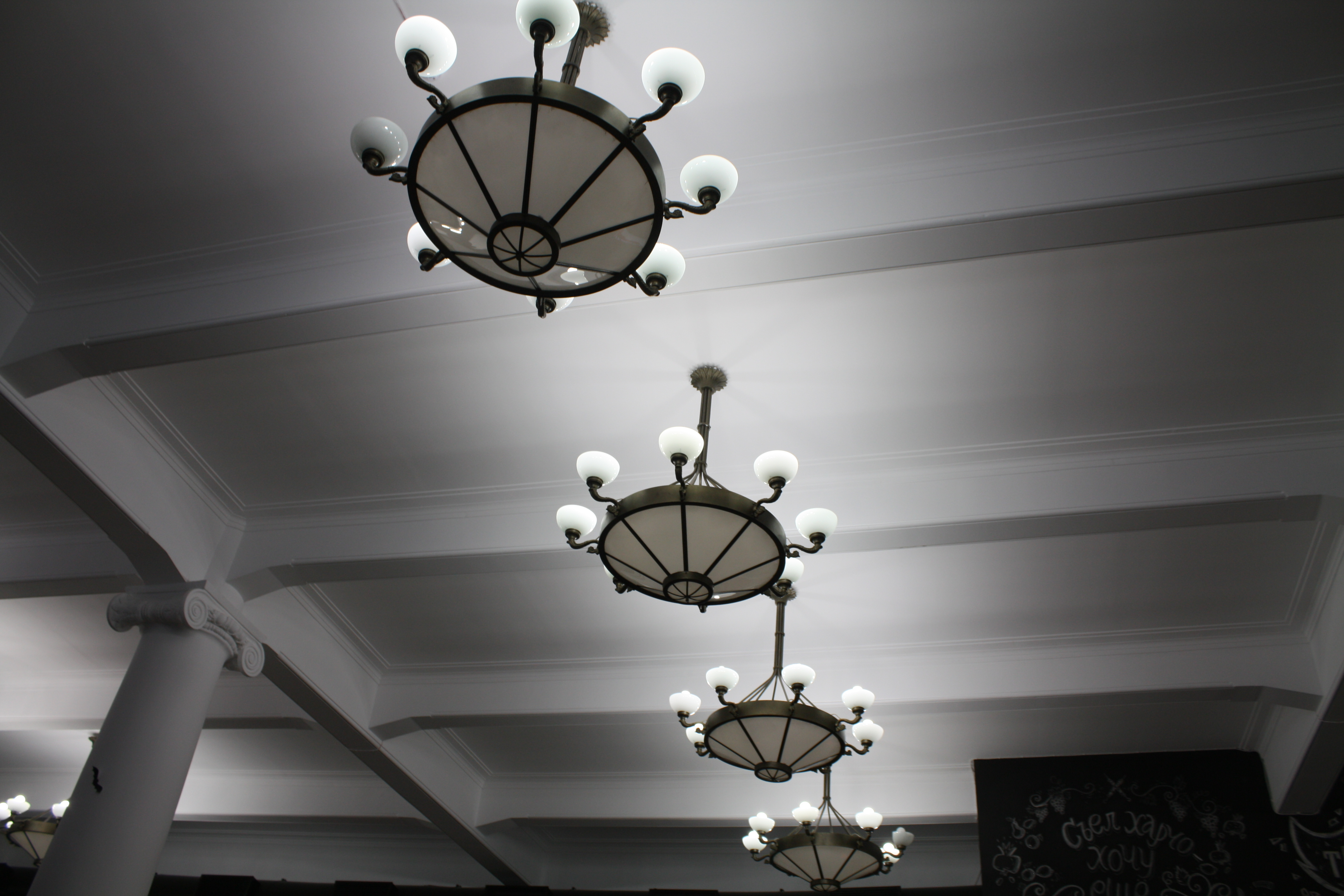

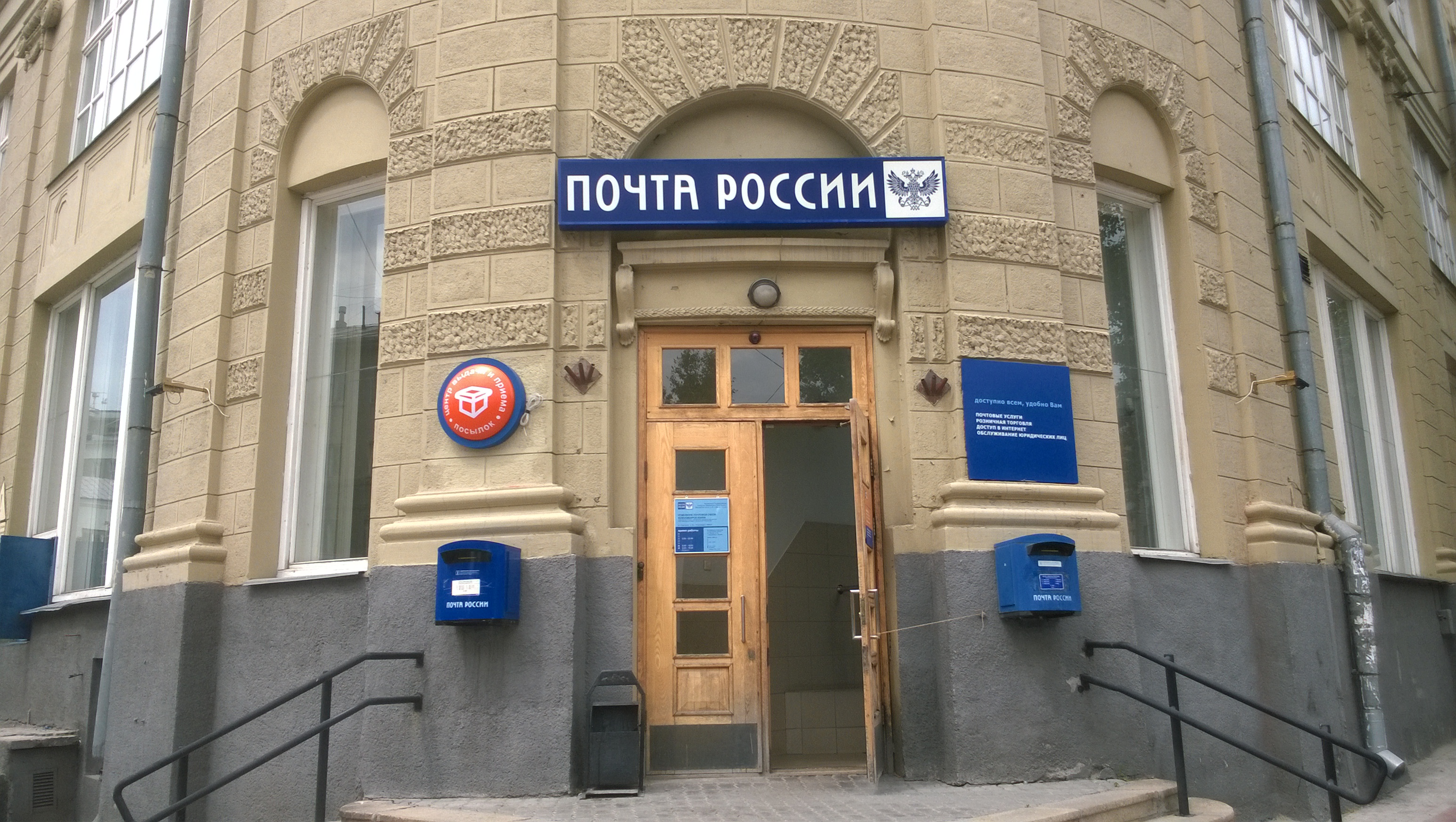

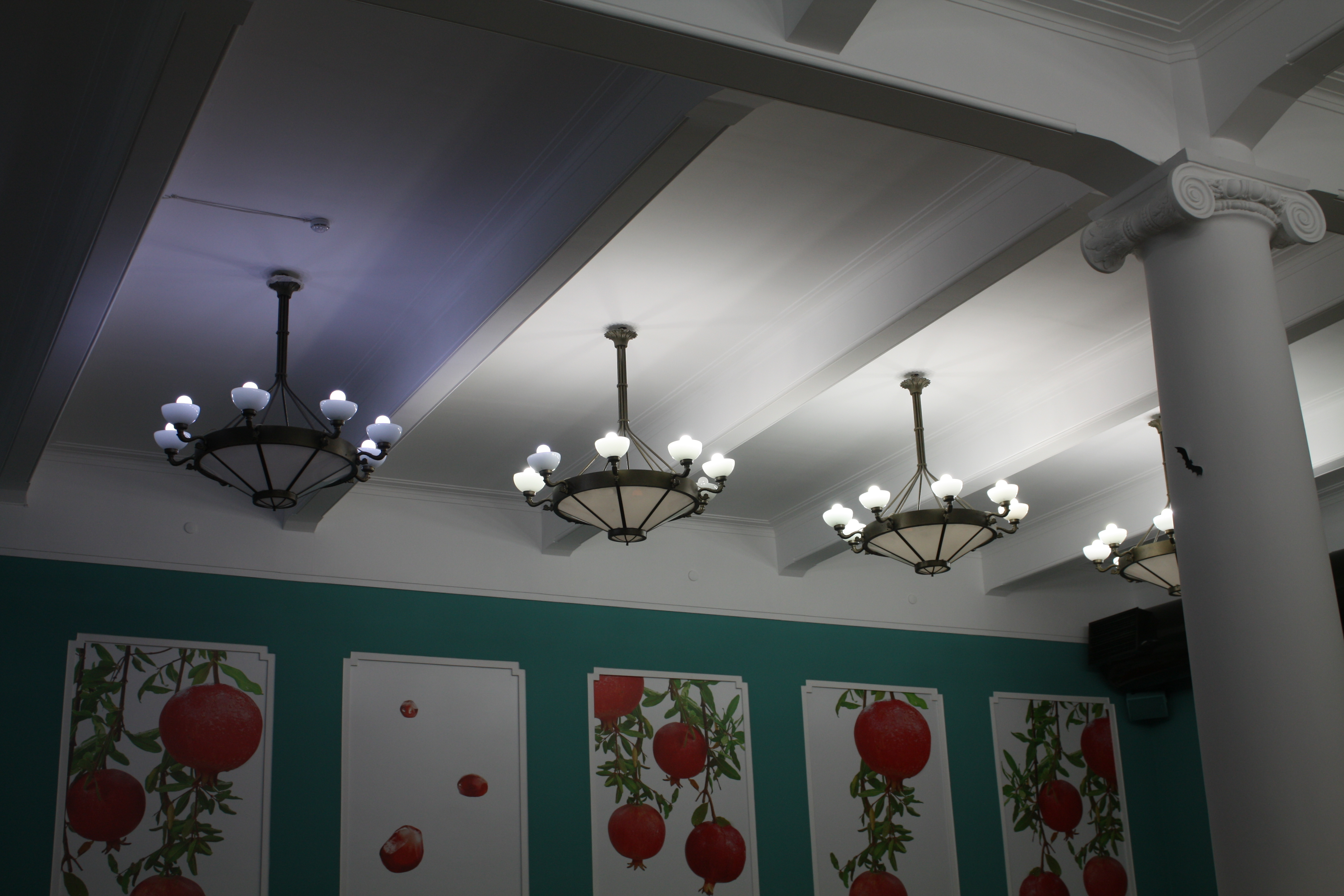
