= Orthodox cathedral of the Ascension of Christ, Novosibirsk =

Russian orthodox church in Novosibirsk, Russia

Coordinates: 55.0422°N 82.9122°E

Orthodox cathedral of the Ascension of Christ Вознесенский Собор
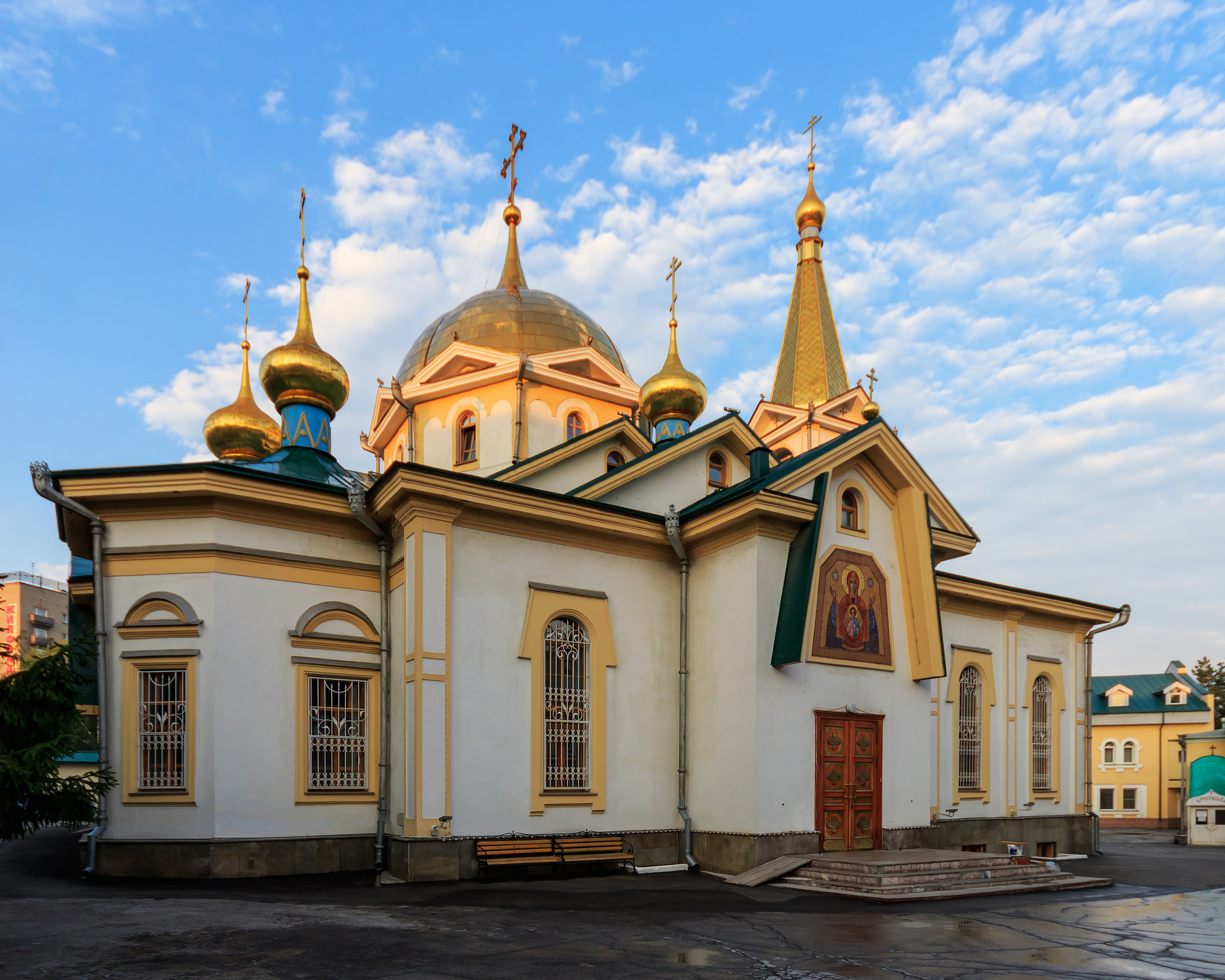

Religion
- Affiliation: Russian Orthodox

Location
- Location: Sovetskaya Street, Novosibirsk
- Interactive map of Orthodox cathedral of the Ascension of Christ; Вознесенский Собор

Architecture
- Completed: 1913

The Orthodox cathedral of the Ascension of Christ (Вознесенский собор) is a Russian Orthodox church in Zheleznodorozhny City District of Novosibirsk, Russia.

== History ==
In 1913, the wooden church was built.
