= House of Textiles, Novosibirsk =

House of Textiles
- Здание Текстильсиндиката (Russian)
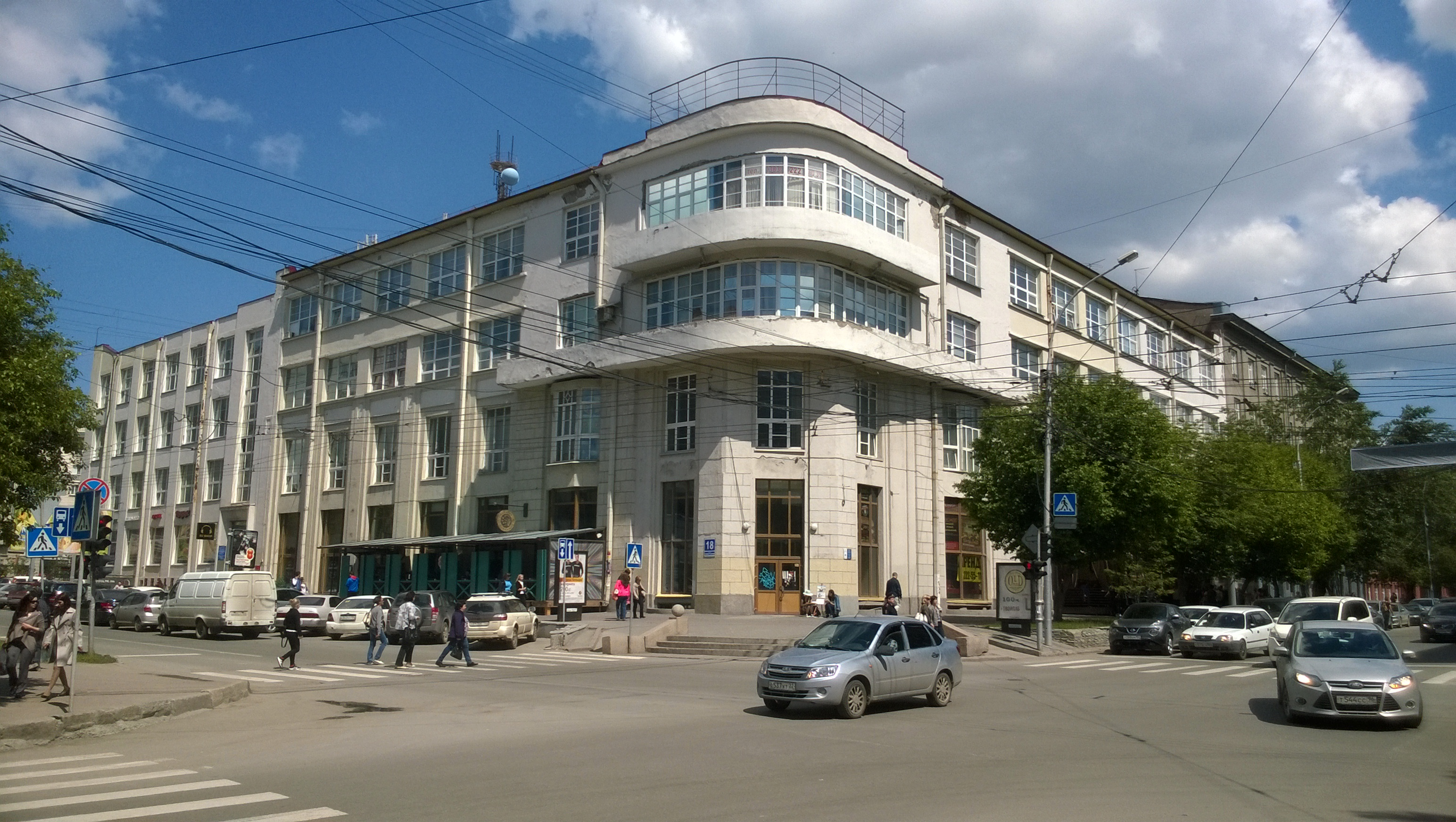
- Interactive map of the House of Textiles area

General information
- Location: Novosibirsk, Russia
- Coordinates: 55°01′49″N 82°55′00″E
- Completed: 1926

Design and construction
- Architects: A. D. Kryachkov; I. D. Lalevich

House of Textiles or Textilsindikat Building (Russian: Дом Текстилей или Здание Текстильсиндиката) is a building in Tsentralny City District of Novosibirsk, Russia. It is located on the corner of Lenin and Sovetskaya streets. The building was built in 1926. Architect: Andrey Kryachkov.

== History ==
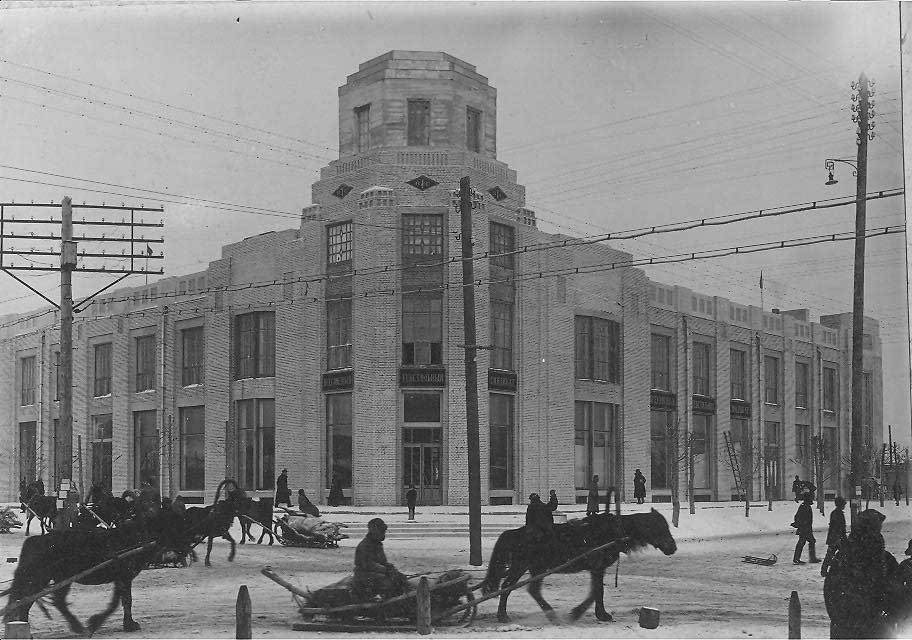
The building in 1929

The house was constructed by Andrey Kryachkov in 1925–1926. Originally it was a two-story building, the corner of the house was crowned with octahedral tower.

The first floor was occupied by fabric shops; offices and employee rooms were located on the second floor.

In 1930, the building was reconstructed by I. D. Lalevich. It had been increased to four stories.

From 1941 to 1955, Institute of Military Transport Engineers was located in the building.

Since the 1960s, the house was occupied by Zolotoy Koloss Bread Shop. The shop had its own bakery.

Since 2014, the ground floor of the building is occupied by restaurants and coffee shops.

== Gallery ==
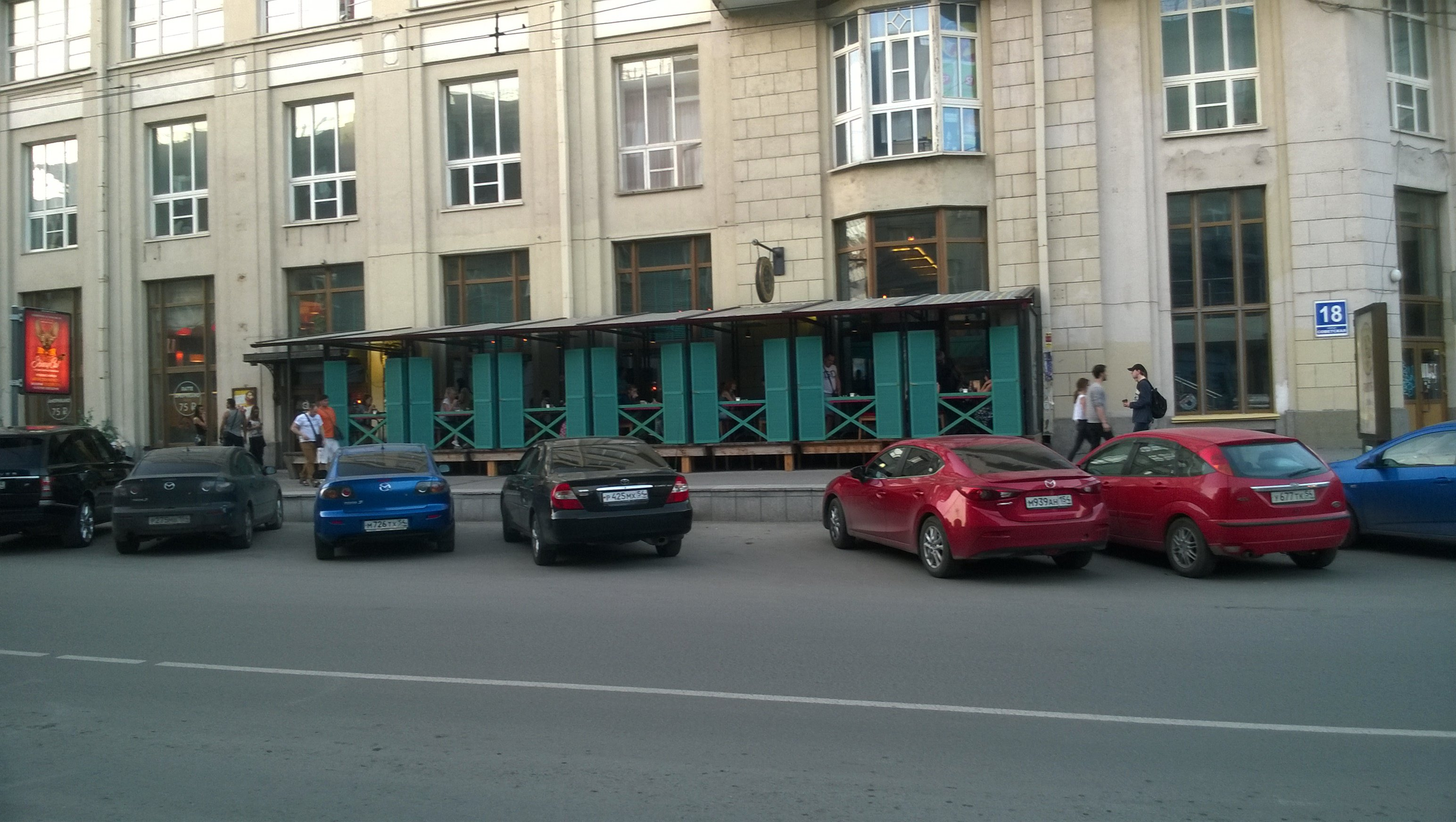

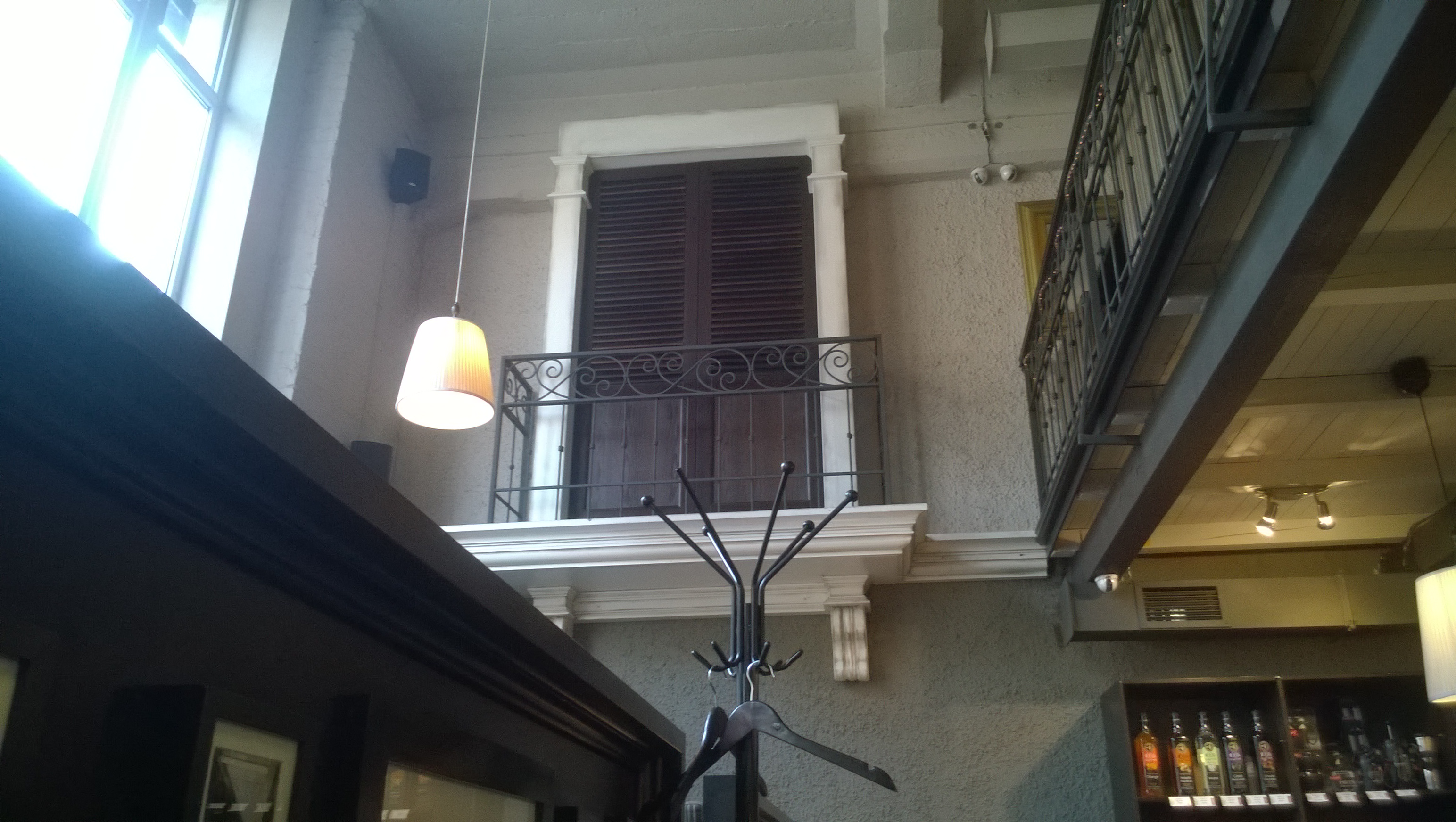

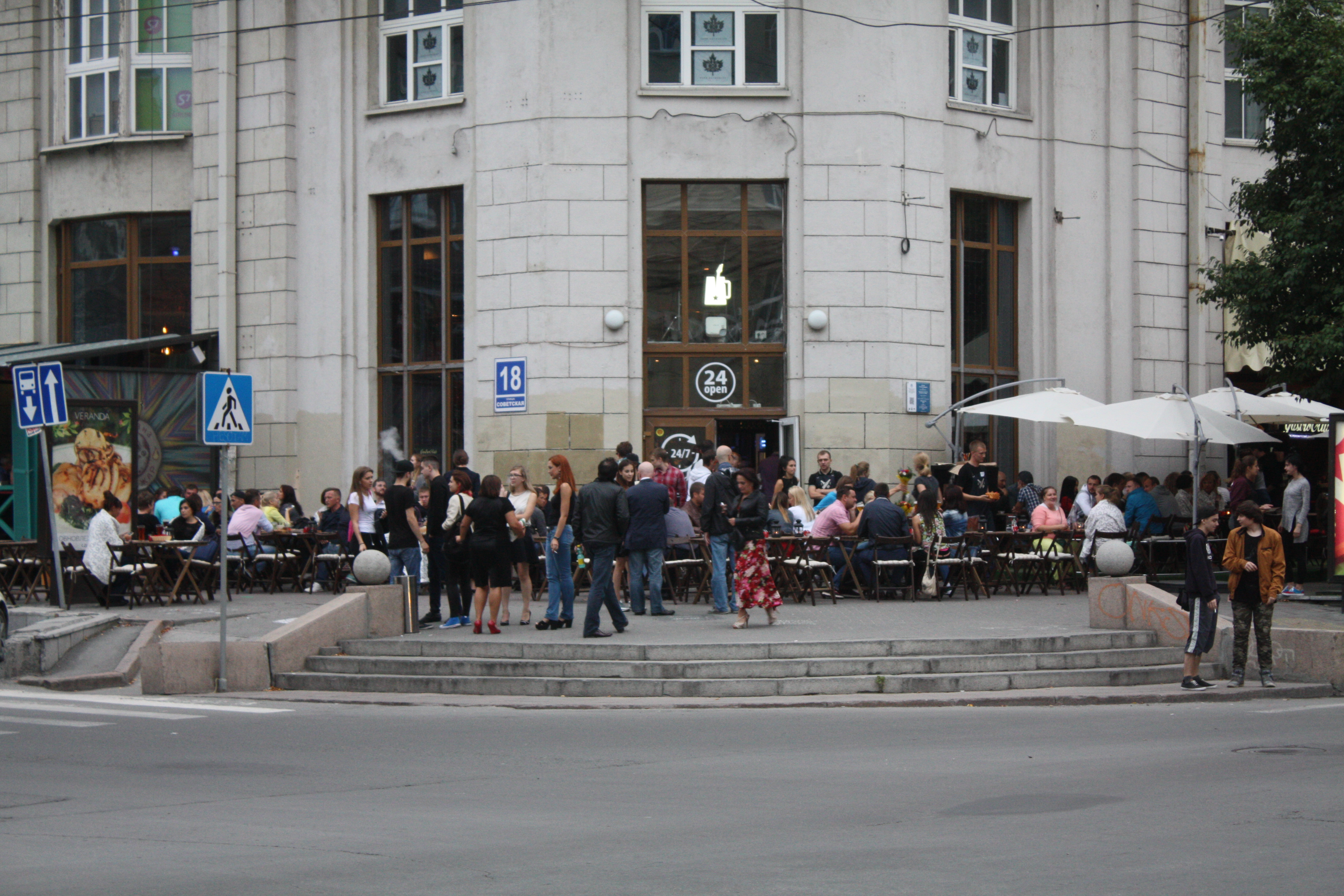

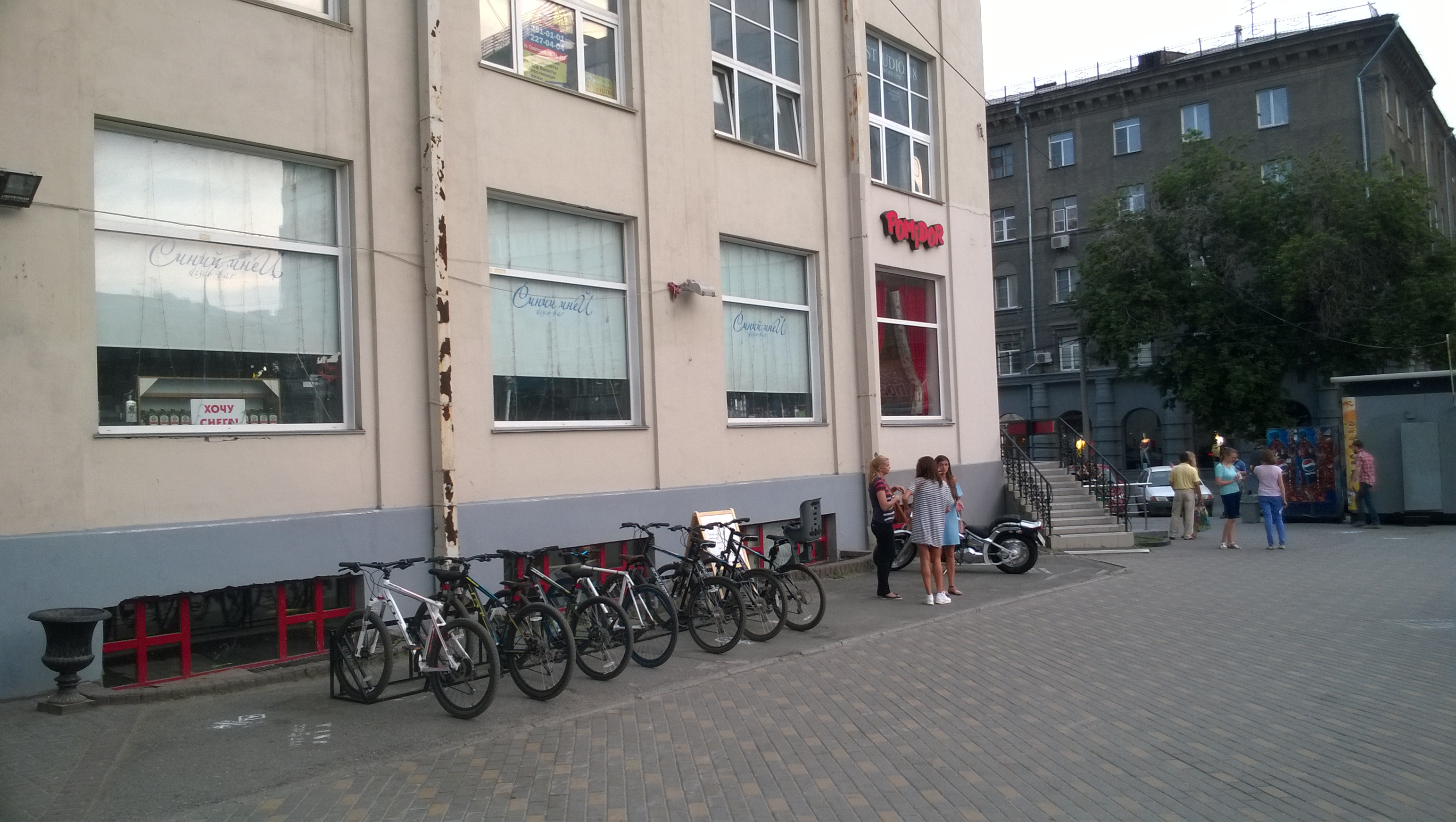

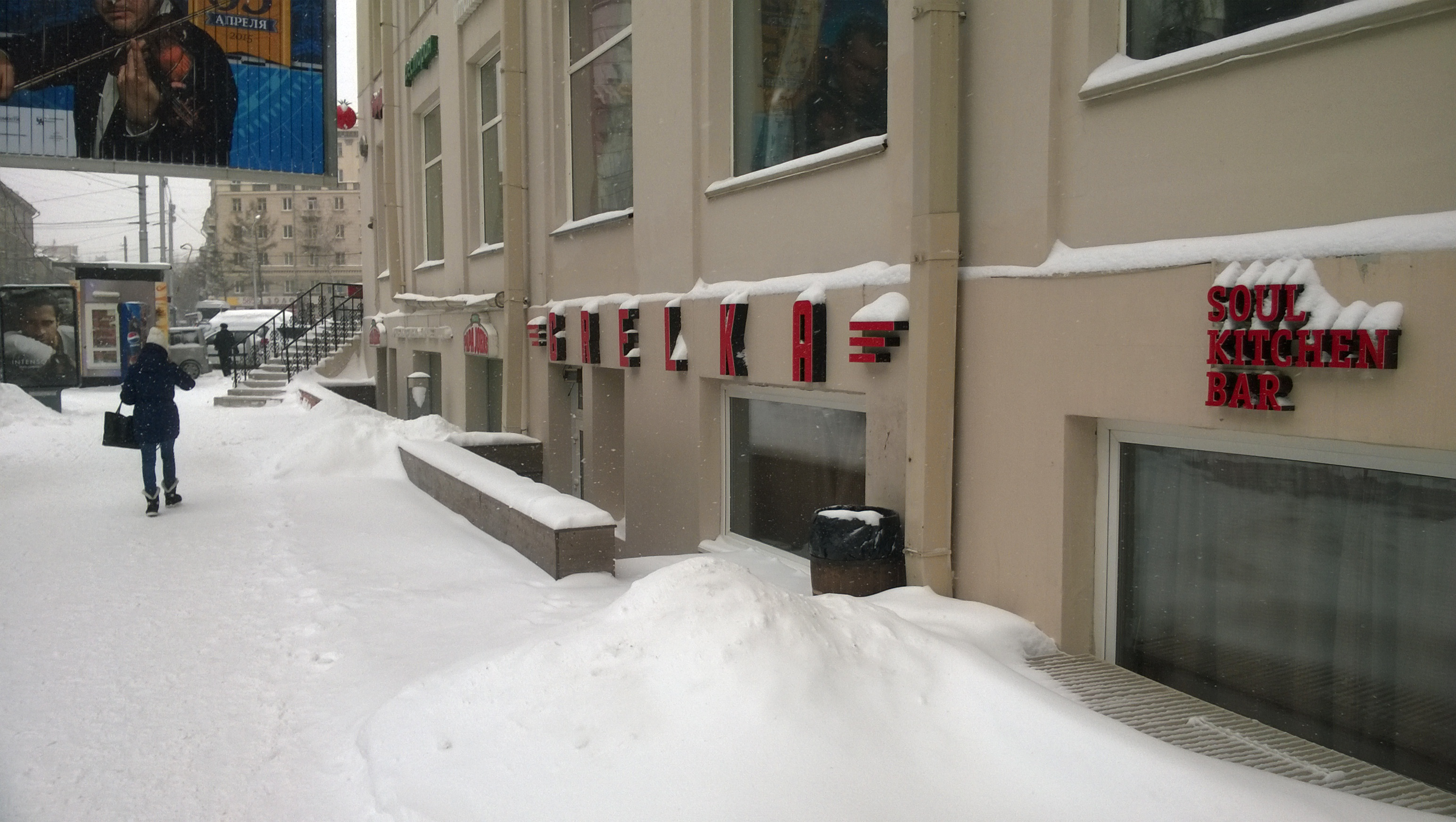
