= Prombank Dormitory =

Building in Tsentralny, Novosibirsk, Russia

- Общежитие Промбанка
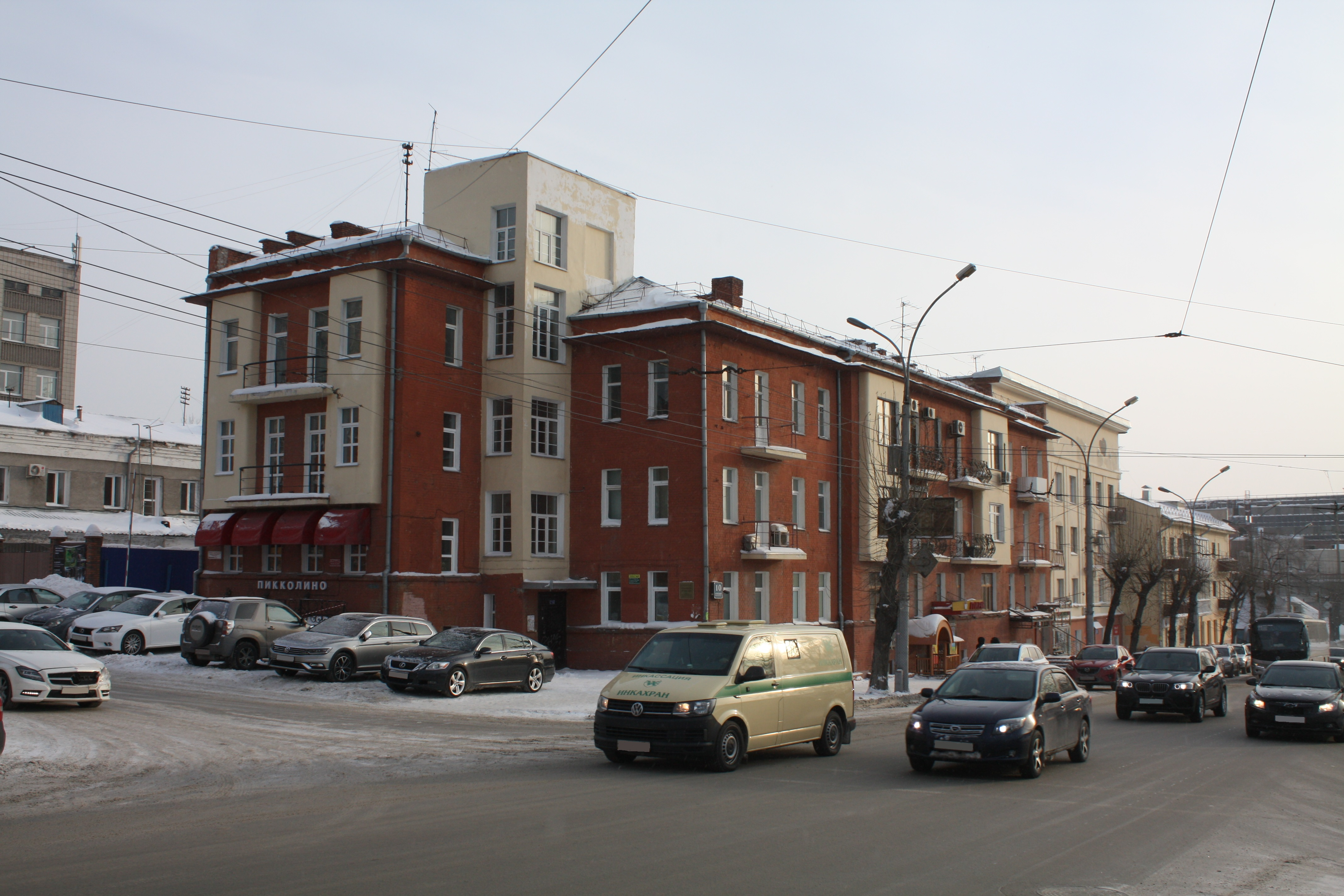
- Interactive map of the Prombank Dormitory area

General information
- Location: Novosibirsk, Russia
- Completed: 1927

Design and construction
- Architect: I. A. Burlakov

Prombank Dormitory (Russian: Общежитие Промбанка) is a constructivist building in Tsentralny City District of Novosibirsk, Russia, built in 1927 by architect I. A. Burlakov for workers of the Industrial Bank or Prombank. It is located on the corner of Krasny Avenue and Kainskaya Street.

== See also ==
- Gosbank Building
- Kuzbassugol Building Complex
