= Krasny Avenue =

Street in Novosibirsk, Russia

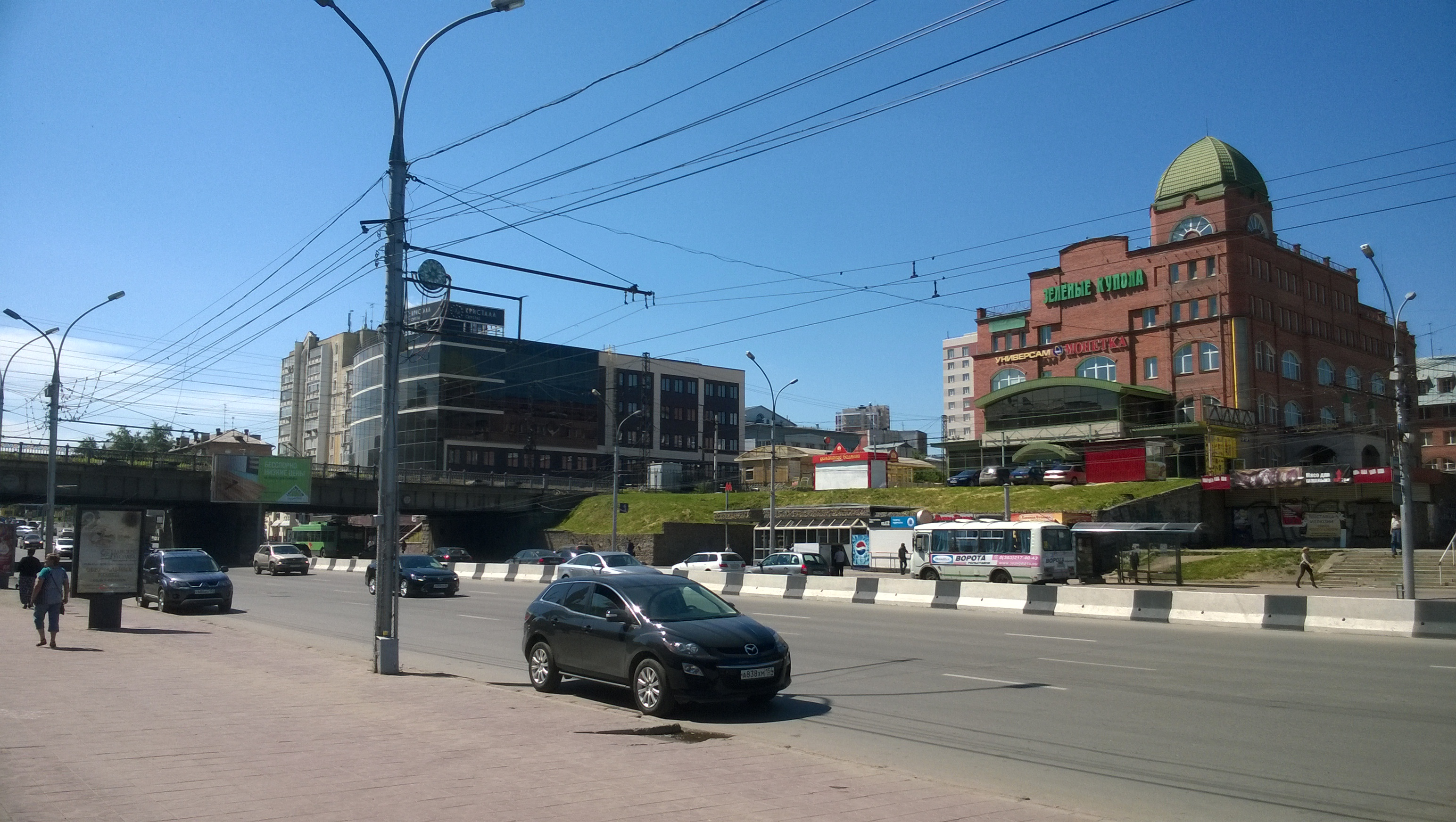
- Interactive map of Krasny Avenue
- Native name: Krasny Avenue (Russian)
- Length: 7 km (4.3 mi)
- Location: Novosibirsk; Russia

Krasny Prospekt (Russian: Красный проспект) or Krasny Avenue (lit. Red Avenue) is the central street and major thoroughfare in the city of Novosibirsk, Russia. Until 1920, it was known as the Nikolaevsky Prospekt (Russian: Никола́евский проспект) or Nicholas' Avenue. Its length is about 7 km. It runs across the central part of the city starting from the right bank of the Ob River and terminates in the vicinity of Severny Airport. The main square of Novosibirsk – Lenin Square – is a part of Krasny prospekt, as well as Sverdlov and Kalinin squares.

== Buildings and structures ==
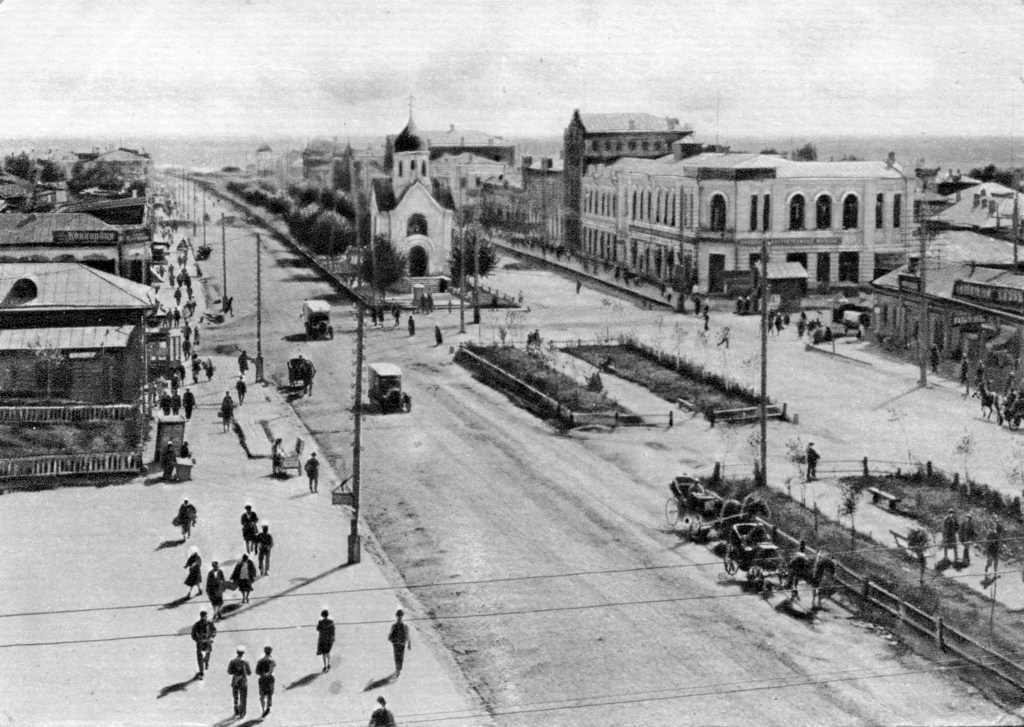
The Avenue between 1925 and 1929. The chapel will be demolished in 1930.

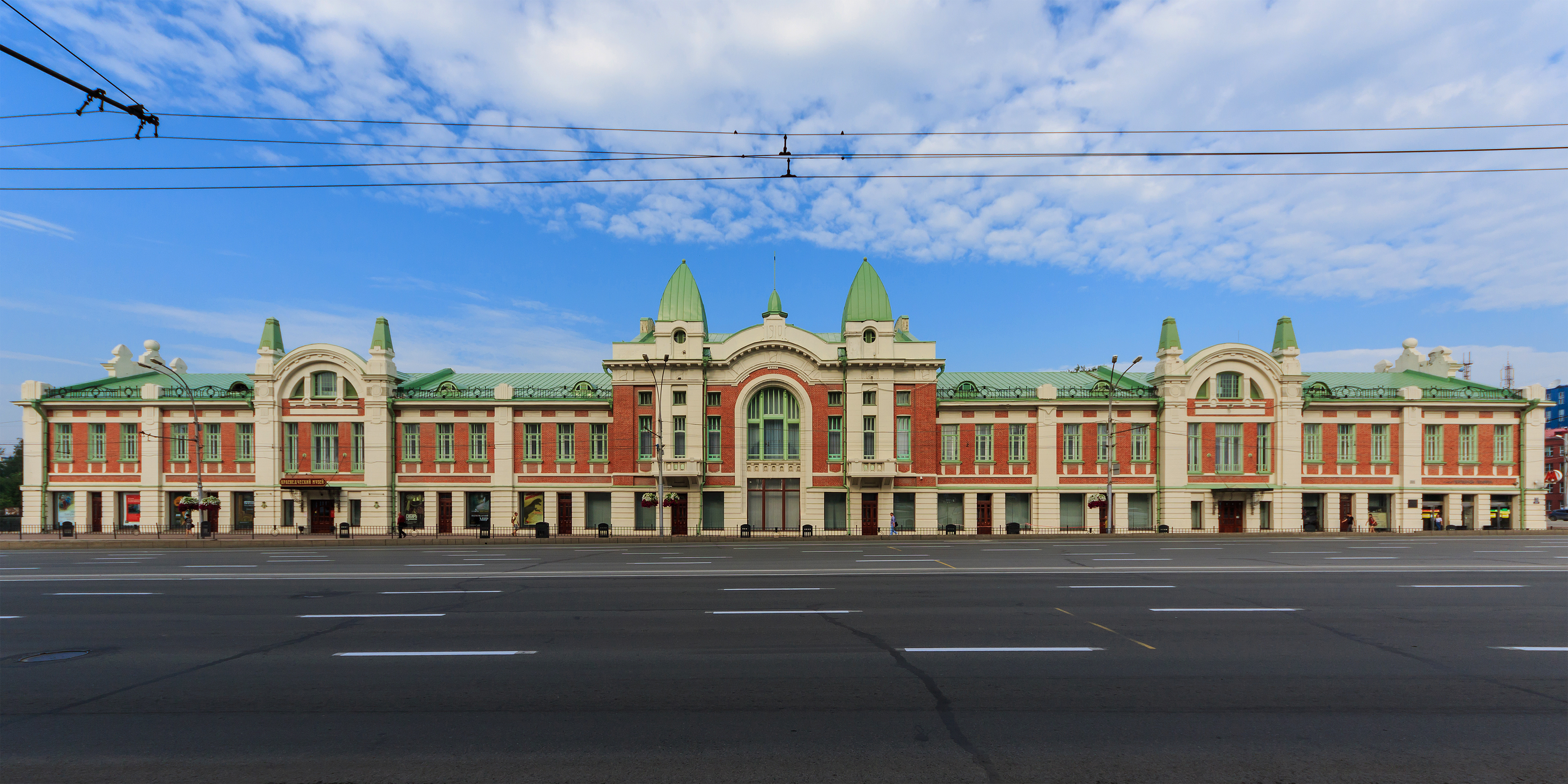
City Trade House

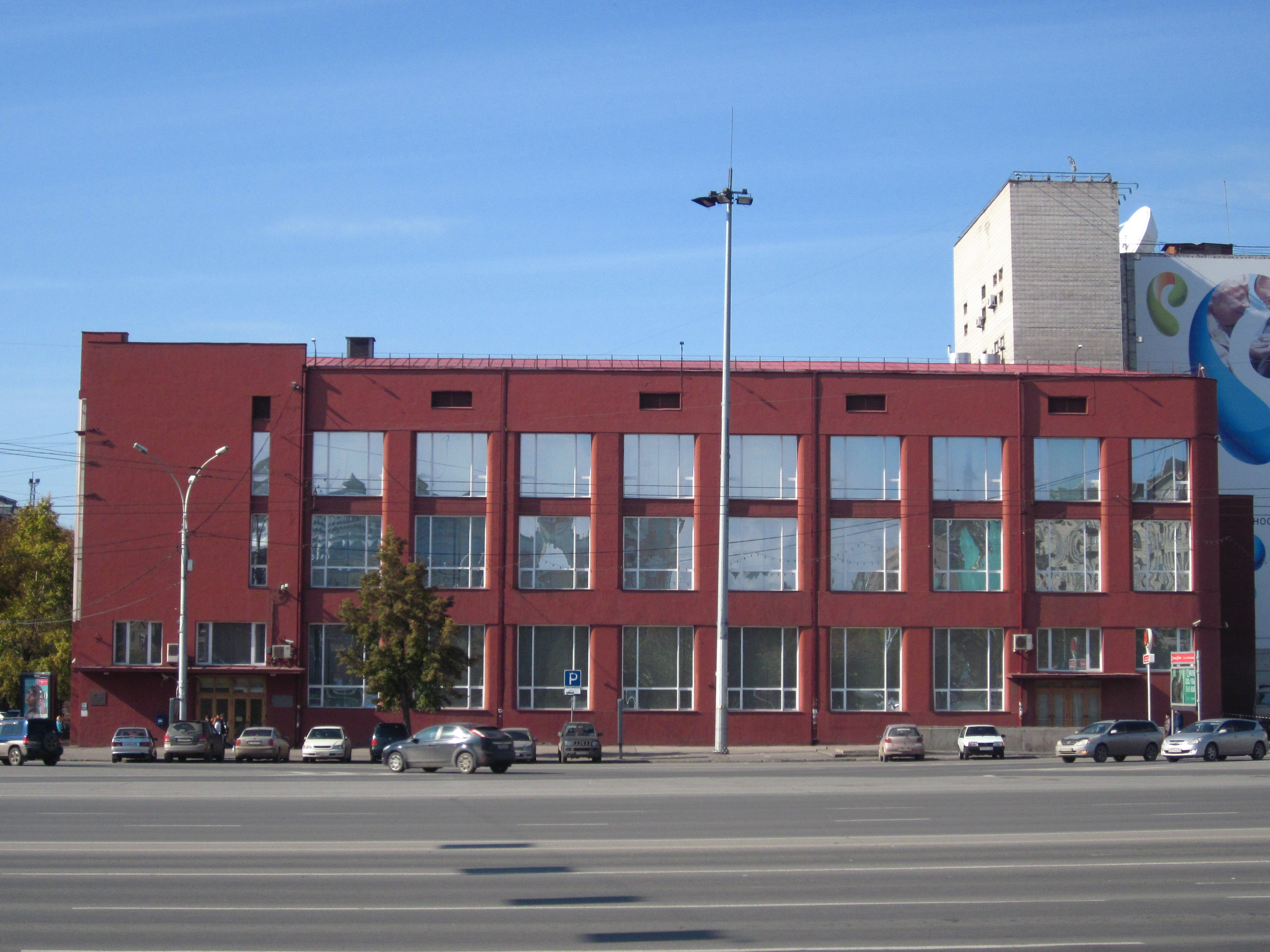
Gosbank Building

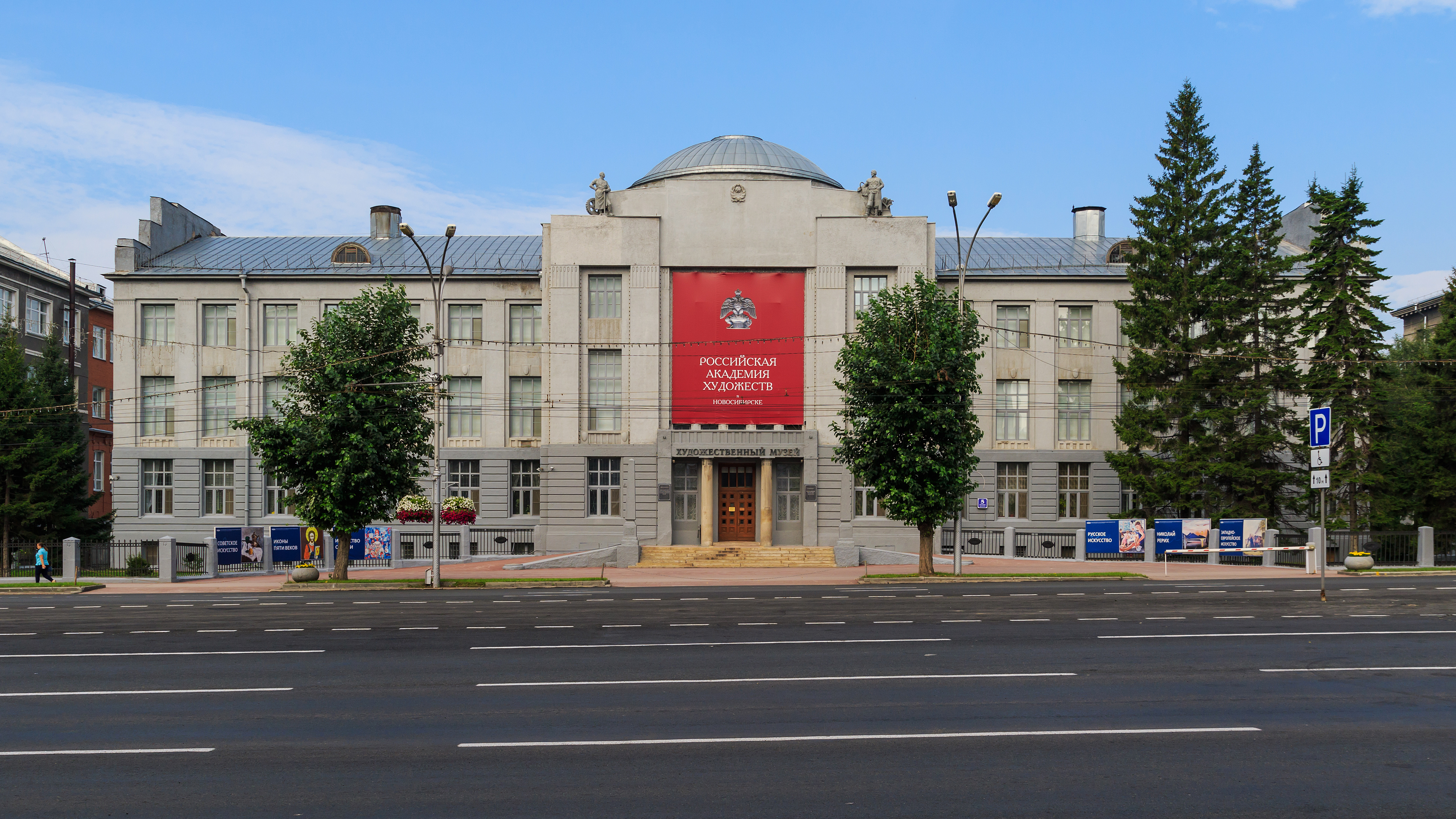
Sibrevcom Building

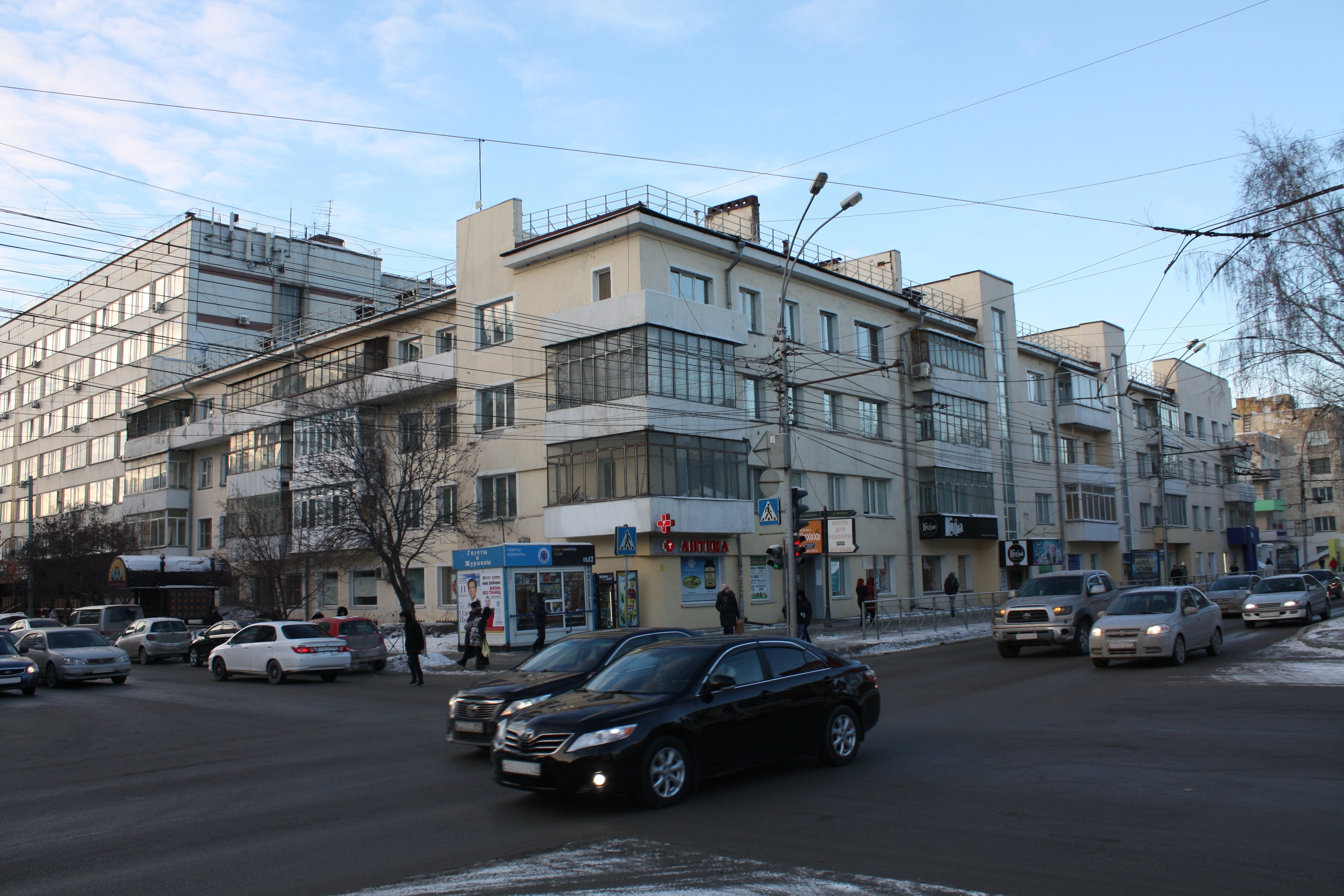
Kuzbassugol Building Complex

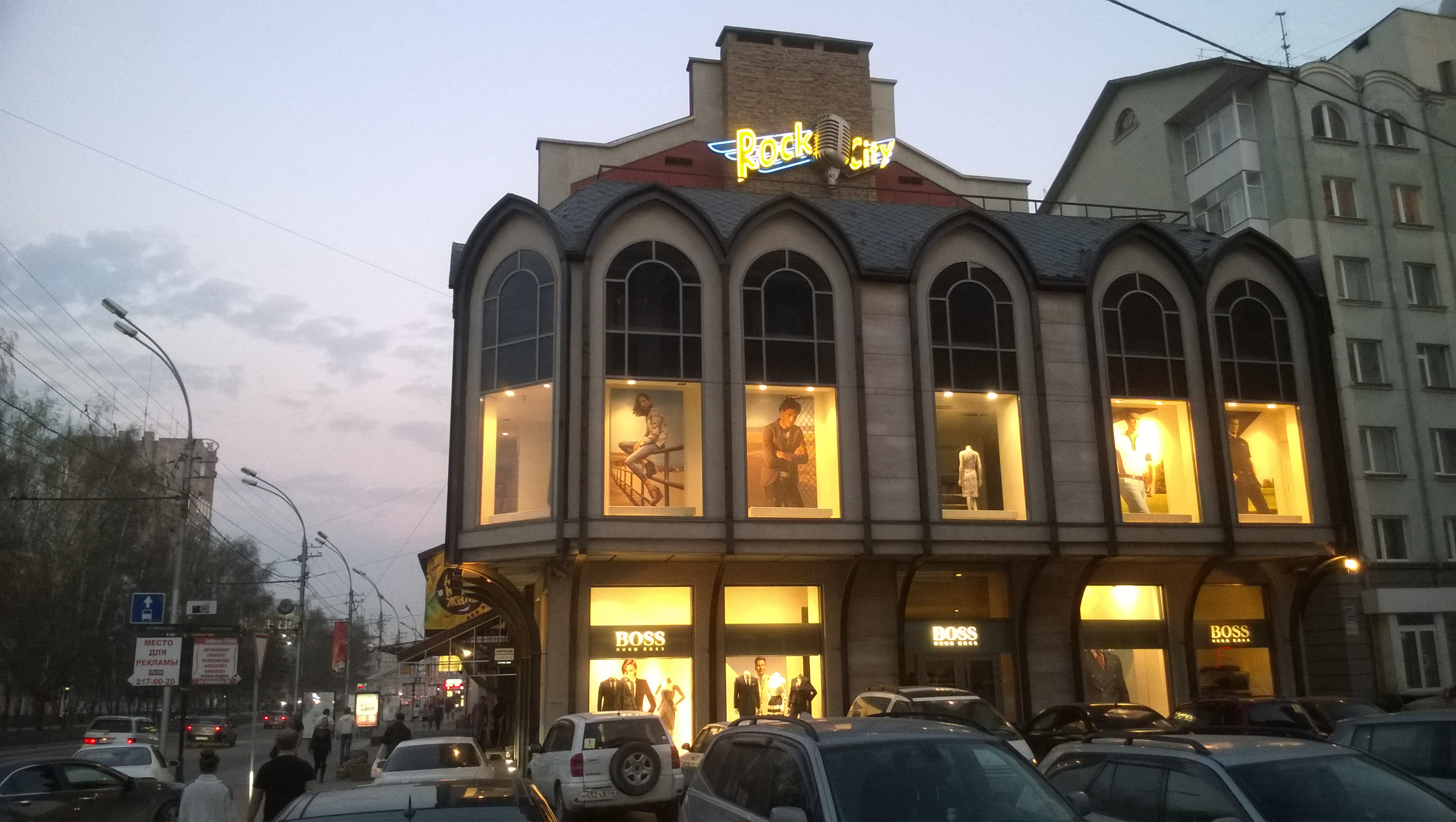
Krasny Avenue 37

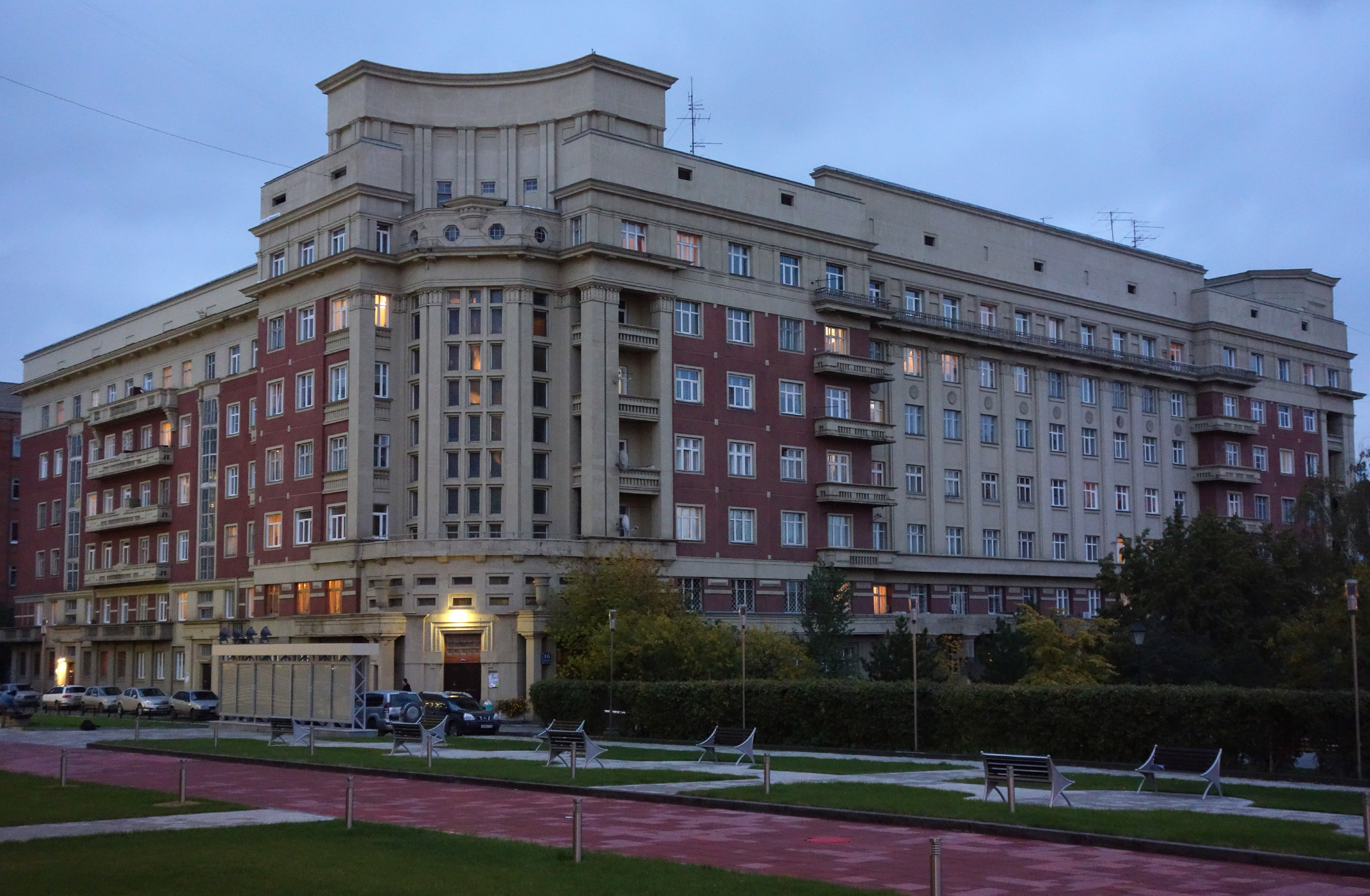
100-Flat Building

=== Odd side of the street ===
- No. 1а – Alexander Nevsky Cathedral (1899)
- No. 1 – Zapsibzoloto Building (1930–1932, A. I. Bobrov; 1936, architect: V. M. Teitel)
- No. 3 – The School of the House of Romanov (1911–1912, A. D. Kryachkov, K. M. Lukashevsky; 1928–1932, K. E. Osipov, A. I. Bobrov)
- No. 5 - Novosibirsk State Art Museum
- No. 9 – Mashtakov House (1903)
- No. 11 – Kraisnabsbyt Building (1931–1934, B. A. Gordeev, S. P. Turgenev, N. V. Nikitin)
- No. 13 – Sibstroyputi Building (1932, I. T. Voronov; 1933–1935, V. M. Teitel)
- No. 15 – Mayakovsky Cinema (1968, G. P. Zilberman, G. V. Gavrilov)
- No. 15/1 – Buzolina House
- No. 17а – Saint Nicholas Chapel (1914, A. D. Kryachkov; demolished in 1930; 1993, P. A. Chernobrovtsev; 1993–1999, painter: A. S. Chernobrovtsev)
- No. 23 – City Trade House (1909–1912, A. D. Kryachkov)
- No. 25 – Business House (1925–1926, D. F. Fridman, I. A. Burlakov)
- No. 27 – Gosbank Building (1929–1930, G. B. Barkhin, M. G. Barkhin, M. Y. Ginsburg, A. D. Kryachkov)
- No. 29 – Oblpotrebsoyuz Building or Sibkraisoyuz Building (1926, A. D. Kryachkov). The building located on the corner of Krasny Avenue and Ordzhonikidze Street
- No. 31 – Residential Building (1928–1930)
- No. 33 – Residential Building (1950s, V. K. Petrovsky)
- No. 41 – The Federal Service for Technical and Export Control
- No. 49–51 – Kuzbassugol Building Comlex (1931—1933, D. M. Ageev, B. A. Bitkin, B. A. Gordeyev)
- No. 53 – Army Staff Building (1934–1936, A. N. Shiryayev, Vengerov)
- No. 57 – Residential Building (1933)
- No. 59 – Residential House of the Red Army Officers (1931—1933, A. I. Bobrov)
- No. 63 – Officers' House (1915–1917, A. D. Kryachkov; 1926–1928, B. M. Blazhovsky; 1943–1944, P. I. Safonov; 1974)
- No. 67 – Siberian Research Institute of Geology, Geophysics and Mineral Resources
- No. 75 – Dormitory of Novosibirsk State Academy of Water Transport
- No. 101 – Royal Park Shopping Centre (2007)
- No. 157/1 – House of Project Institutes
- No. 167 – 'Progress' Palace of Culture
- No. 171/4 – 'Energia' House of Culture

=== Even side of the street ===
- No. 6 – Sibmetaltrest Building (1929, D. M. Ageyev)
- No. 8 – Residential Building (1930s)
- No. 10 – Prombank Dormitory (1926–1927, I. A. Burlakov)
- No. 12 – Saburov House (1908)
- No. 16 – 100-Flat Building (1934–1937, A. D. Krychkov, V. S. Maslennikov, at the Exposition Internationale des Arts et Techniques dans la Vie Moderne in Paris on December 11, 1937, the project was awarded the 1st degree diploma, a gold medal, and a Grand Prix)
- No. 18 – Building of the Government of the Novosibirsk Oblast (1930—1932, A. D. Krychkov, B. A. Gordeyev, S. P. Turgenev, N. V. Nikitin, I. V. Kositsin, K. K. Leonov)
- No. 18/1 – State Concert Hall named after Arnold Katz (2013)
- No. 22 – Houses of Surikov and Molchanov
- No. 24 – Residential Building (1925)
- No. 26 – Russian-Asian Bank
- No. 26а – Novosibirsk Oblast Youth Library
- No. 28 – Dinamo Residential Complex (1930–1932, B. A. Gordeyev, S. P. Turgenev, N. V. Nikitin)
- No. 30 – NII-39 Residential Building (1953, G. F. Kravtsov)
- No. 32 – House of Lenin (1924–1926, I. I. Zagrivko, M. Kuptsov, V. M. Teitel)
- No. 34 – Prombank Building (1925—1926, A. V. Shvidkovsky, G. P. Golz, S. N. Kozhin; 1935—1954, N. S. Kuzmin, V. A. Dobrolyubov)
- No. 36 – Novosibirsk Opera and Ballet Theatre (1931–1941, T. Y. Bardt, M. I. Kurilko, A. Z. Grinberg and others)
- No. 38 – Building of State Institutions (1923–1924, A. D. Kryachkov; 1933–1936, S. M. Ignatovich)
- No. 44 – Aeroflot House (1930s)
- No. 46 – Oblsberkassa Building (1936)
- No. 48 – Gymnasium No. 1
- No. 50 – Dom Byta
- No. 52 – Novosibirsk State Medical Academy
- No. 54 – Institute of Mining of the SB RAS
- No. 56 – Oblplan House
- No. 60 – Residential Building (1950s)
- No. 62 – 'The General's House' (1937–1941, K, E, Osipov)
- No. 68 – The Wedding Palace
- No. 72 – Novosibirsk Aviation Technical College
- No. 78 – Residential Building (1955)
- No. 82 – Sovnarkhoz Building
- No. 84 – Institute of the Federal Security Service
- No. 184 – Novosibirsk Urban Planning Project Institute

== Transportation ==
=== Metro ===
Four Novosibirsk Metro stations are located on the street: Ploshchad Lenina, Krasny Prospekt, Gagarinskaya and Zayeltsovskaya.

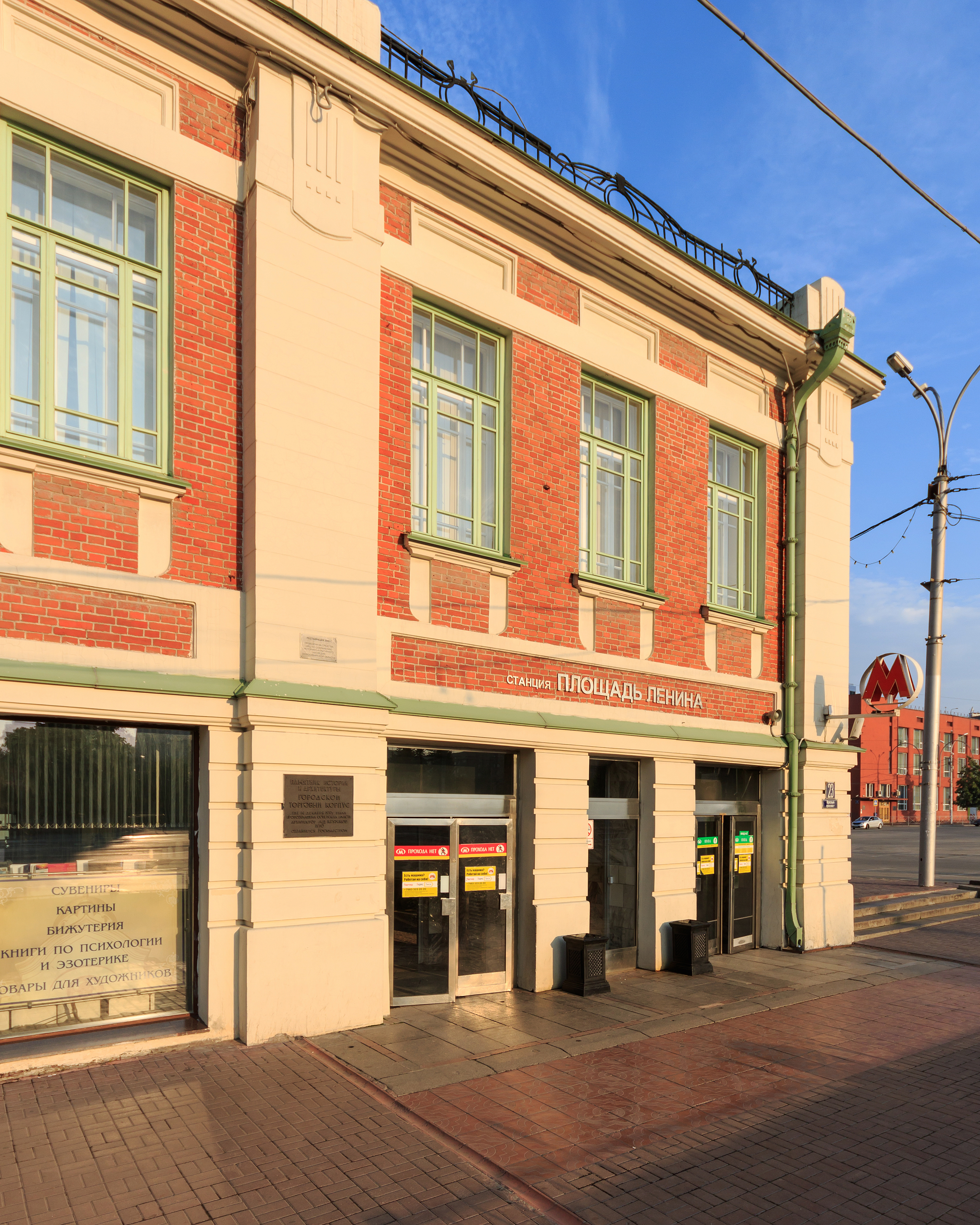
Entrance to Ploschad Lenina Station

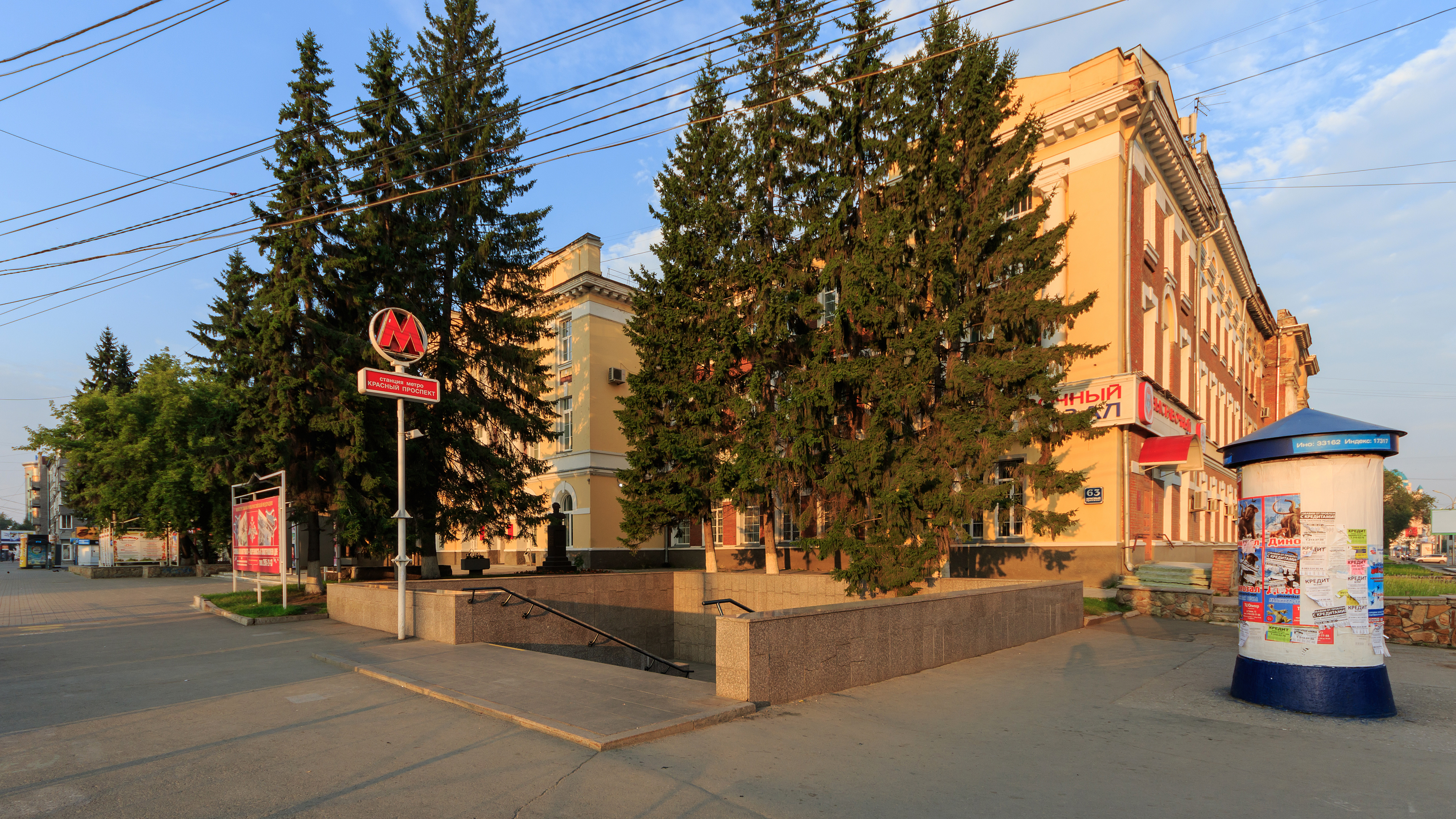
One of entrances to Krasny Prospekt Station

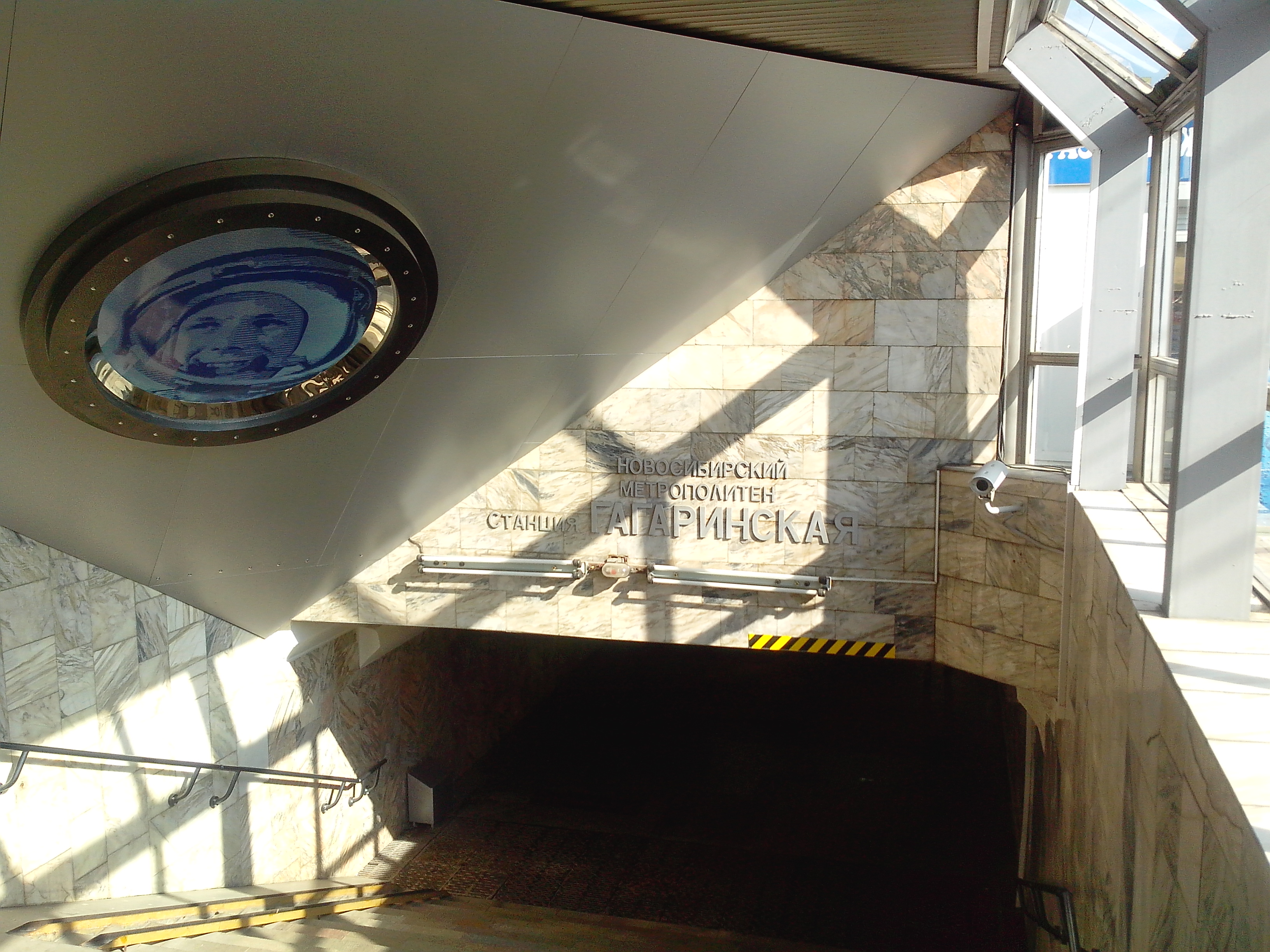
Entrance to Gagarinskaya Station

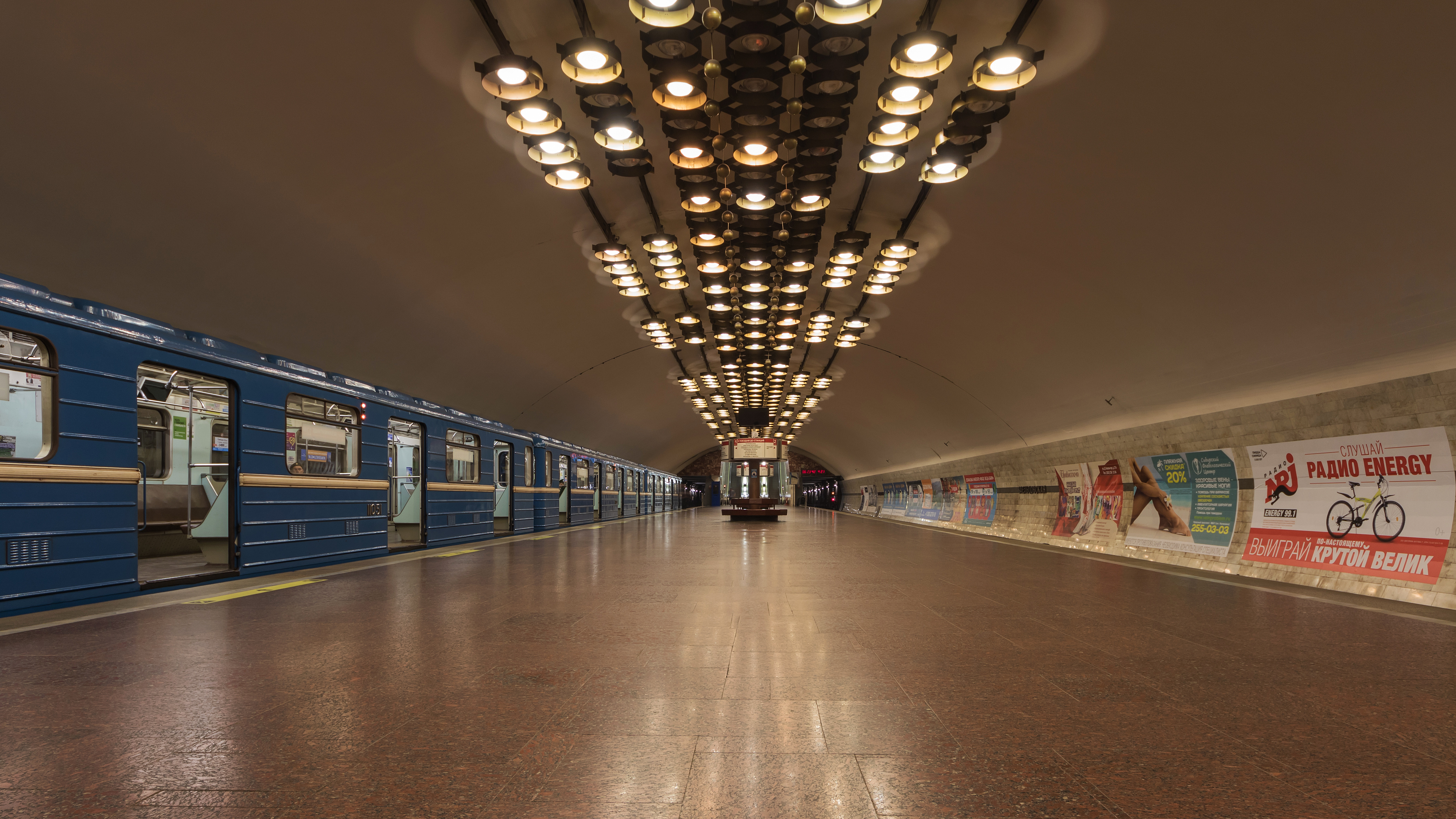
Zayeltsovskaya Station

== Notable residents ==
- Boris Galushchak was a director of the Novosibirsk Instrument-Building Plant. He lived in the 100-Flat Building.
- Nikolay Gritsyuk was a Novosibirsk painter. He lived in the 100-Flat Building.
- Yevgeny Meshlkin was an academician, famous Soviet and Russian cardiologist and cardiac surgeon. He lived in the 100-Flat Building.
- Yevgeny Mravinsky was a Soviet and Russian conductor. He lived in the 100-Flat Building.
- Alexander Tikhonov is a Soviet biathlete, multiple Olympic medalist. He lived in the 100-Flat Building.
- Nikolay Cherkasov was a Soviet actor and a People's Artist of the USSR. He lived in the 100-Flat Building.
