= Kuzbassugol Building Complex =

Building in Novosibirsk, Russia

- Жилой комбинат «Кузбассуголь»
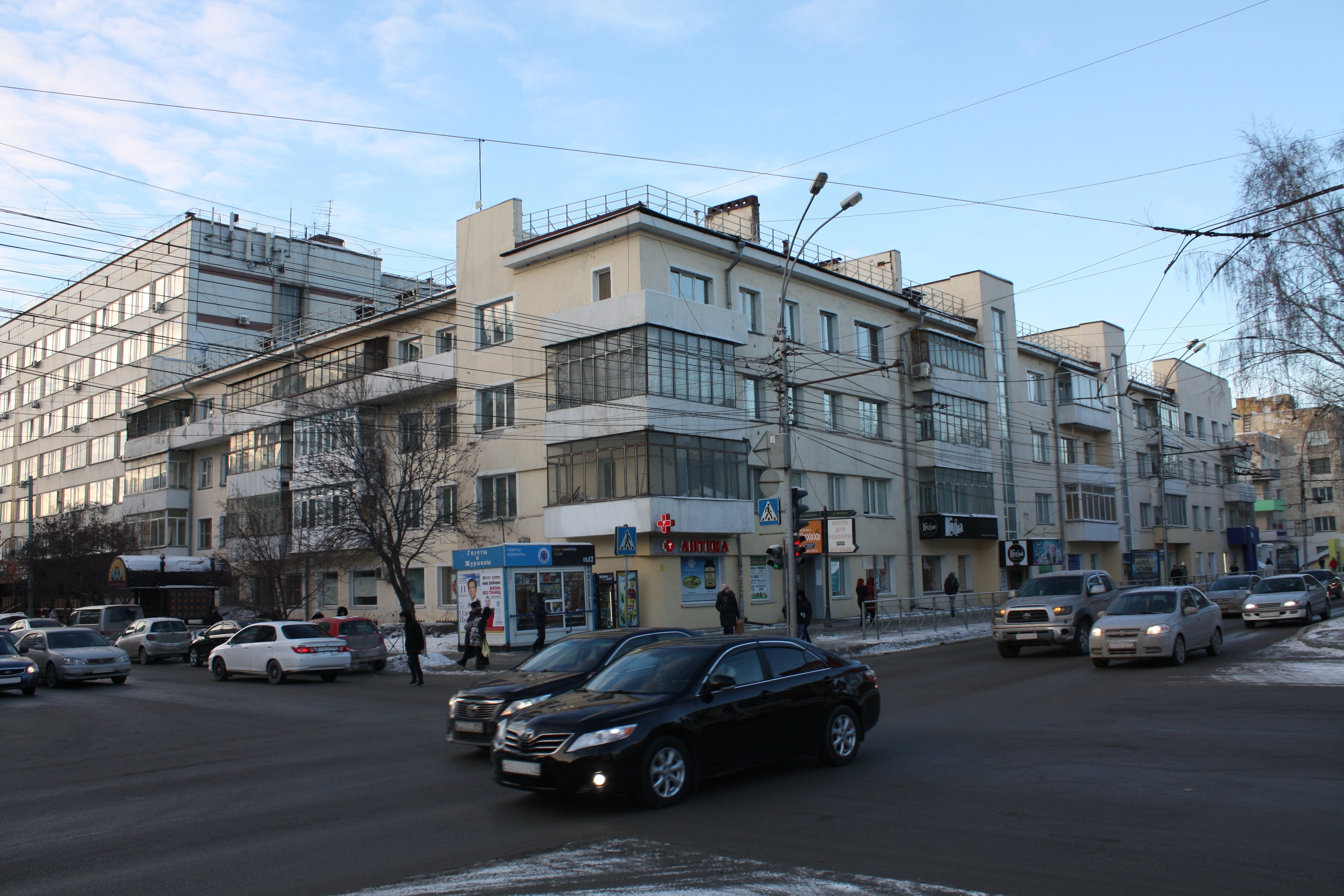
- Interactive map of the Kuzbassugol Building Complex area

General information
- Architectural style: constructivism
- Location: Novosibirsk, Russia
- Construction started: 1931
- Completed: 1933

Kuzbassugol Building Complex (Russian: Жилой комбинат «Кузбассуголь») is a building complex located in the Tsentralny City District of Novosibirsk, Russia. It was built in 1931–1933. Architects: B. A. Gordeyev, D. A. Ageyev, B. A. Bitkin.

== Location ==
The building complex is located in the city block between Sovetskaya, Frunze, Derzhavin streets and Krasny Avenue opposite Oblplan House. It consists of 6 residential buildings and one school.

== Gallery ==
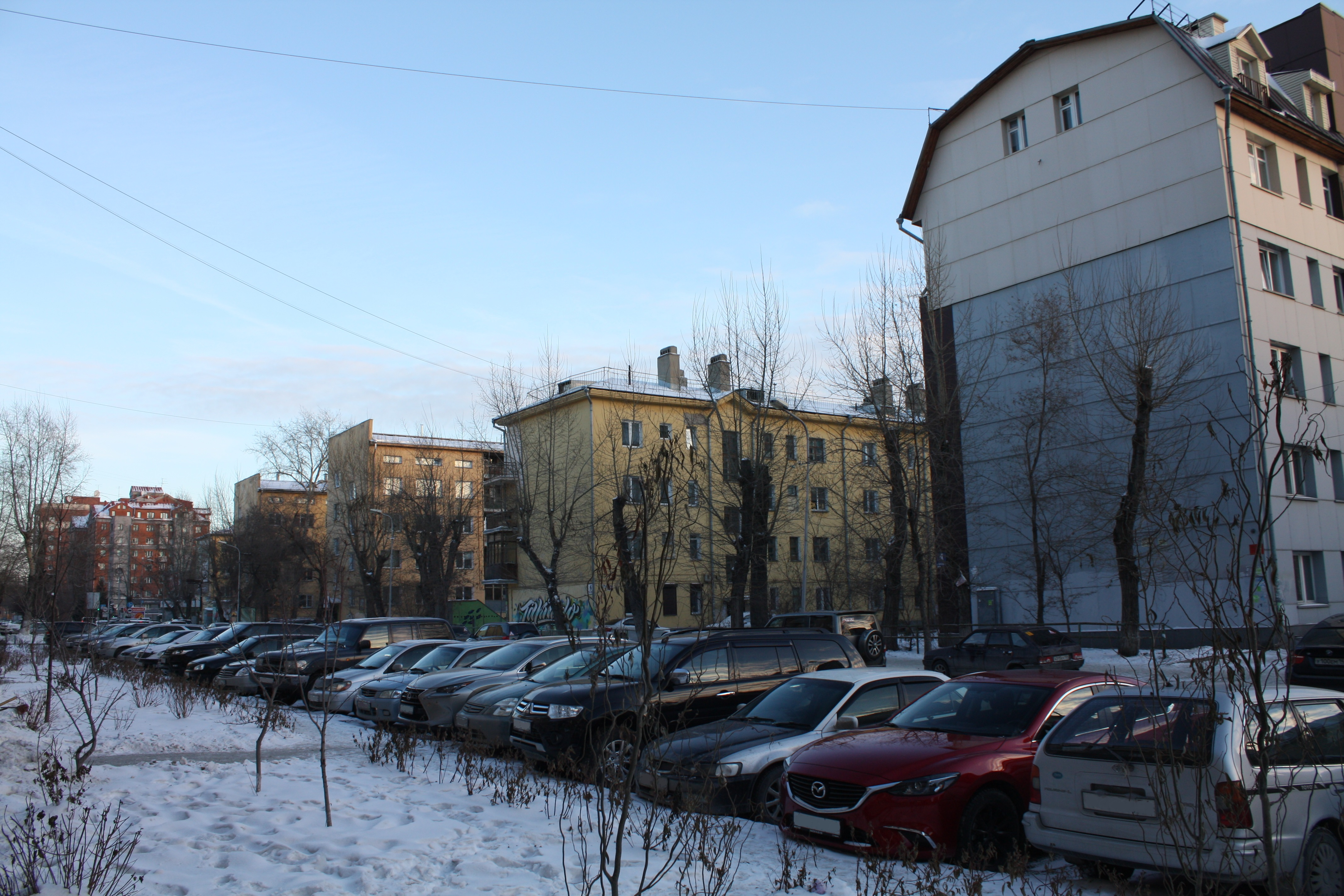

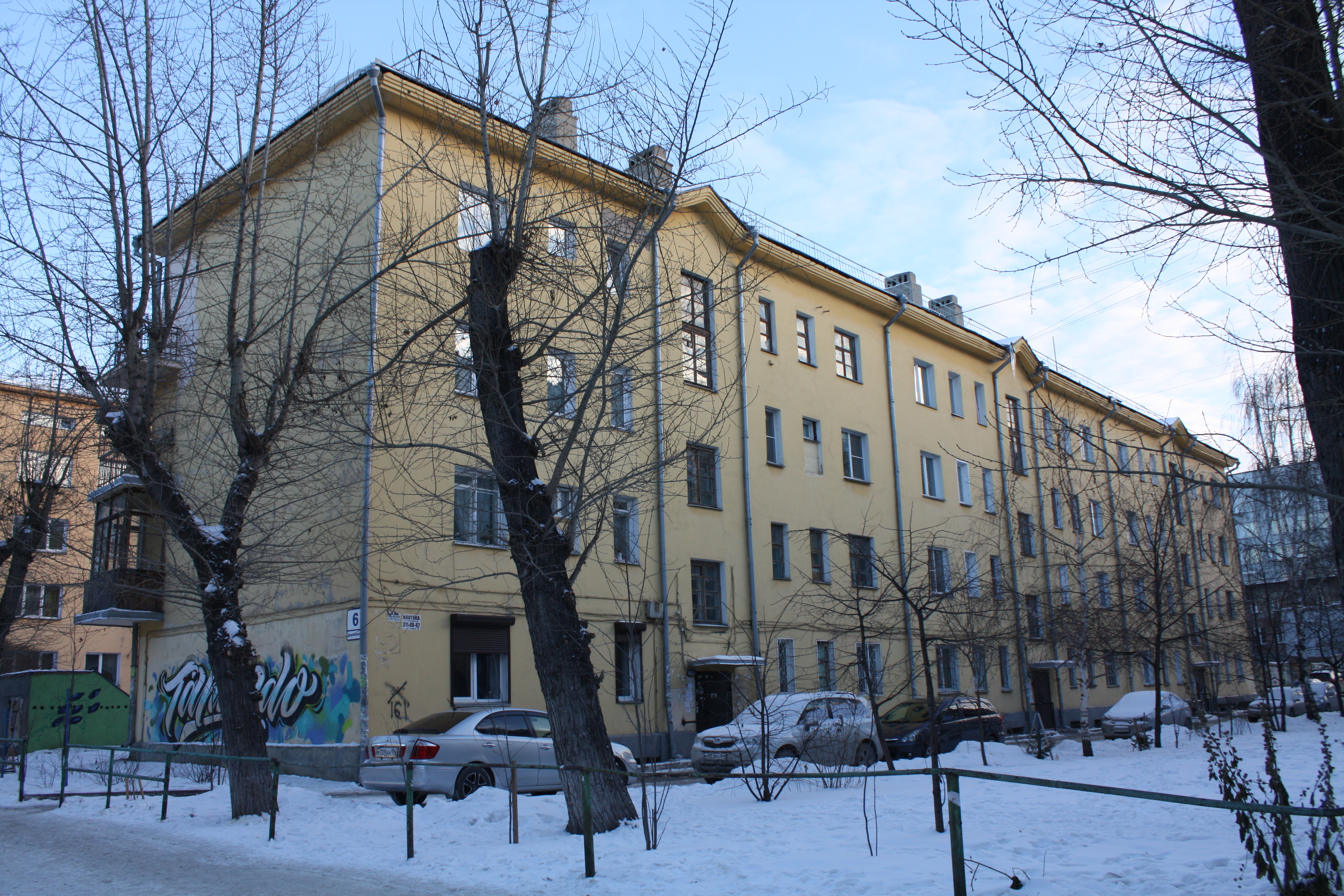

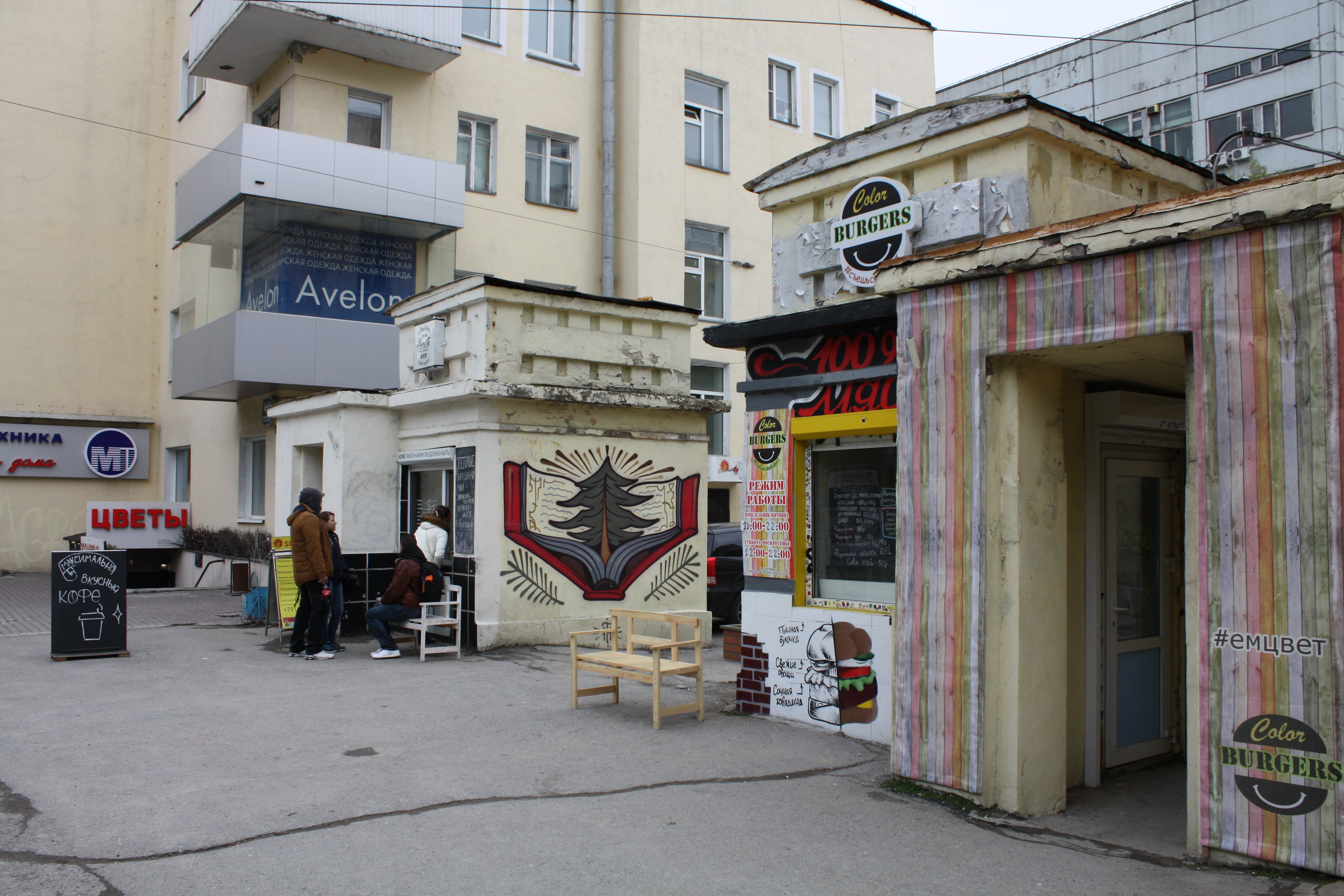

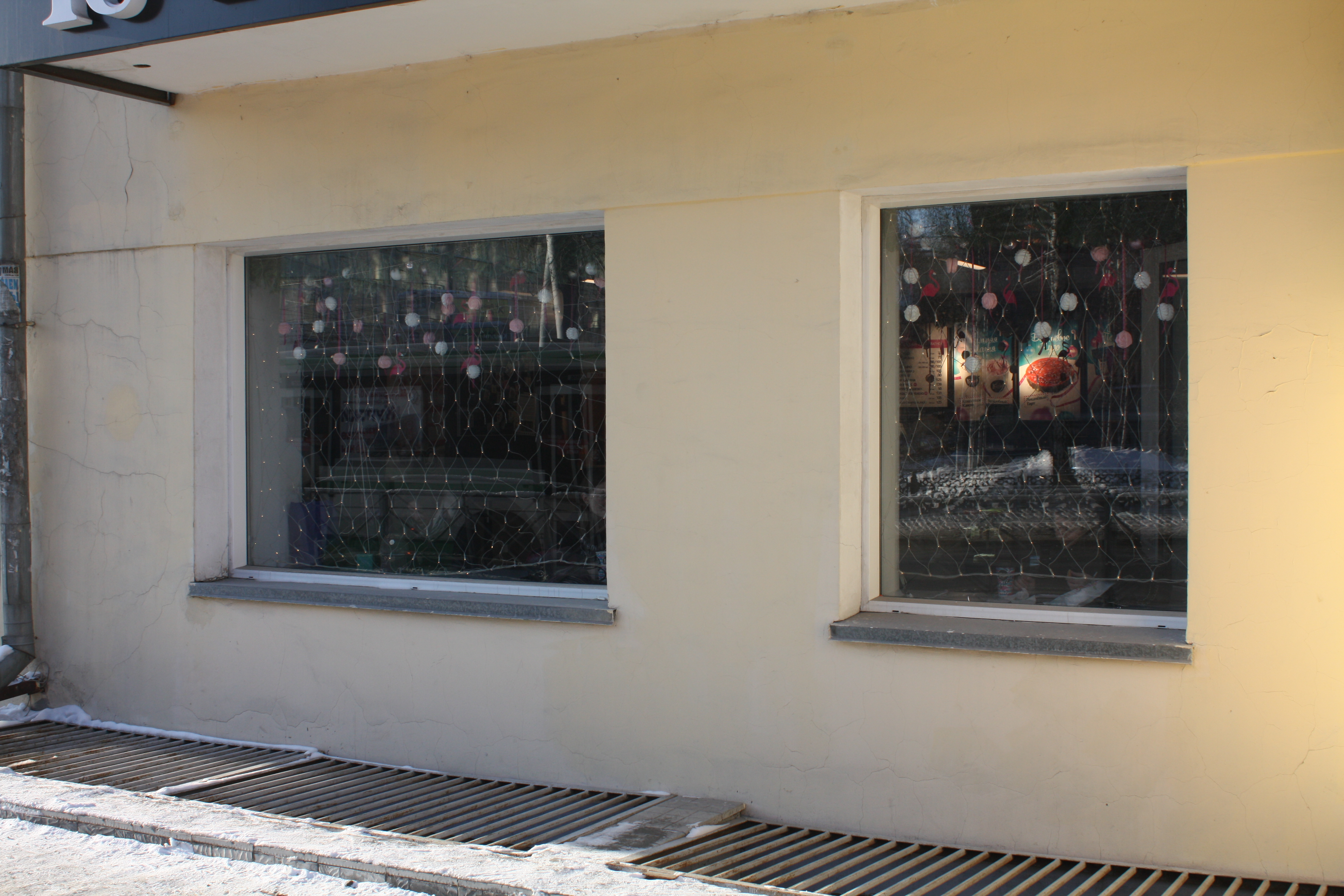

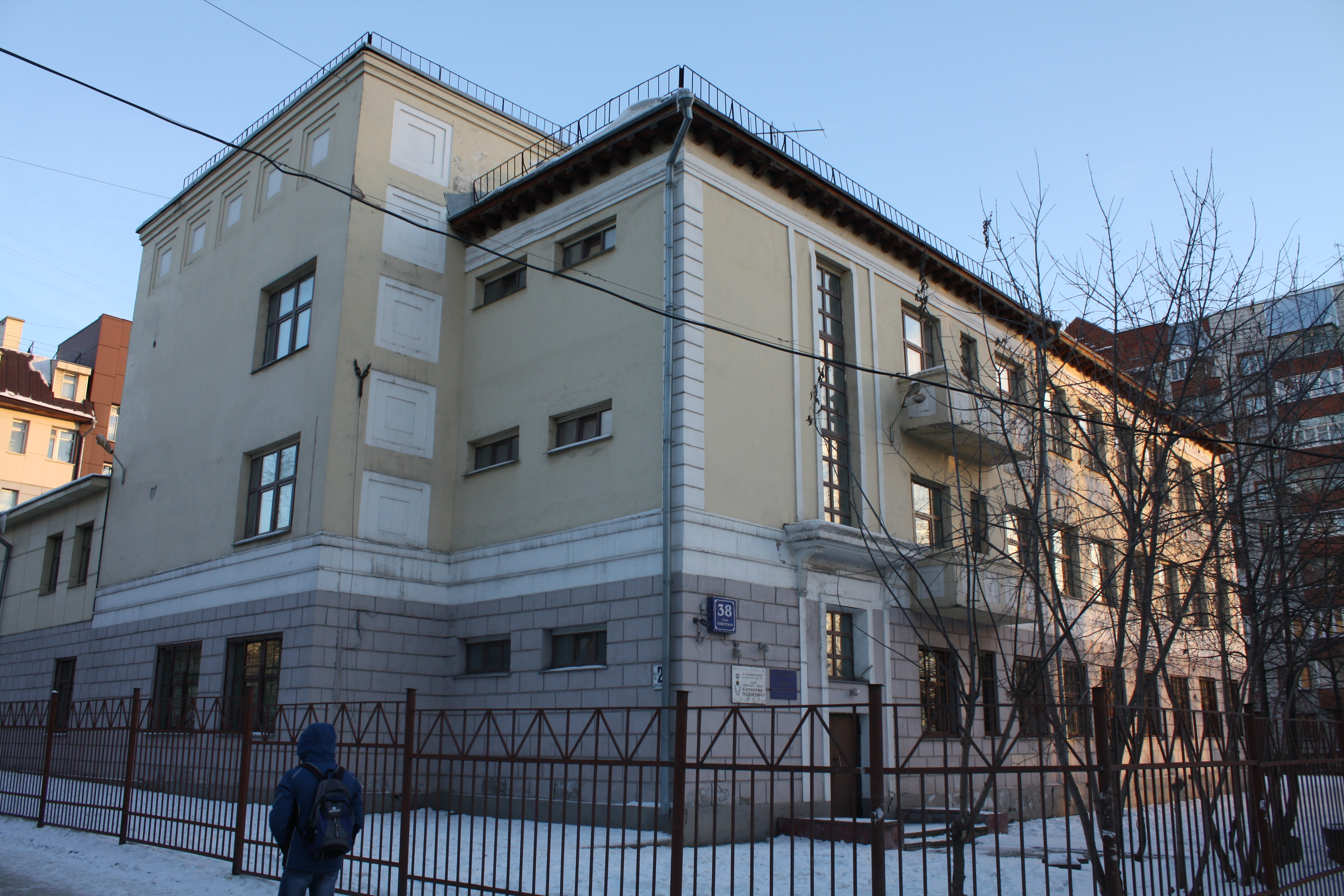
School No. 54. The corner of Sovetskaya and Derzhavin streets

== See also ==
- Polyclinic No. 1
- Sotsgorod of Sibkombain
- Aeroflot House
