= City Trade House =

Building in Novosibirsk, Russia

- Городской торговый корпус
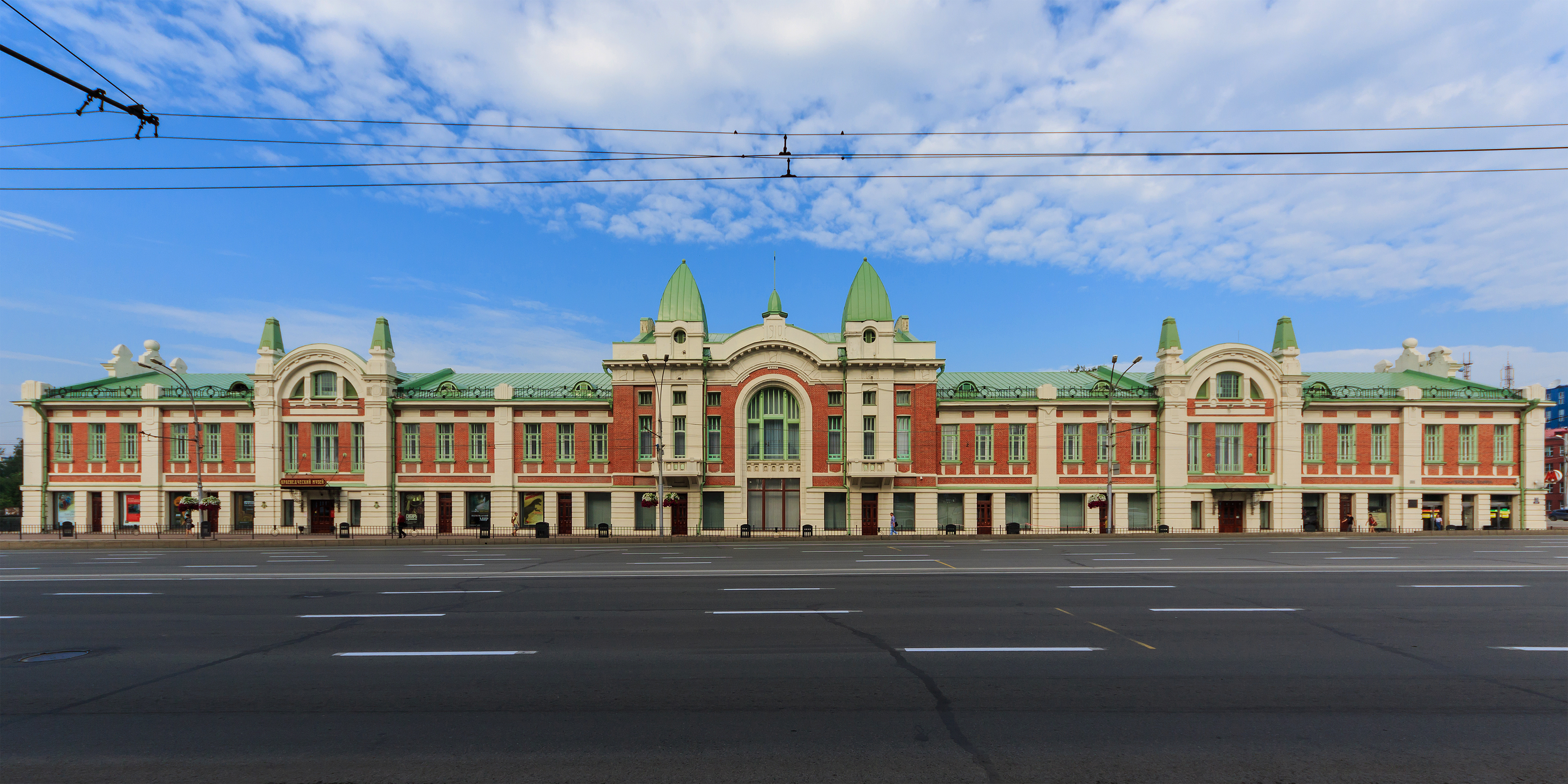
- Interactive map of the City Trade House area

General information
- Location: Krasny Avenue 23, Novosibirsk, Russia
- Coordinates: 55.0288°N 82.9202°E
- Construction started: 1910
- Completed: 1911

Design and construction
- Architect: Andrey Kryachkov

City Trade House (Russian: Городской торговый корпус) is a building in Tsentralny City District of Novosibirsk, Russia. It is located at Krasny Avenue. The building was designed by architect Andrey Kryachkov.

== History ==
The City Trade House was built in 1910–1911.

In Tsarist times, the building was occupied by various shops and the city government.

Since 1985 the Novosibirsk State Museum of Local Lore occupies the building.

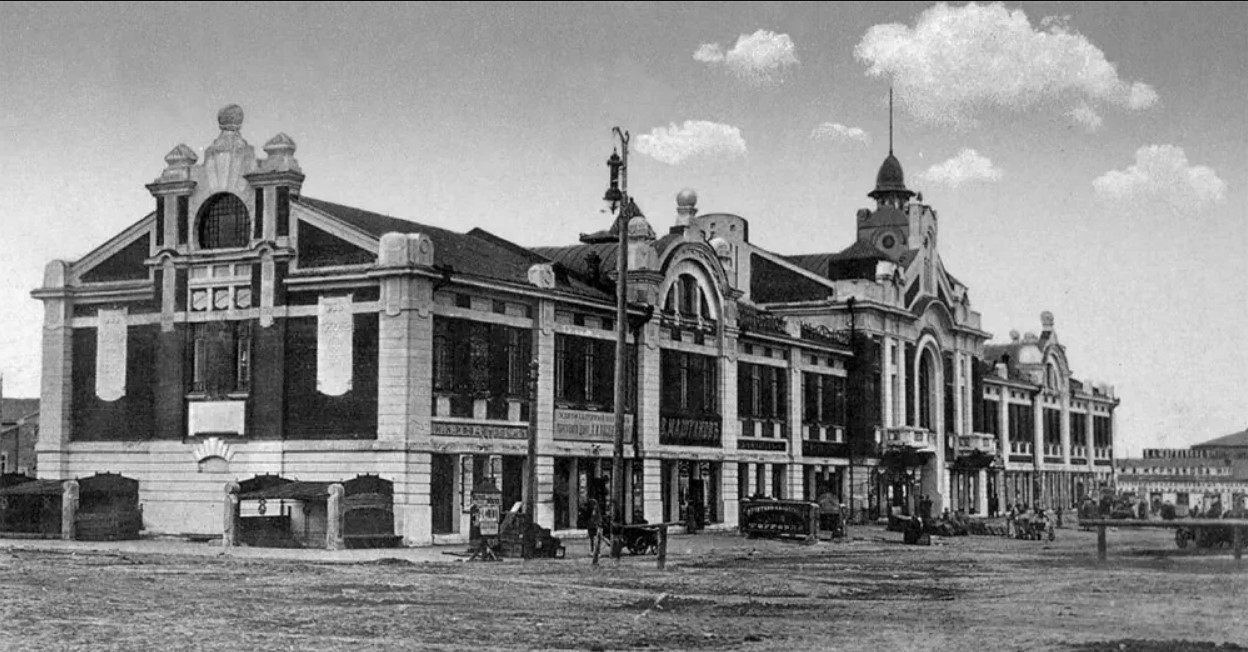

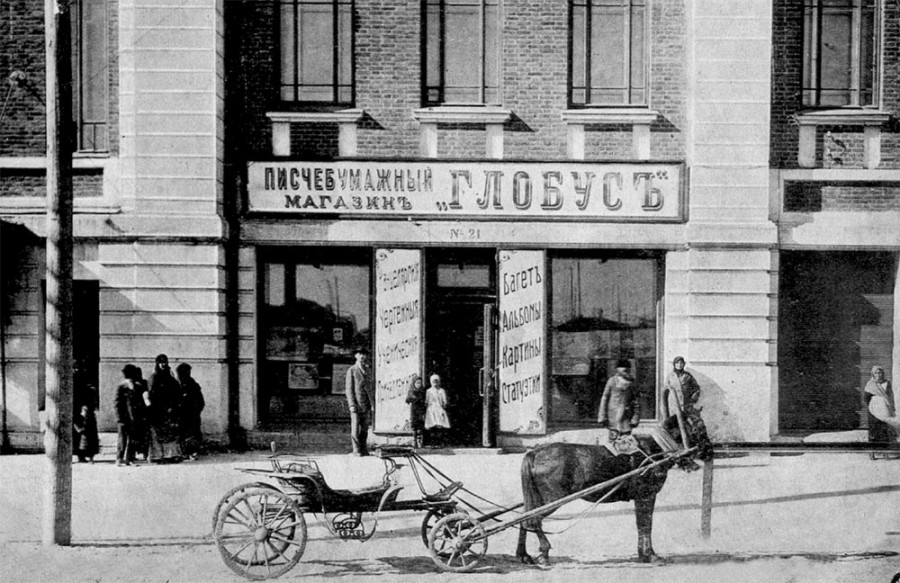

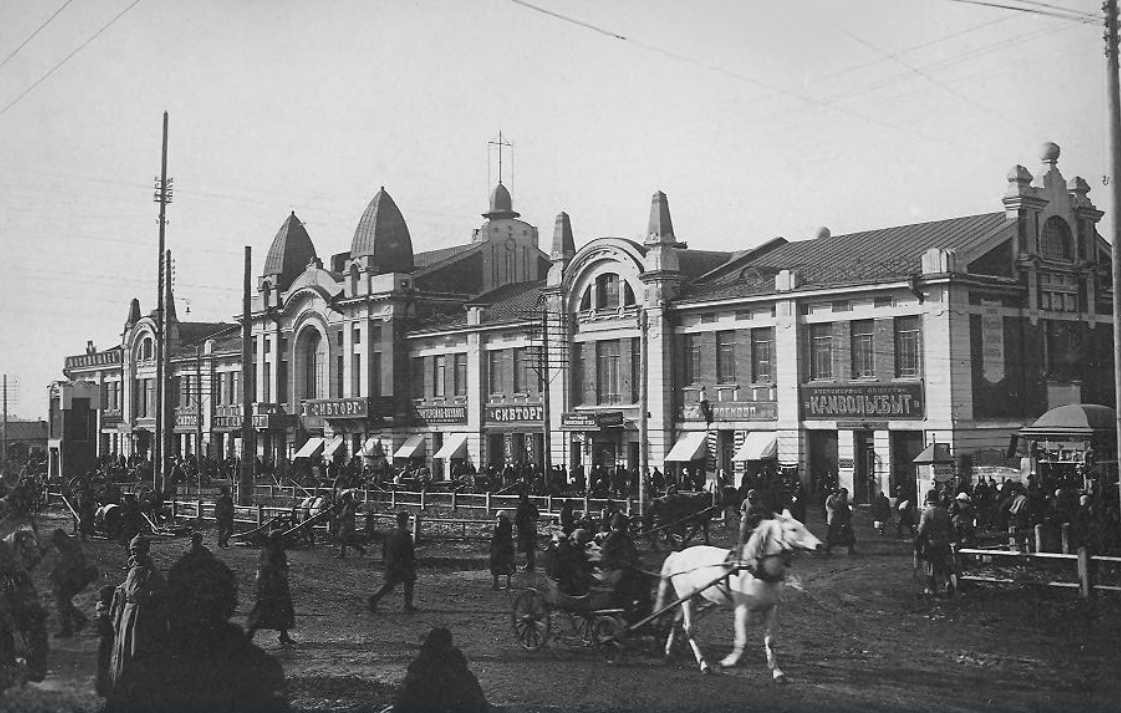

== Gallery ==
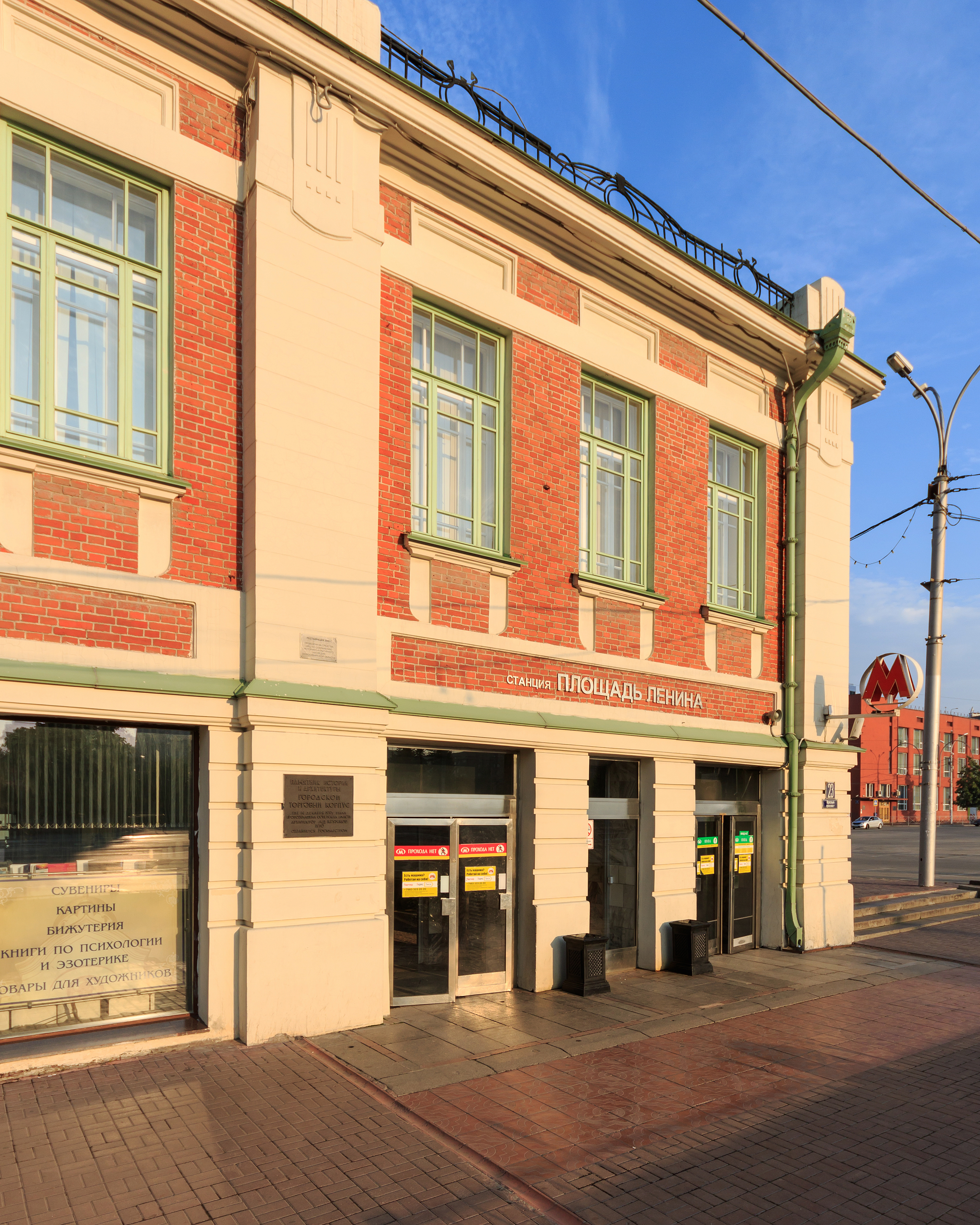

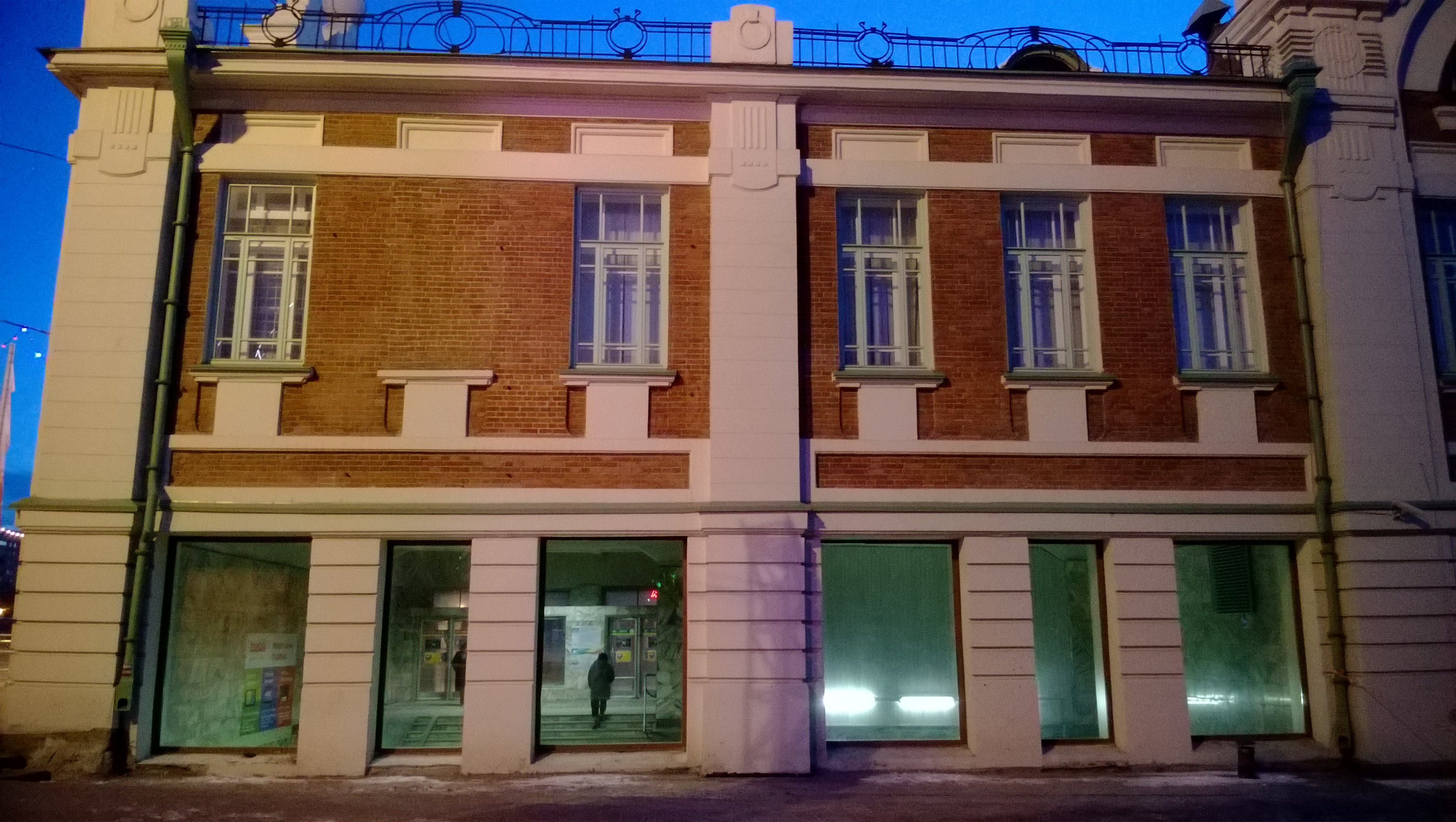

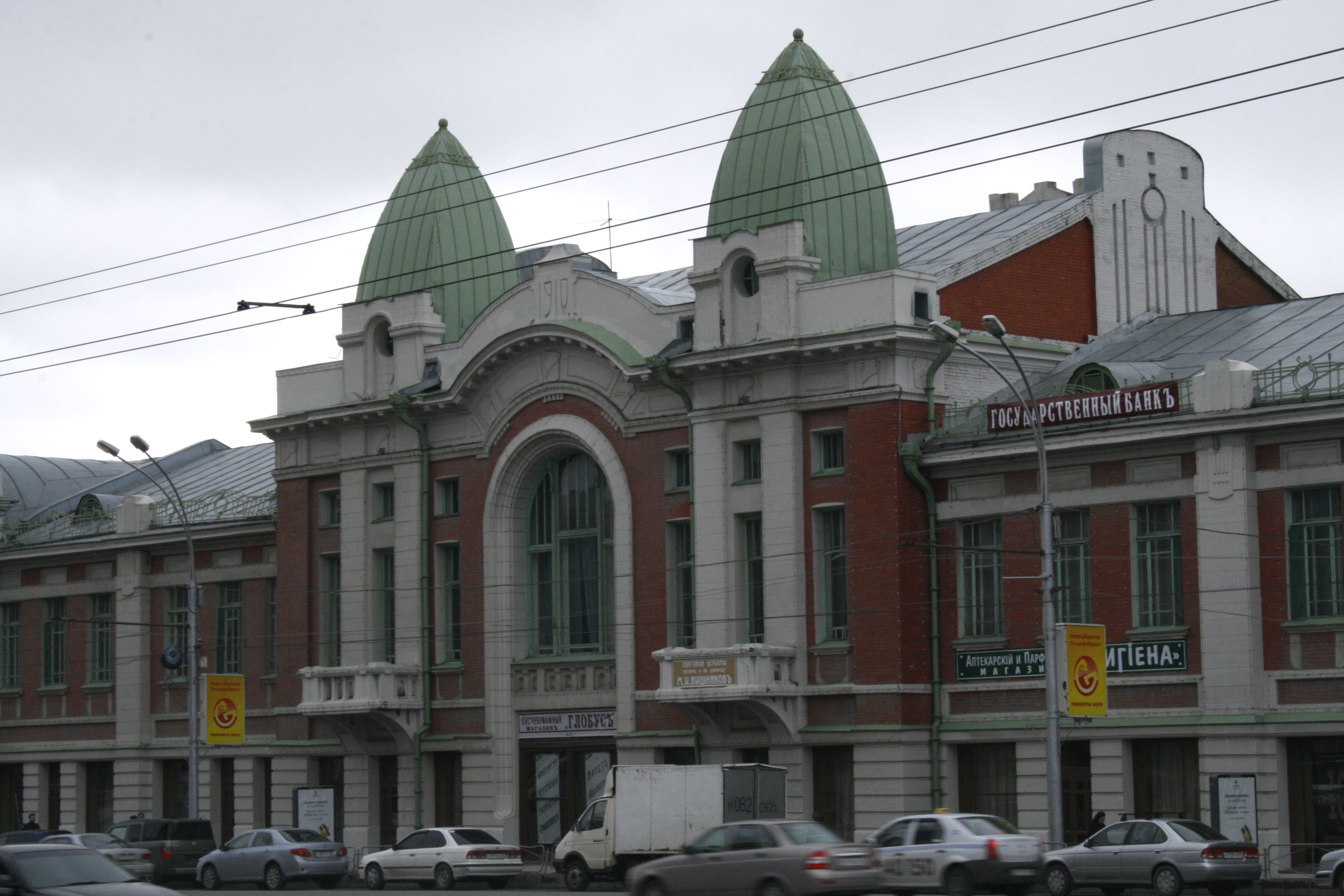

== Bibliography ==
- Ламин В. А. (2003). Энциклопедия. Новосибирск. Новосибирск: Новосибирское книжное издательство. p. 220. ISBN 5-7620-0968-8.
