= Kalinin Square, Novosibirsk =

Square in Novosibirsk, Russia

Kalinin Square
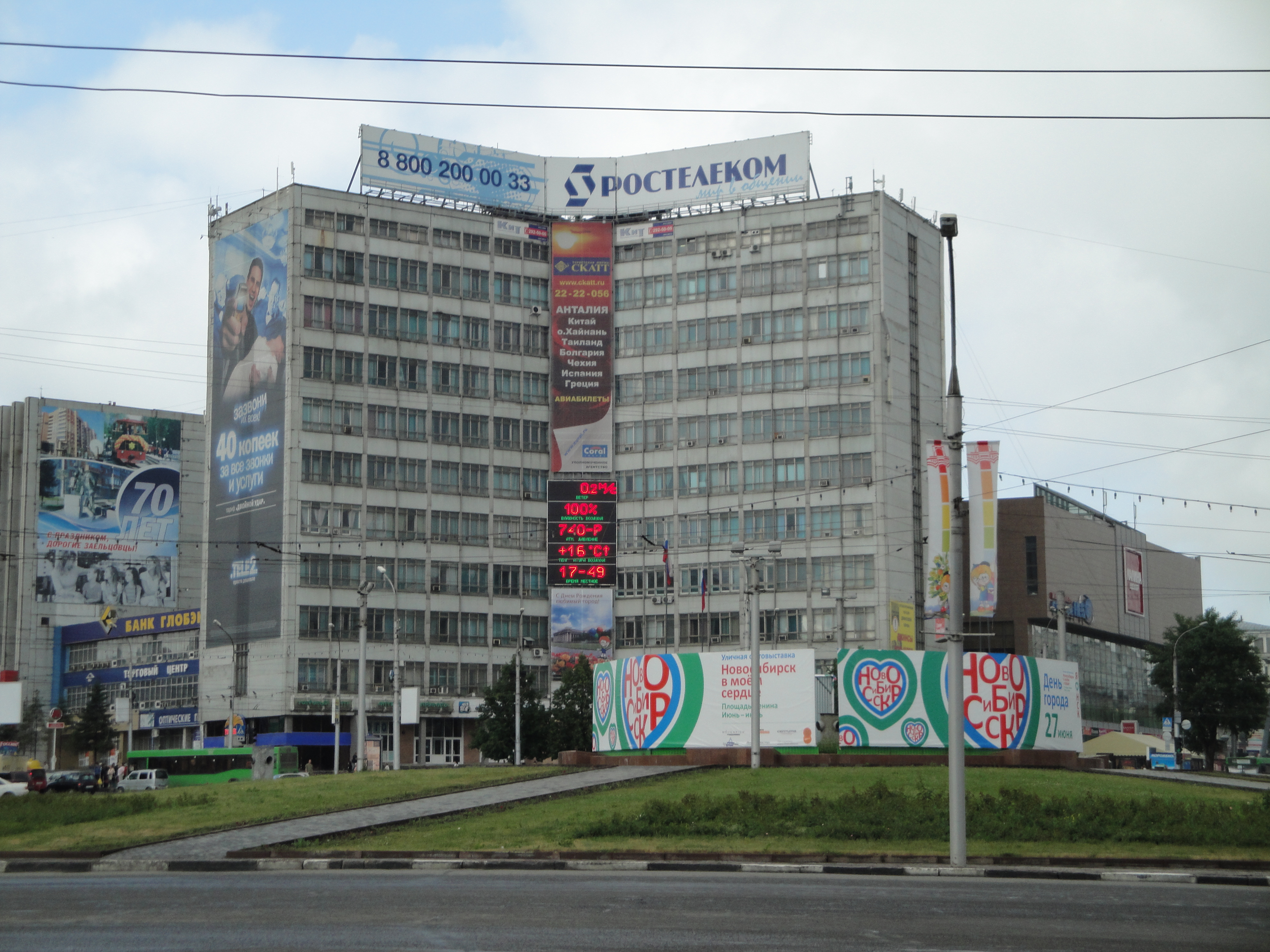
- Native name: Площадь Калинина (Russian)
- Location: Novosibirsk; Russia
- Nearest metro station: Zayeltsovskaya
- Coordinates: 55°03′34″N 82°54′45″E

Kalinin Square is a square in Zayeltsovsky District of Novosibirsk, Russia. It is located at the intersection of Krasny Avenue and Dusi Kovalchuk Street. Perevozchikov Street is also adjacent to the square.

== Architecture ==
The architectural appearance of the square was formed in the 1960s. It is surrounded by three identical 7-storey residential buildings, 8-storey residential building, the building of the Novosibirsk Instrument-Building Plant and the Building of Design Organizations.

== Transport ==
Kalinin Square is one of the largest transport hubs on the right bank of Novosibirsk. There are stops for buses, trolleybuses, marshrutkas and trams, as well as 4 entrances to the Zayeltsovskaya Metro Station.
