= Siberian Research Institute of Geology, Geophysics and Mineral Resources =

Research institute in Tsentralny District of Novosibirsk, Russia

Siberian Research Institute of Geology, Geophysics and Mineral Resource
- Established: 1957
- Director: Mikhail Epov
- Owner: Siberian Branch of RAS
- Address: Krasny Avenue 67, Novosibirsk, 630091, Russia; Krasny Avenue 35, Novosibirsk, 630099, Russia; Potaninskaya 6, Novosibirsk, 630099, Russia
- Location: Novosibirsk, Russia
- Website: www.sniiggims.ru

Siberian Research Institute of Geology, Geophysics and Mineral Resources (Russian: Сибирский научно-исследовательский институт геологии, геофизики и минерального сырья) is a research institute in Tsentralny District of Novosibirsk, Russia. It was founded in 1957.

== History ==
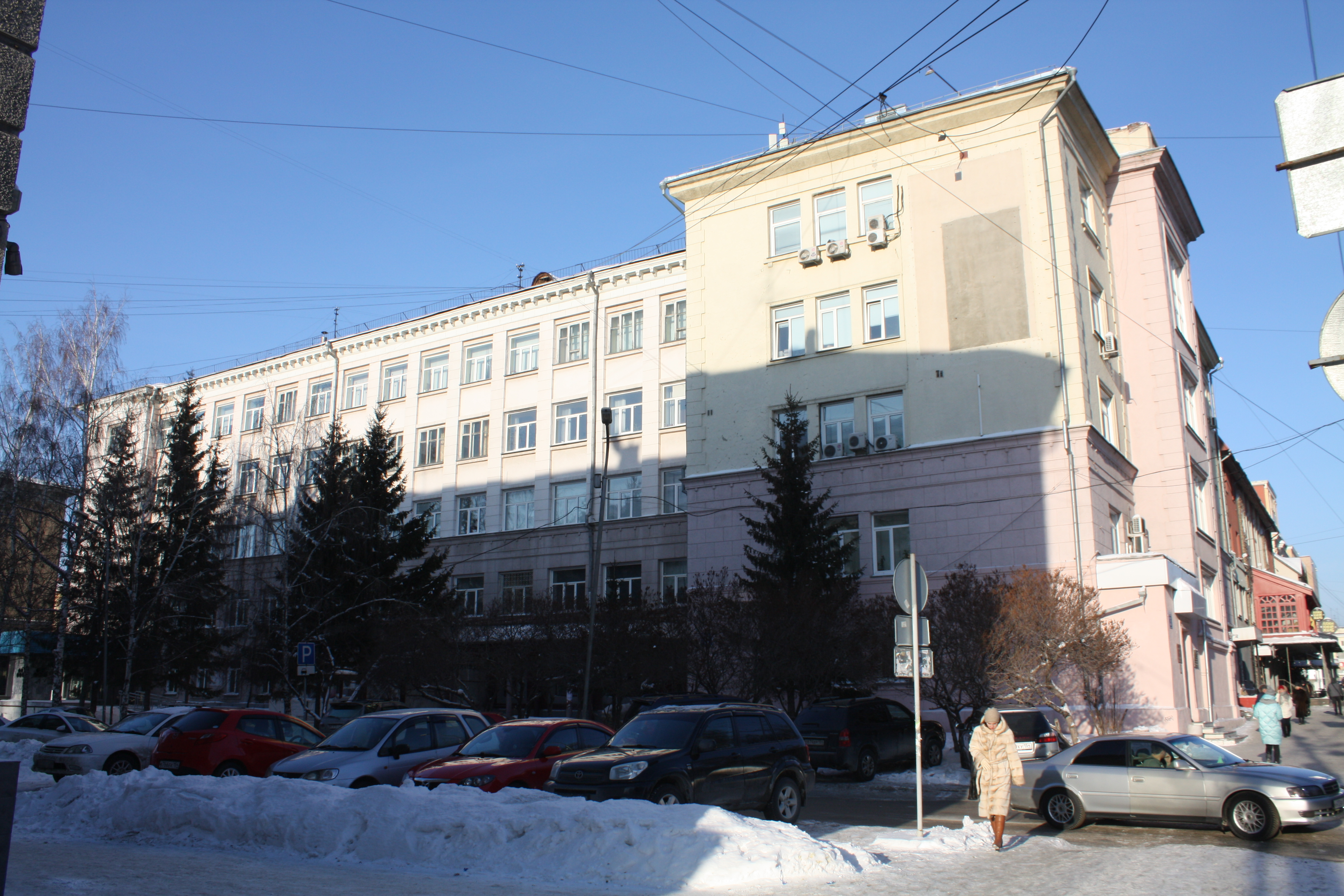
Former building of Institute (Krasny Avenue 35)

The research organization was established in 1957. In 1960, the main scientific activity of the institute was associated with oil development in the West Siberian Lowland.

== Scientific activity ==
Research institute is engaged in the mineral prospecting.

== Number of employees ==
- 1967 – 1048 employees (8 Doctors of Sciences, 71 Candidates of Sciences and 448 specialists with higher education);
- 1996 – 569 employees;
- 1999 – 613 employees;
- 2007 – 700 employees (1 Academician, 22 Doctors of Sciences and 87 Candidates of Sciences).

== Geological Museum ==
There is the Geological Museum at the Institute. It is located on Krasny Avenue 35.
