= Sotsgorod of Sibkombain =

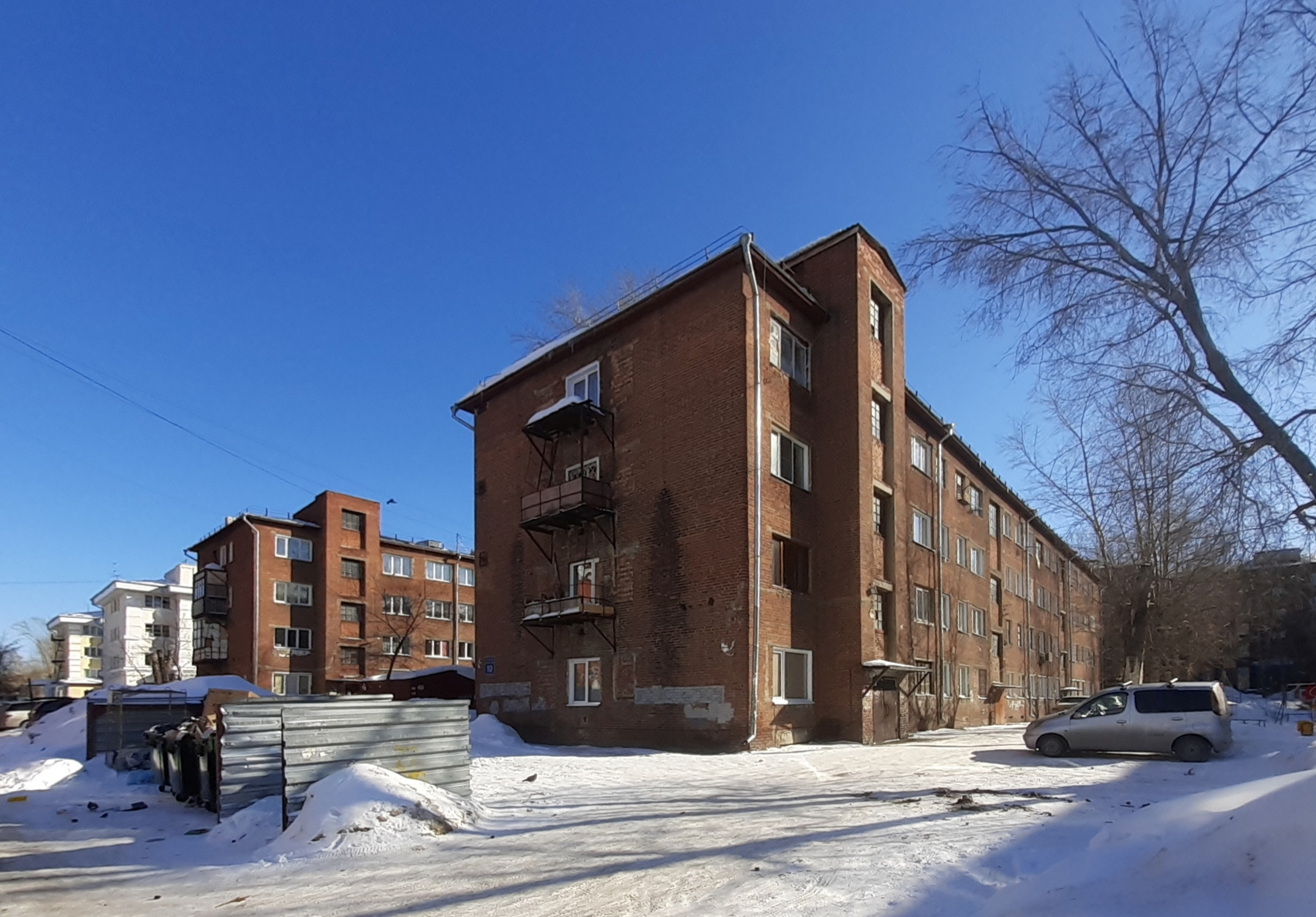
- Interactive map of Sotsgorod of Sibkombain
- Country: Russia
- City: Novosibirsk
- District: Leninsky District

Sotsgorod of Sibkombain (Russian: Соцгород завода «Сибкомбайн») is a microdistrict in Leninsky District of Novosibirsk, Russia. It was built in the 1930s.

== History ==
The establishment of the Sibkombain Plant in the left bank of Novosibirsk have led to a large-scale construction of residential buildings for workers. According to the plan, the future settlement should have been a socialist city (sotsgorod).

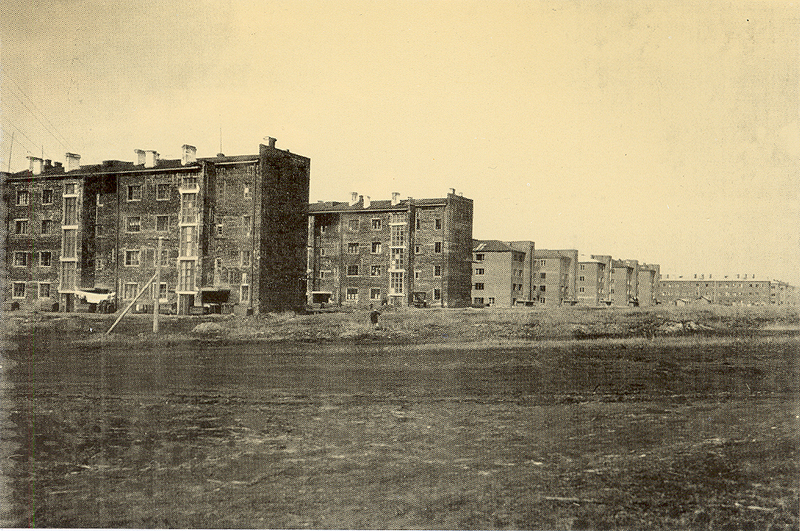
Sotsgorod in the 1930s.

Projects for the construction of the socialist city were developed by Novosibsotsstroy. These projects, in turn, were based on the projects of the architectural team of Ernst May.

In 1931–1933, city blocks were built, which consisted of residential complexes for 500–1000 people, including 4-storey residential buildings, public buildings and institutions for children. The houses were located parallel to each other, forming two rows, between which greened streets should have been created.

In 1934, the Metallist Cinema was built in the city block No. 25, it became the first sound cinema of Novosibirsk.

== Gallery ==
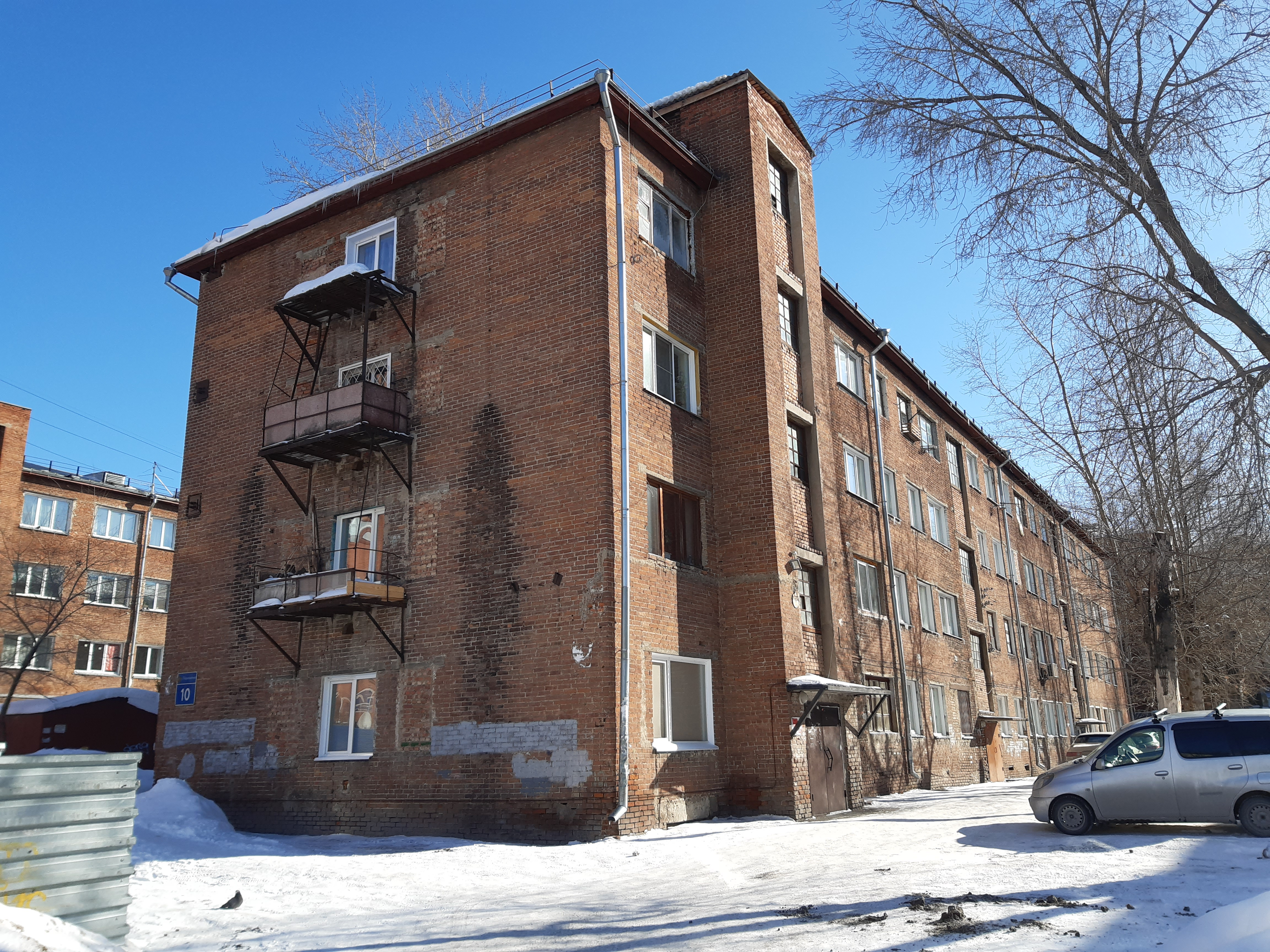

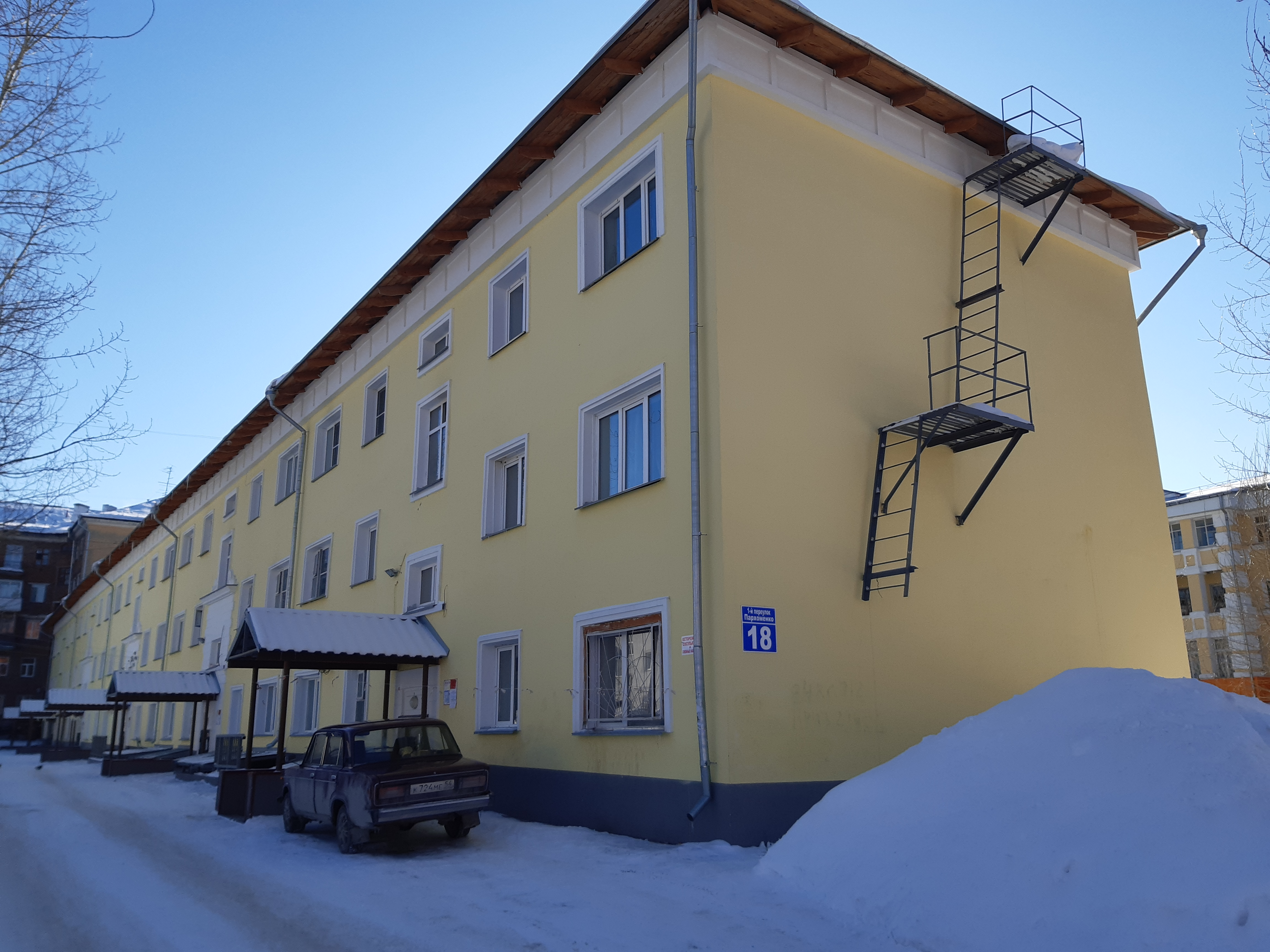

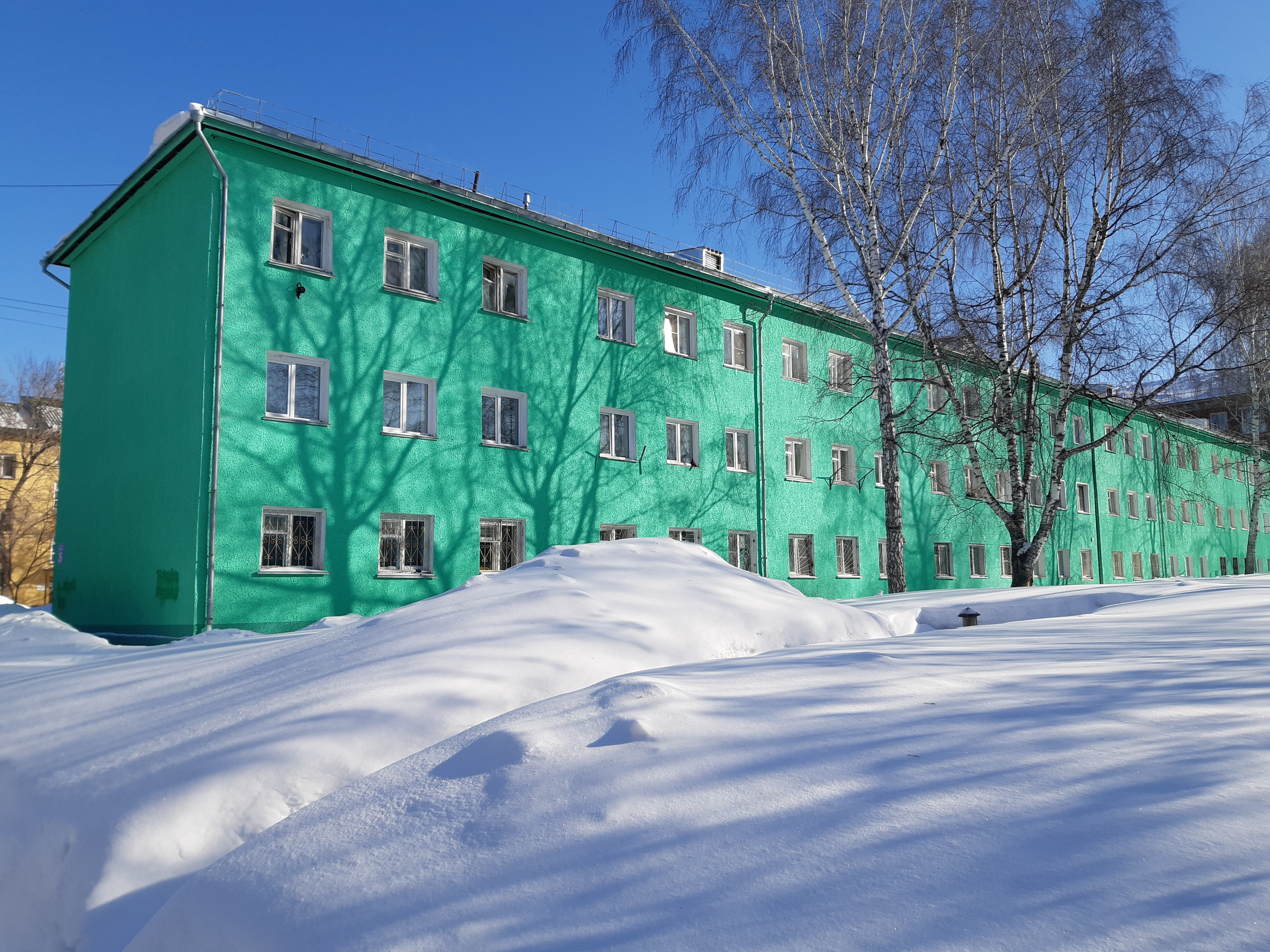

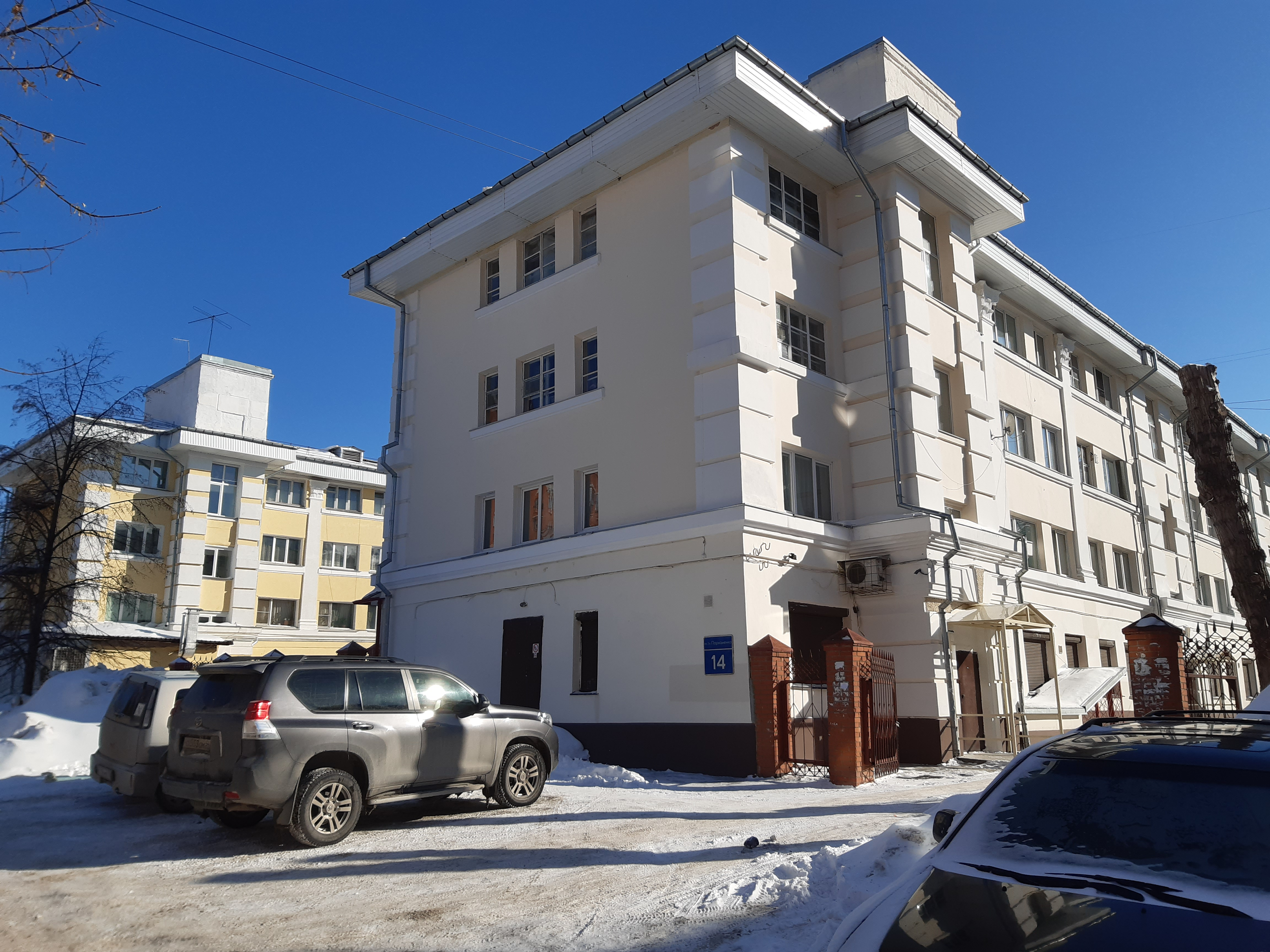
