= Deputatskaya Street, Novosibirsk =

Street in Novosibirsk, Russia

Deputatskaya Street
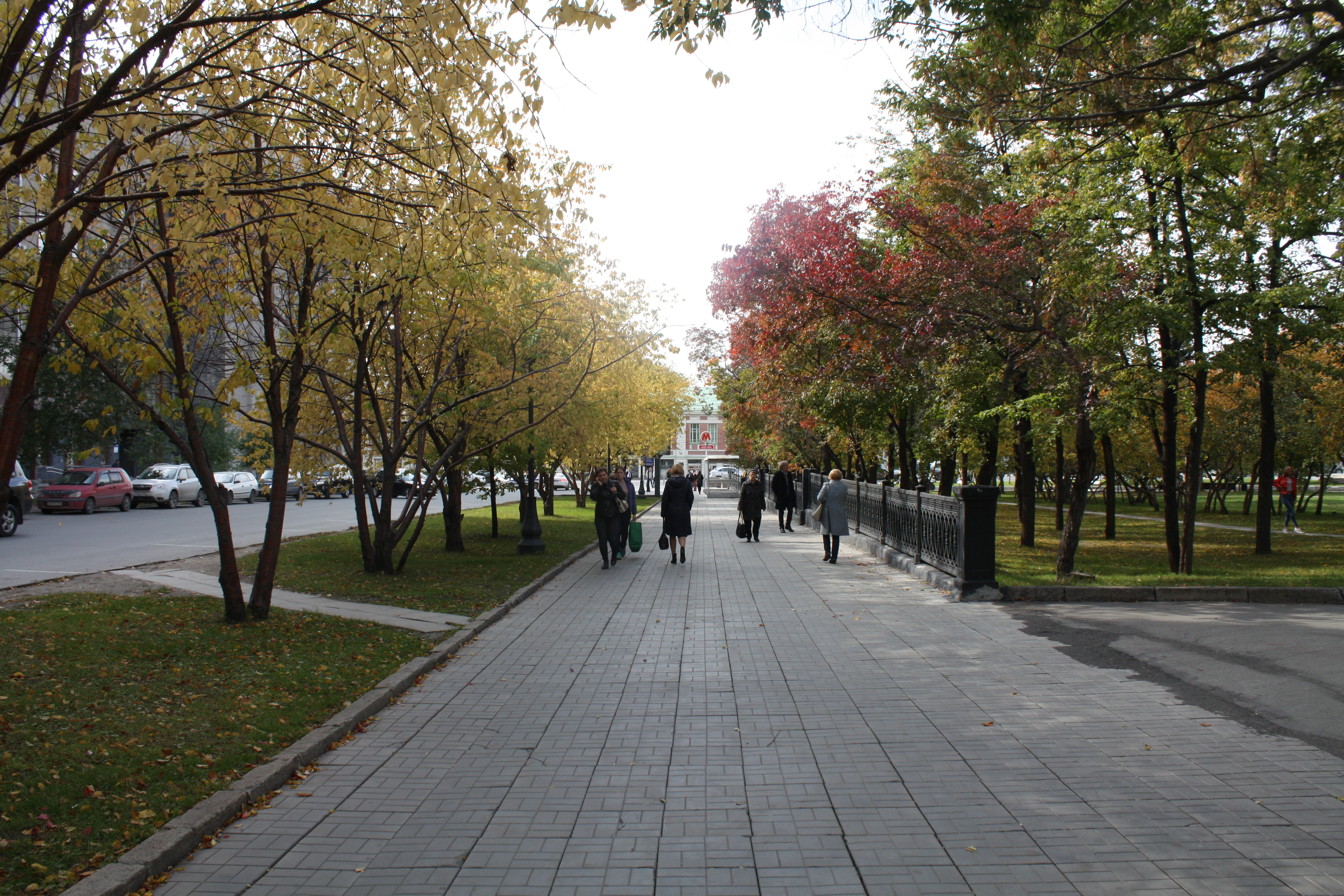
- Native name: Депутатская улица (Russian)
- Location: Novosibirsk; Russia

Deputatskaya Street (Russian: Депутатская улица) is a street in Zheleznodorozhny and Tsentralny districts of Novosibirsk, Russia. It consists of two fragments. The first fragment crosses Street of Revolution and forms a T-intersection with Uritsky Street. The second fragment starts from a T-shaped intersection with Krasny Avenue, crosses Kamenskaya Street and forms a T-intersection with Shamshin Family Street.

== Structures ==
- Istomin House is a two-story building built in 1905.
- Prombank is a building built in 1927. The building was later reconstructed. It is occupied by Novosibirsk City Hall.
- Red Torch Theatre is a drama theatre, directed by Timofey Kulyabin since 2015.
- Novosibirsk Opera and Ballet Theatre is the largest theatre in Russia. It was built in 1944.

== Companies ==
The head office of the Siberian Grain Corporation is located on the street.

== Gallery ==
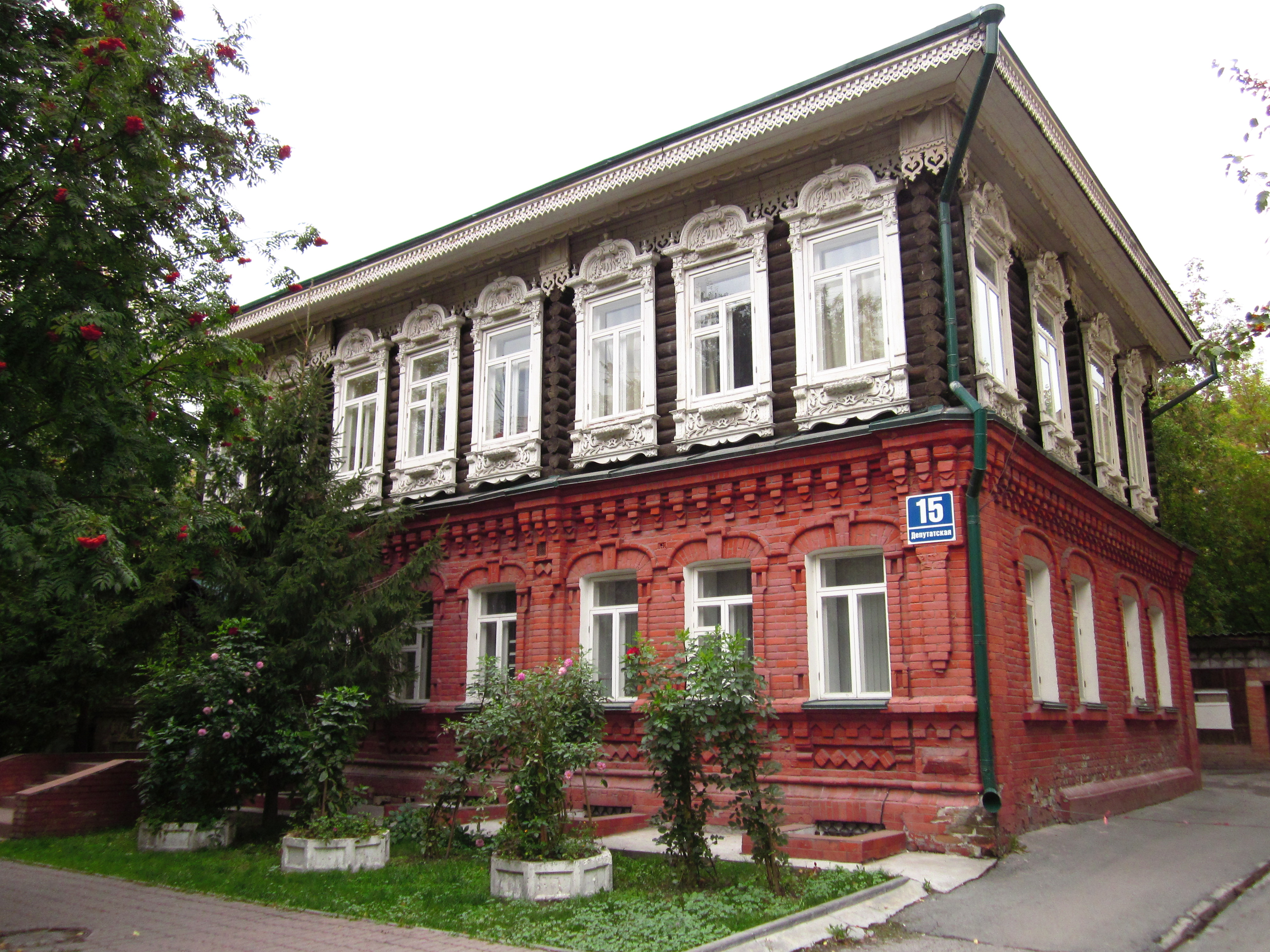
Istomin House

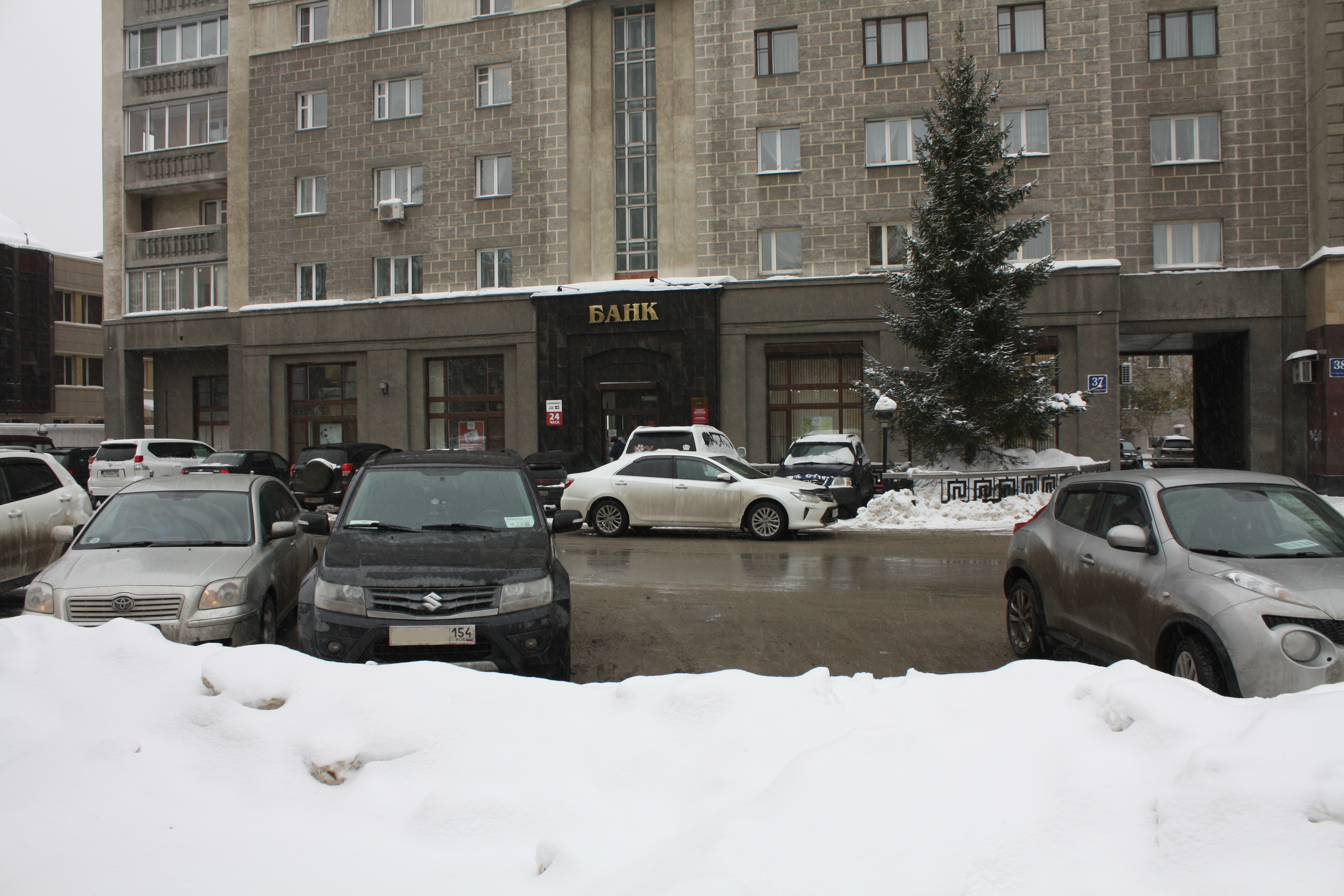

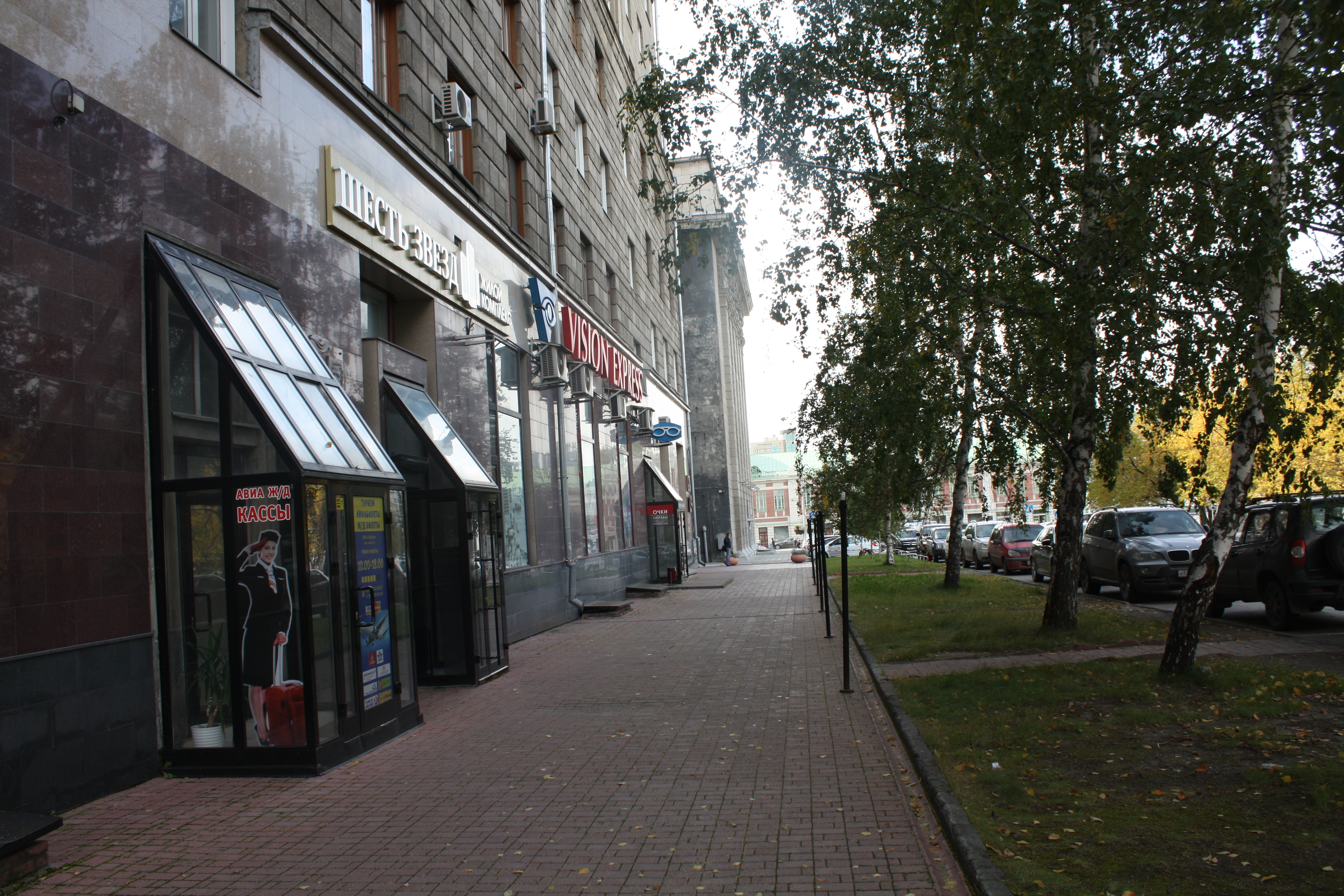

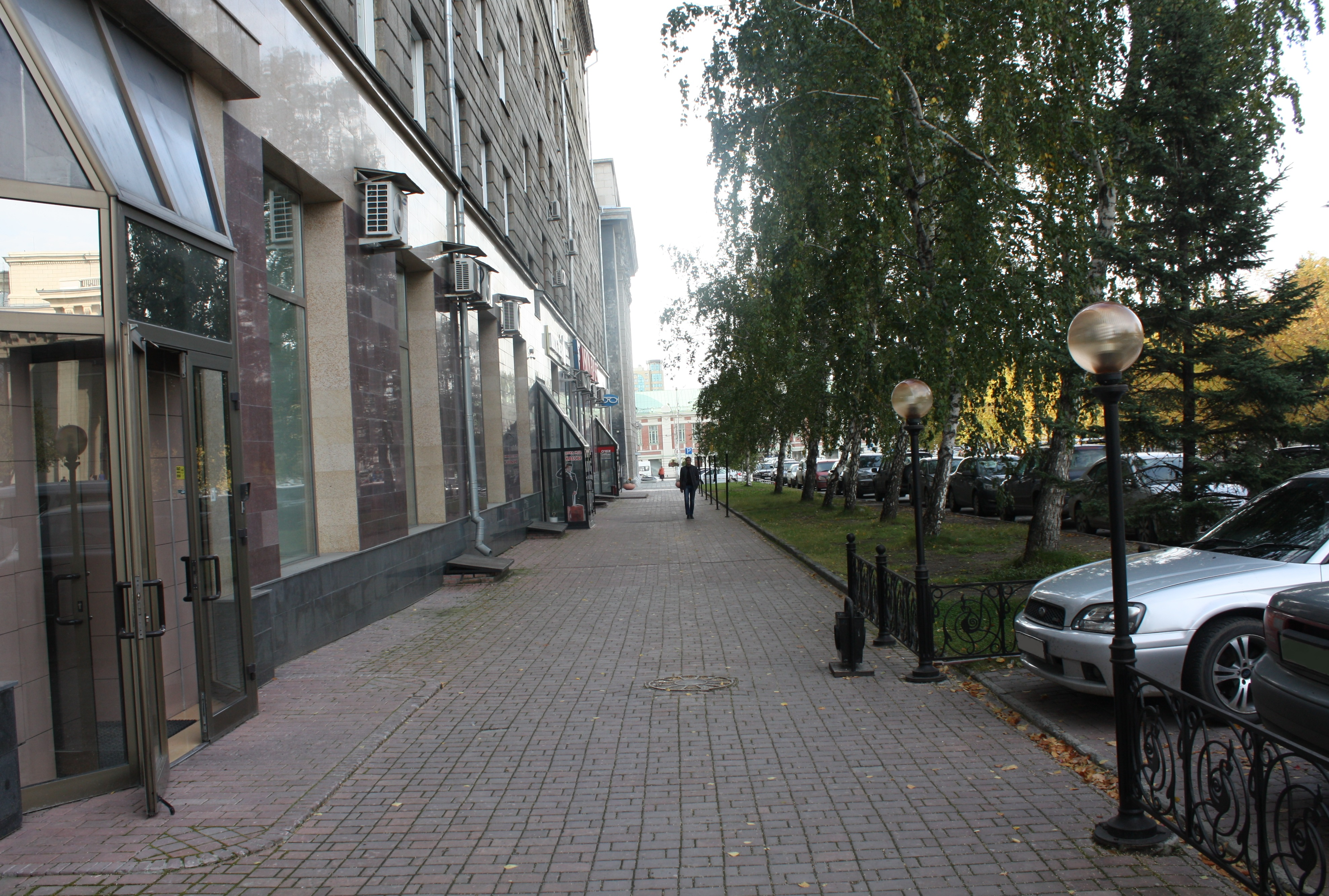

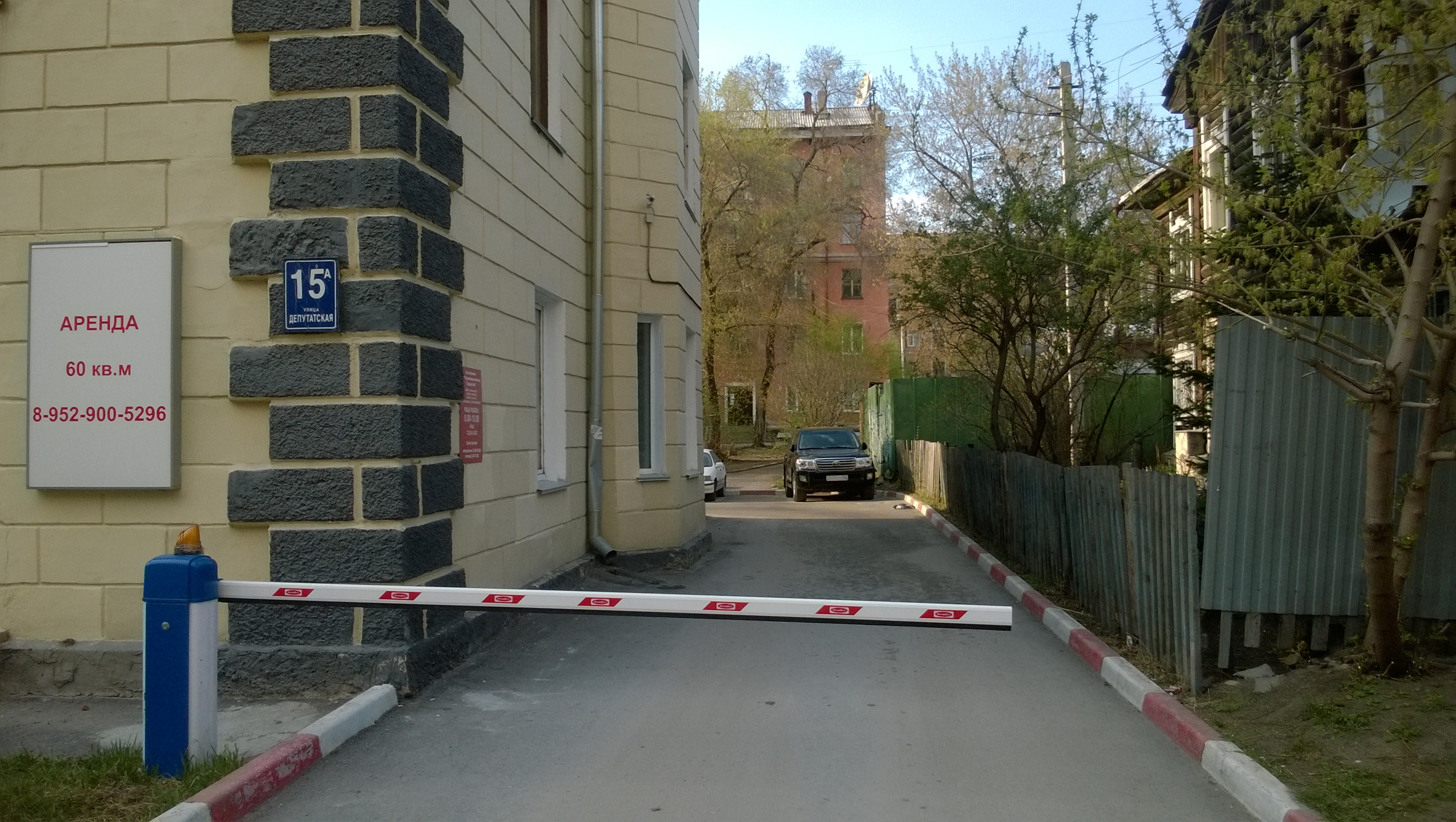

== Transport ==
=== Metro ===
Entrances to Ploshchad Lenina Station are located on the street.

== Notables ==
- Matvey Batrakov (1900–1995) was a Major General, military commissar of the Novosibirsk Oblast, Hero of the Soviet Union. He lived in number 26 from 1966 to 1995.
- Anatoly Ivanov (1928–1999) was a Soviet and Russian writer. He lived in house 38 from 1957 to 1969.
- Anatoly Nikulkov (1922–2001) was a Soviet and Russian writer. He lived in house 38 from 1958 to 2001.
- Anna Pokidchenko (1926–2014) was a Soviet and Russian theater actress. People's Artist of the USSR. She lived in house 38.
