= Potaninskaya Street 10a, Novosibirsk =

Potaninskaya Street 10a
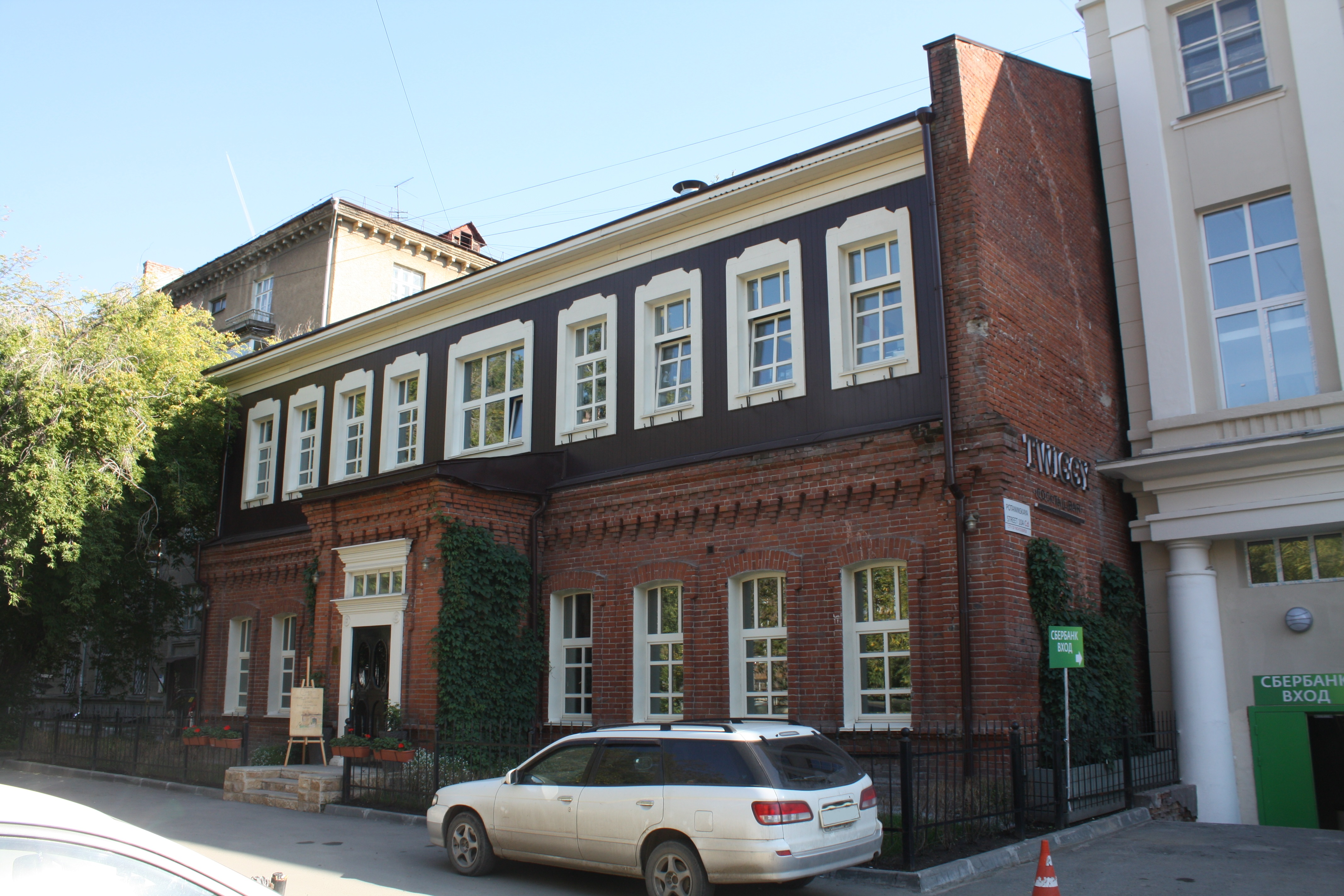
- Interactive map of the Potaninskaya Street 10a area

General information
- Location: Novosibirsk, Russia
- Coordinates: 55°02′01″N 82°55′14″E
- Completed: 1915

Potaninskaya Street 10a (Russian: Потанинская улица, 10а) is a two-story building in Tsentralny District of Novosibirsk, Russia. It was constructed in 1915. The main facade of the house faces Potaninskaya Street. The building is an architectural monument of regional significance.

== History ==
The house was built in 1915.

In 1922, the building was occupied by the editorial office of the Sibirskie Ogni literary and artistic journal.

22 September 2017, the building caught fire.

== Organizations ==
As of September 2017, the building is occupied by three restaurants.

== Gallery ==
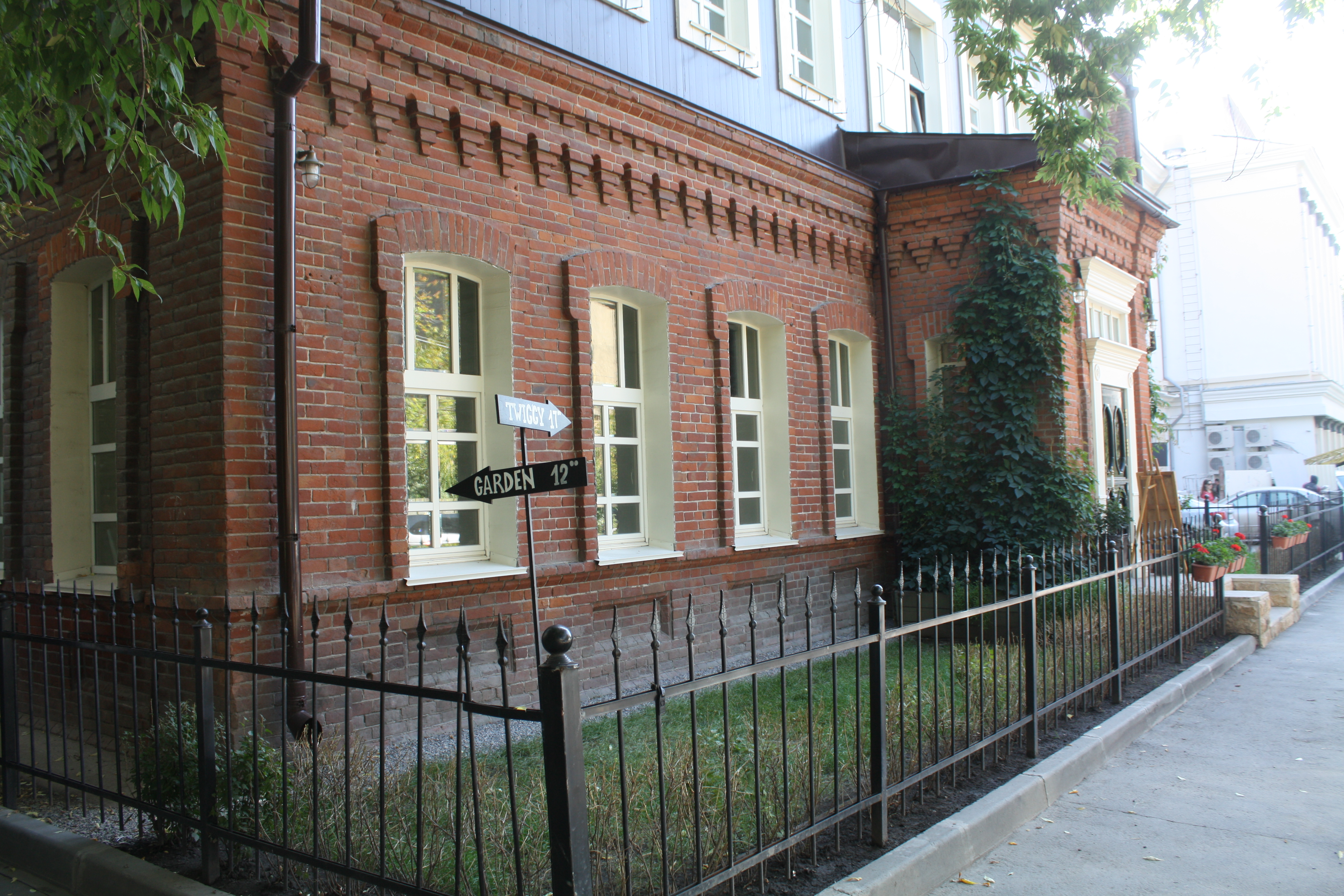
