= Siberian Grain Corporation =

Russian Company

- Founded: 1991
- Founder: Dmitry Tereshkov
- Headquarters: Novosibirsk, Russia

Siberian Grain Corporation is a company headquartered in Novosibirsk, Russia. It was founded in 1991 by Dmitry Tereshkov. The company includes a number of enterprises operating in several regions of Russia.

== History ==
The company was founded in 1991 by Dmitry Tereshkov and was originally called the Siberian Contract Corporation (SCC), it provided intermediary services, the company took orders, then purchased the necessary raw materials for the implementation of orders, entered into contracts with enterprises for the processing of raw materials, after which it sold finished products.

In 1994, the company began to develop the grain business. At that time, the system of state financing of rural industry was on the verge of collapse, bread factories experienced great difficulties due to a lack of grain. Tereshkov made the following proposal to the Government of the Novosibirsk Oblast: SCC takes a bank loan and buys 70,000 tons of grain, but the loan rate should be half compensated by the regional government. Regional authorities agreed with the proposal. The plants manufactured products but were unable to pay the debt, after which Tereshkov took another loan and bought two factories that owed him (two enterprises belonging to the Voskhod Association).

In 1997, the Siberian Contract Corporation was renamed into the Siberian Grain Corporation. In the same year Tereshkov and Boris Serebryany (founder of the Fiera Foods from Canada) created the Voskhod-Beiker Company in Novosibirsk for the production of parbaked bread.

In the late 1990s, Tereshkov bought three factories in Ufa and entered the Ural market.

In 2005, in Mytishchi near Moscow, the company opened a second enterprise producing parbaked bread.

In 2006, Voskhod-Beiker was renamed Bon Ape.

== Activities ==
The enterprises of the Siberian Grain Corporation manufactured bakery products, frozen semi-finished products and cakes. During the production process, part-bake and stress-free baking methods are used. In total, the company produces more than 500 types of products.

== Controlled enterprises ==
=== Novosibirsk and Novosibirsk Oblast ===
- Voskhod is a bakery association founded in 1929;
- Rusich is a bread and confectionery combine.
- Voskhod-Beiker
- Novosibirsk Association of Bakery Enterprises
- Kupinsky Elevator is an enterprise located in Kupino.

=== Ufa ===
- Voskhod Ufa Grain Association

=== Moscow Oblast ===
- Voskhod-Stolitsa is an enterprise located in Mytishchi.

== Brands ==
=== Voskhod ===
Siberian Grain Corporation was one of the first in Russia to brand its products. The bread began to be sold in packages under the brand name Voskhod.

=== BonApe ===
BonApe is a chain of bakeries. As of 2015, it included 14 bakeries in Novosibirsk, 8 in Saint Petersburg, 5 in Moscow, as well as in Krasnoyarsk, Chelyabinsk, Cheboksary and Ust-Kamenogorsk (Kazakhstan).

According to SPARK, Voskhod Association owns 100% of Voskhod-Center, which sells a franchise for the development of the BonApe chain throughout Russia. In 2015, BonApe began working in the street pavilions of Novosibirsk, but in 2016 Central Okrug of Novosibirsk attempted to shut down company's pavilions.

In Novosibirsk in 2018, according to 2GIS, there was only one Bonape Store. It was located on Gogol Street.
