= Tsentralny District, Novosibirsk =

Tsentralny District
- District
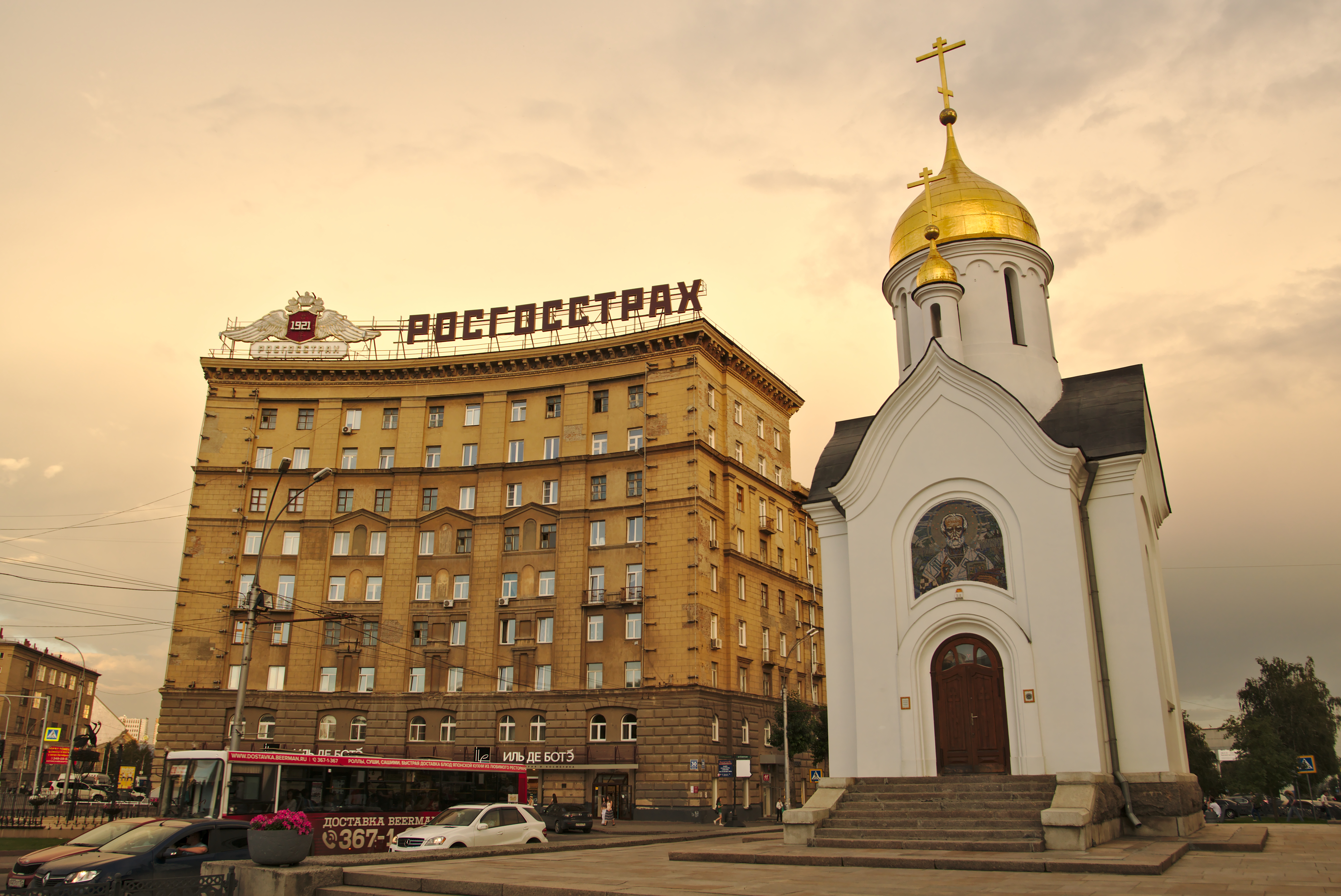
- Location of Tsentrlny City District
- Coordinates: 55°1′59.99″N 82°55′0.01″E
- Country: Russia
- Federal subject: Novosibirsk
- Established: 1940

Area
  - Total: 6.4 km^{2} (2.5 sq mi)

Tsentralny District (Russian: Центральный район) is an administrative district (raion) of Central Okrug, one of the 10 raions of Novosibirsk, Russia. The area of the district is 6.4 km^{2} (2.5 sq mi). Population: 78 794 (2017).

== History ==
Tsentralny City District was established in 1940.

== Streets ==
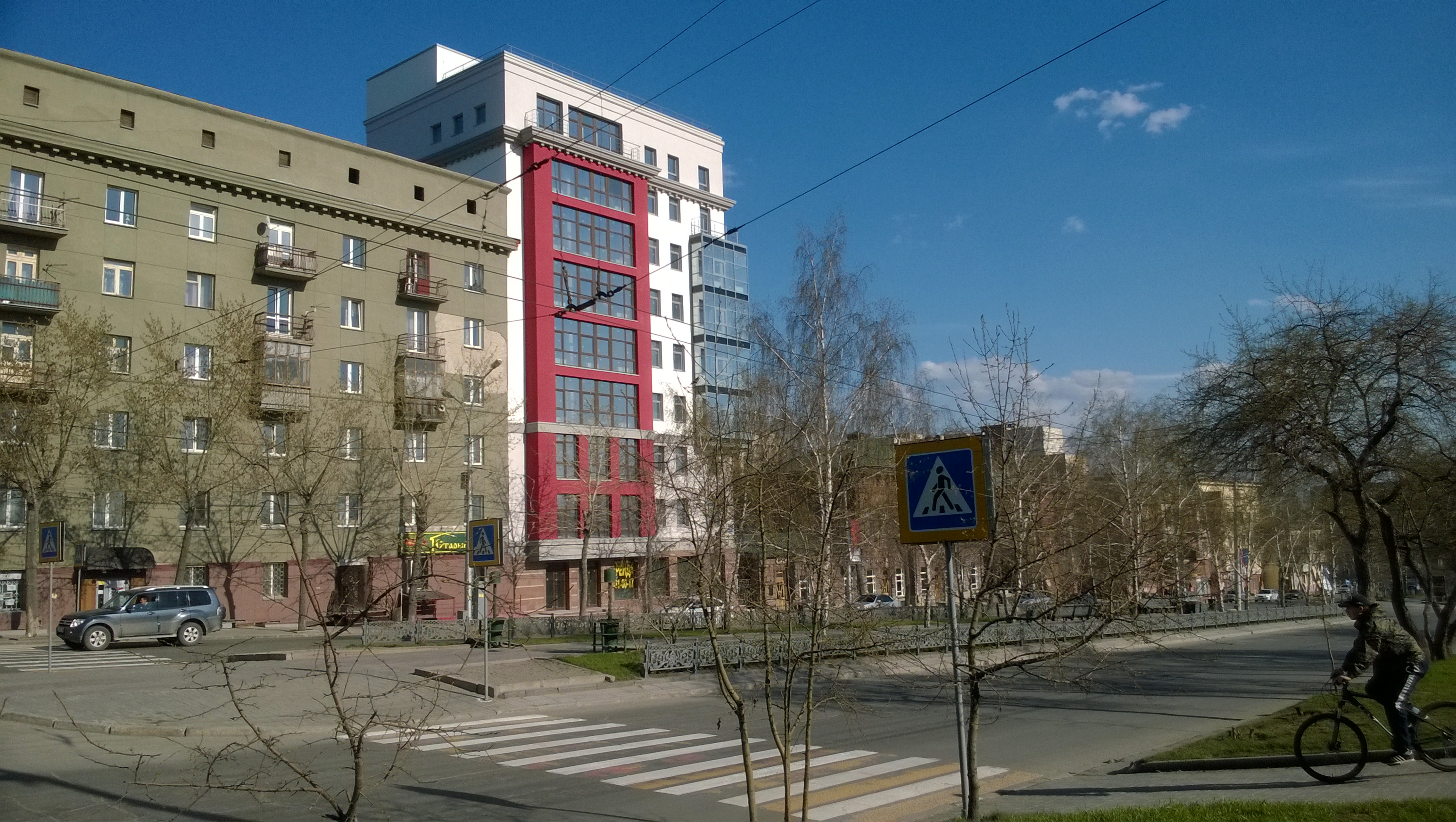
Krasny Avenue

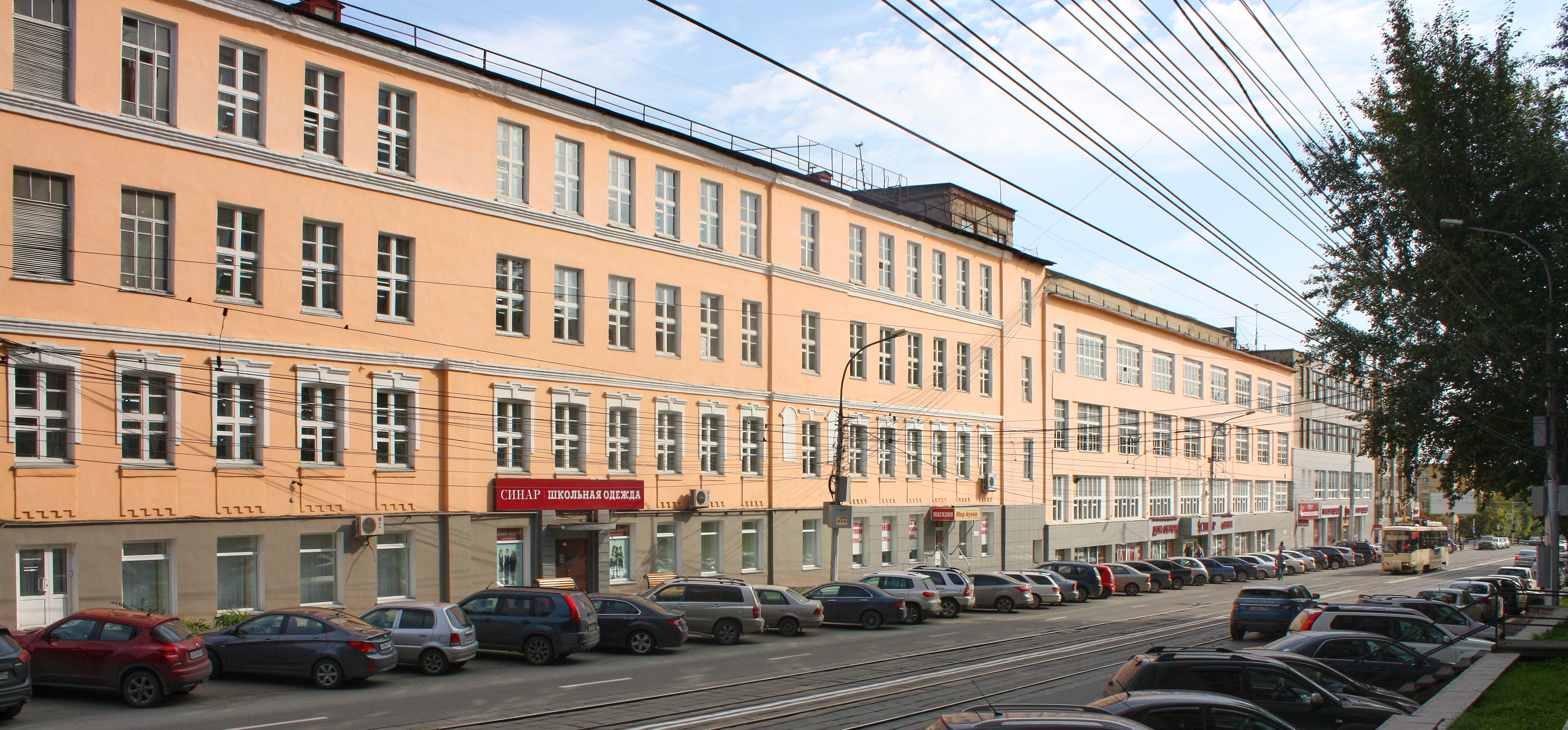
Serebrennikovskaya Street

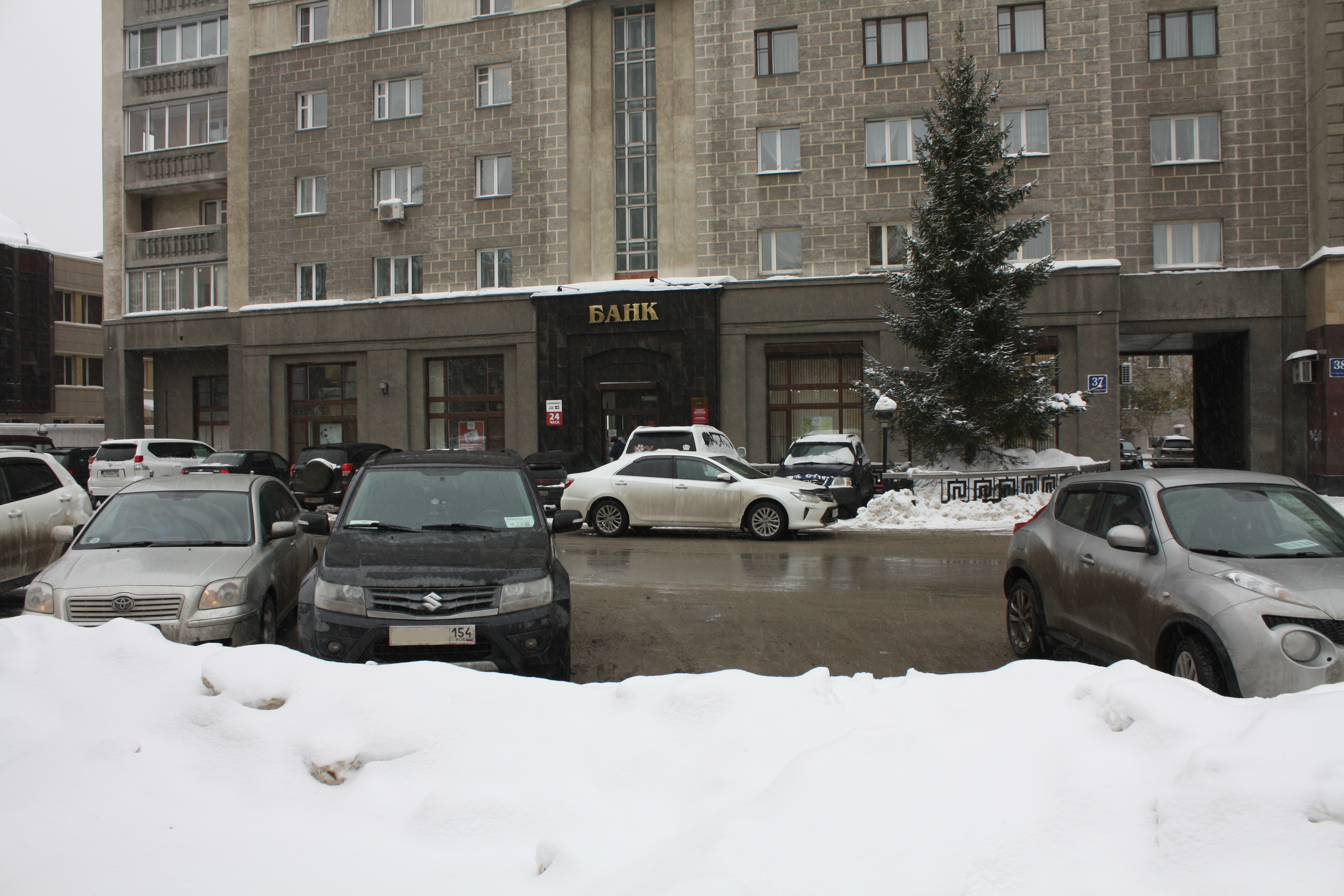
Deputatskaya Street

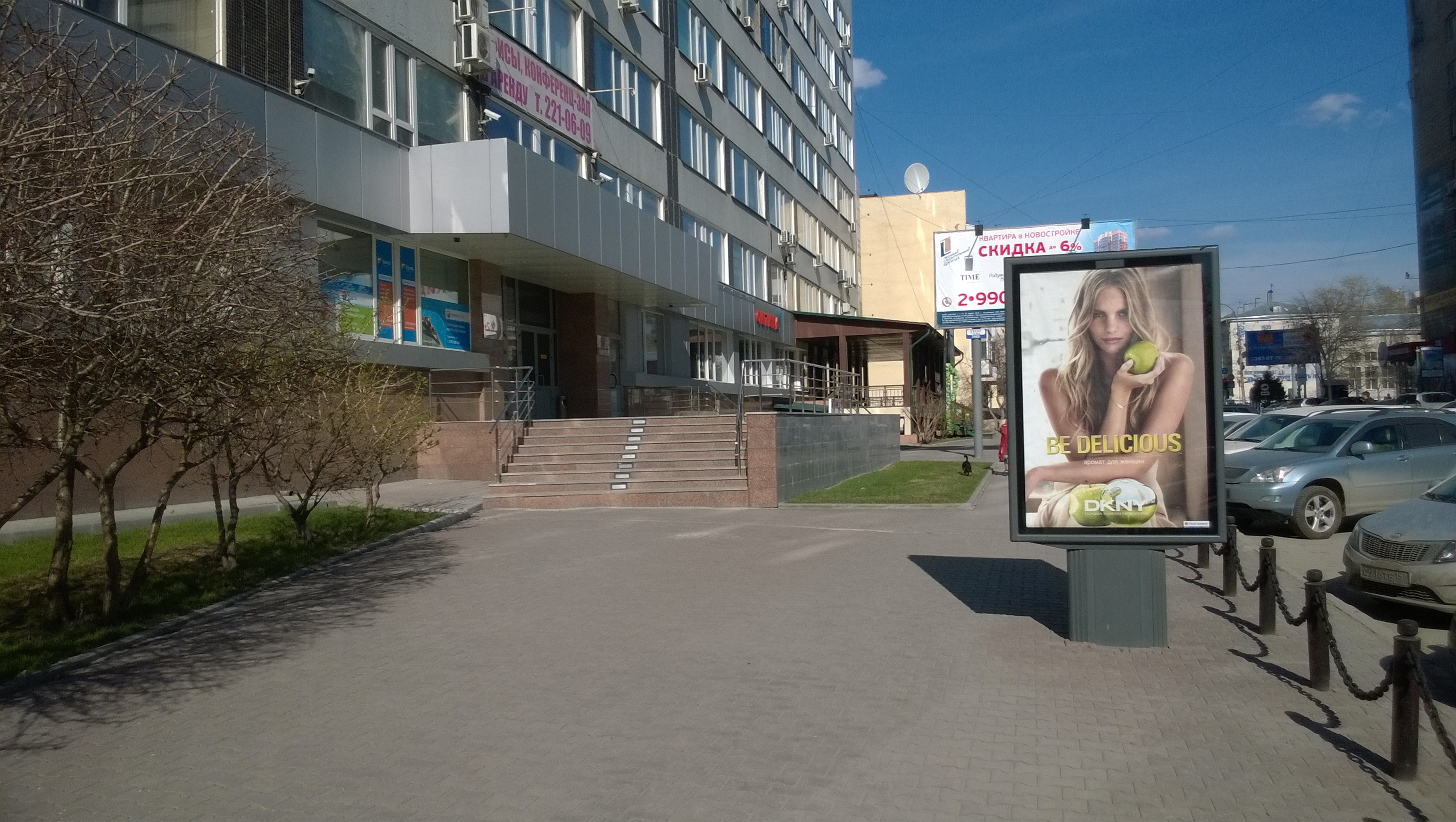
Frunze Street

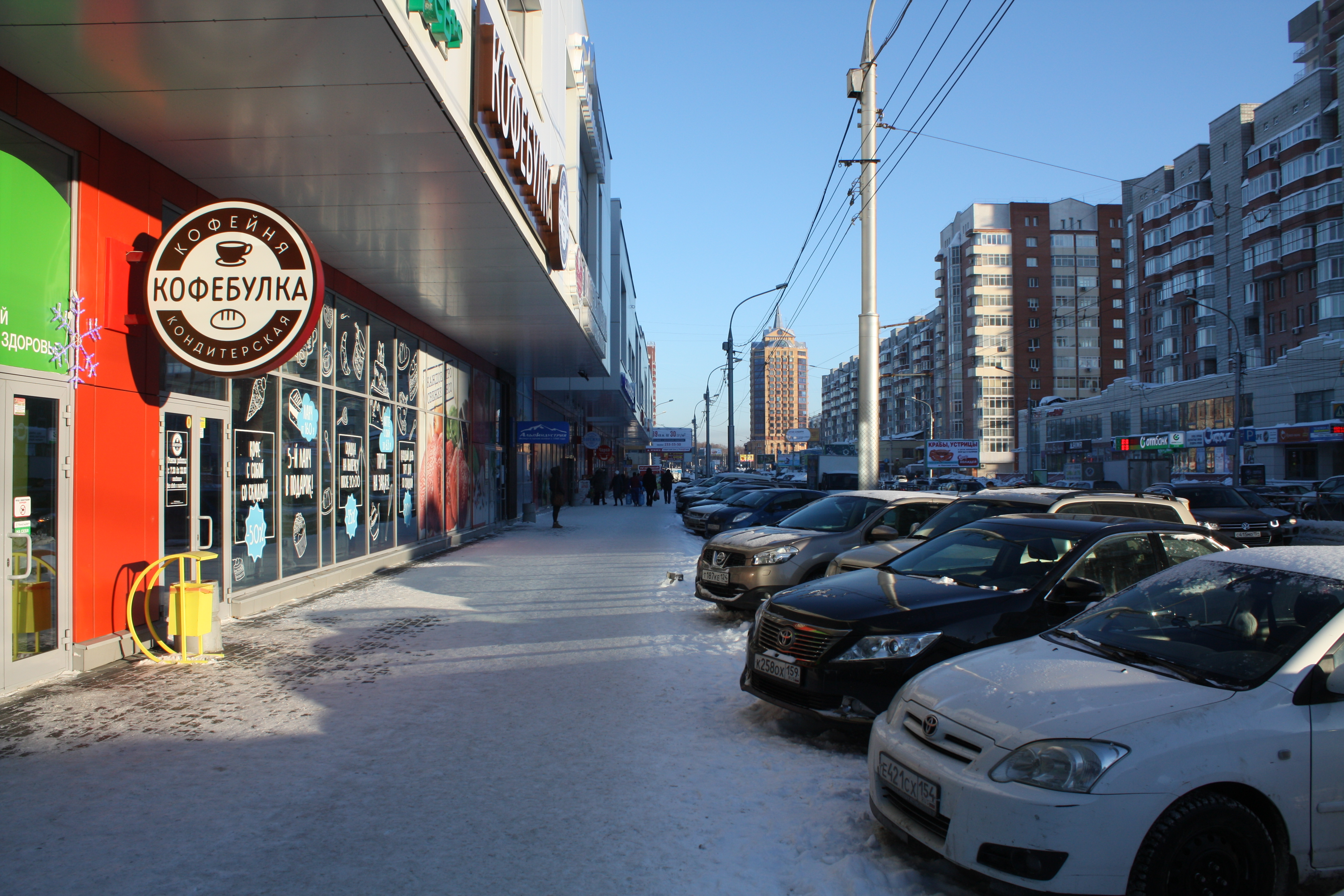
Gogol Street

== Architecture ==
=== Imperial Russia ===
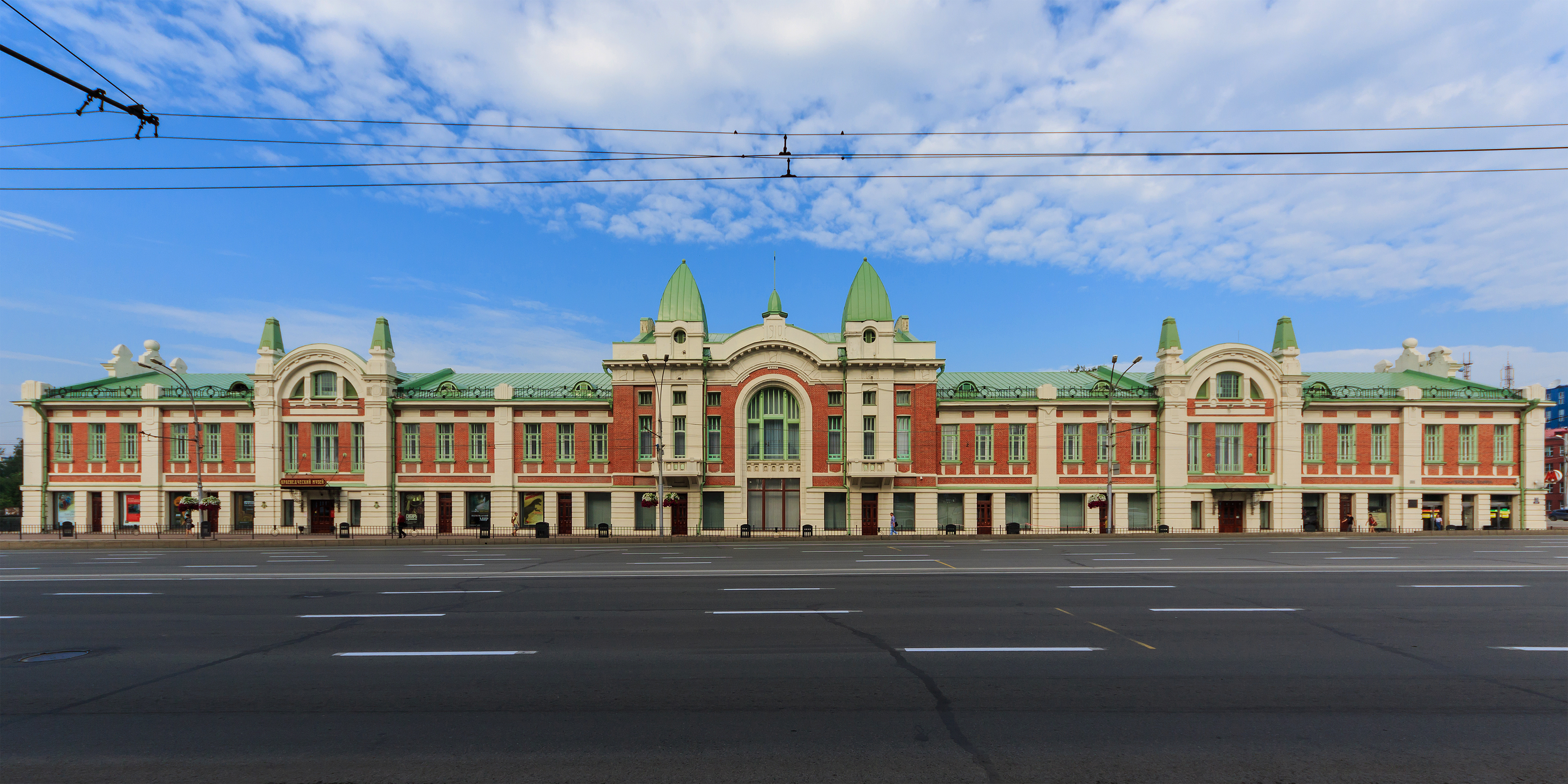
City Trade House

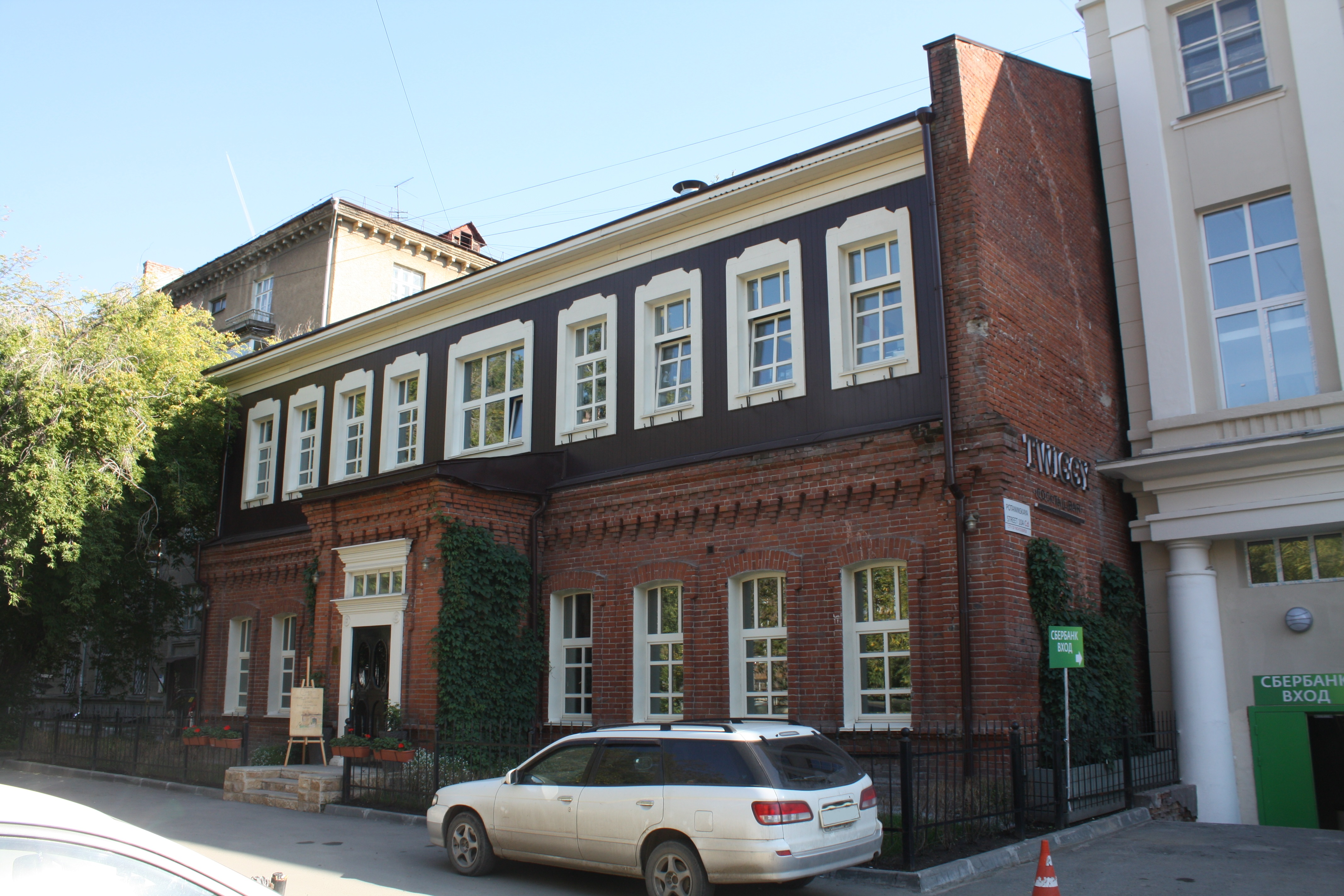

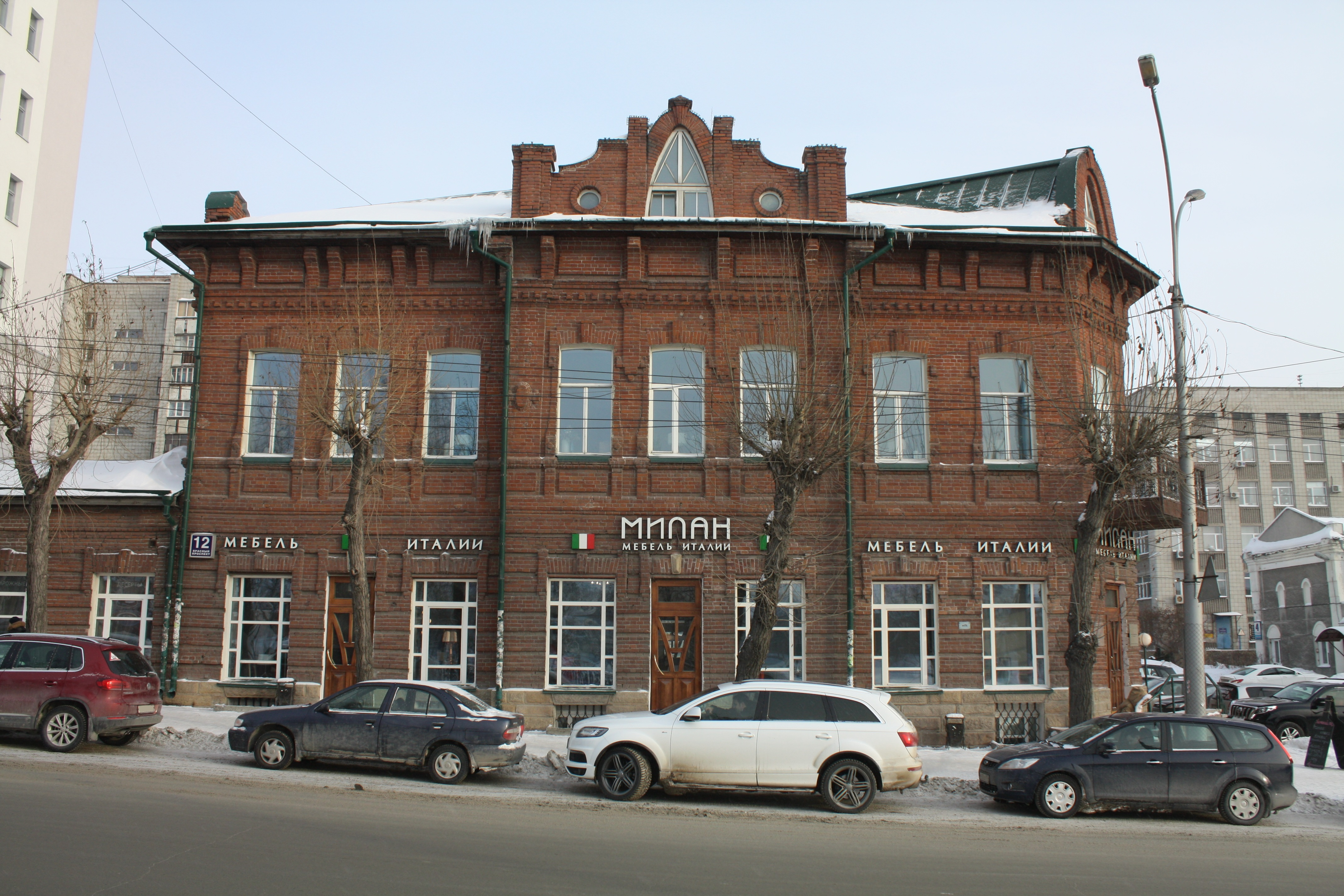

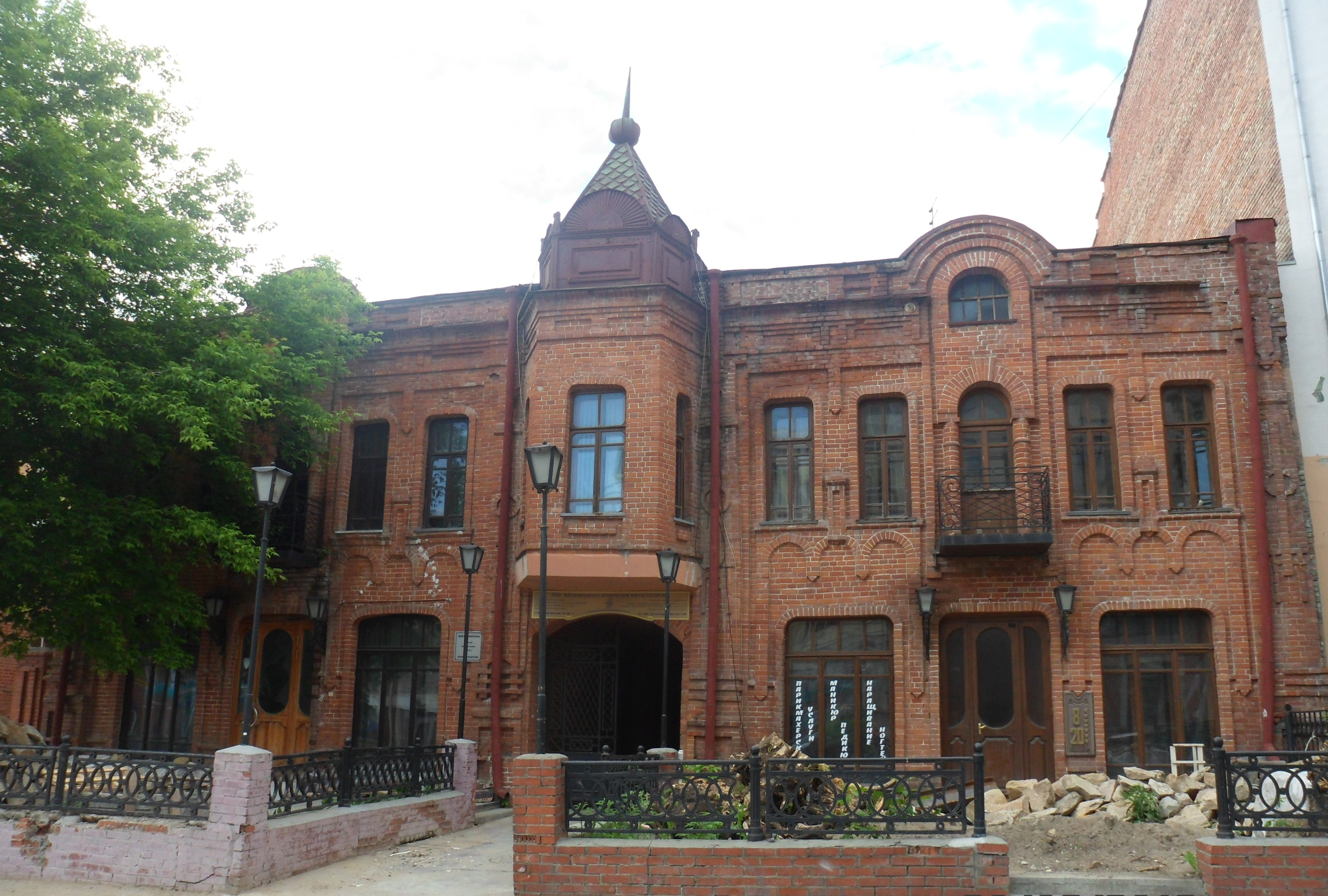
Zedain House

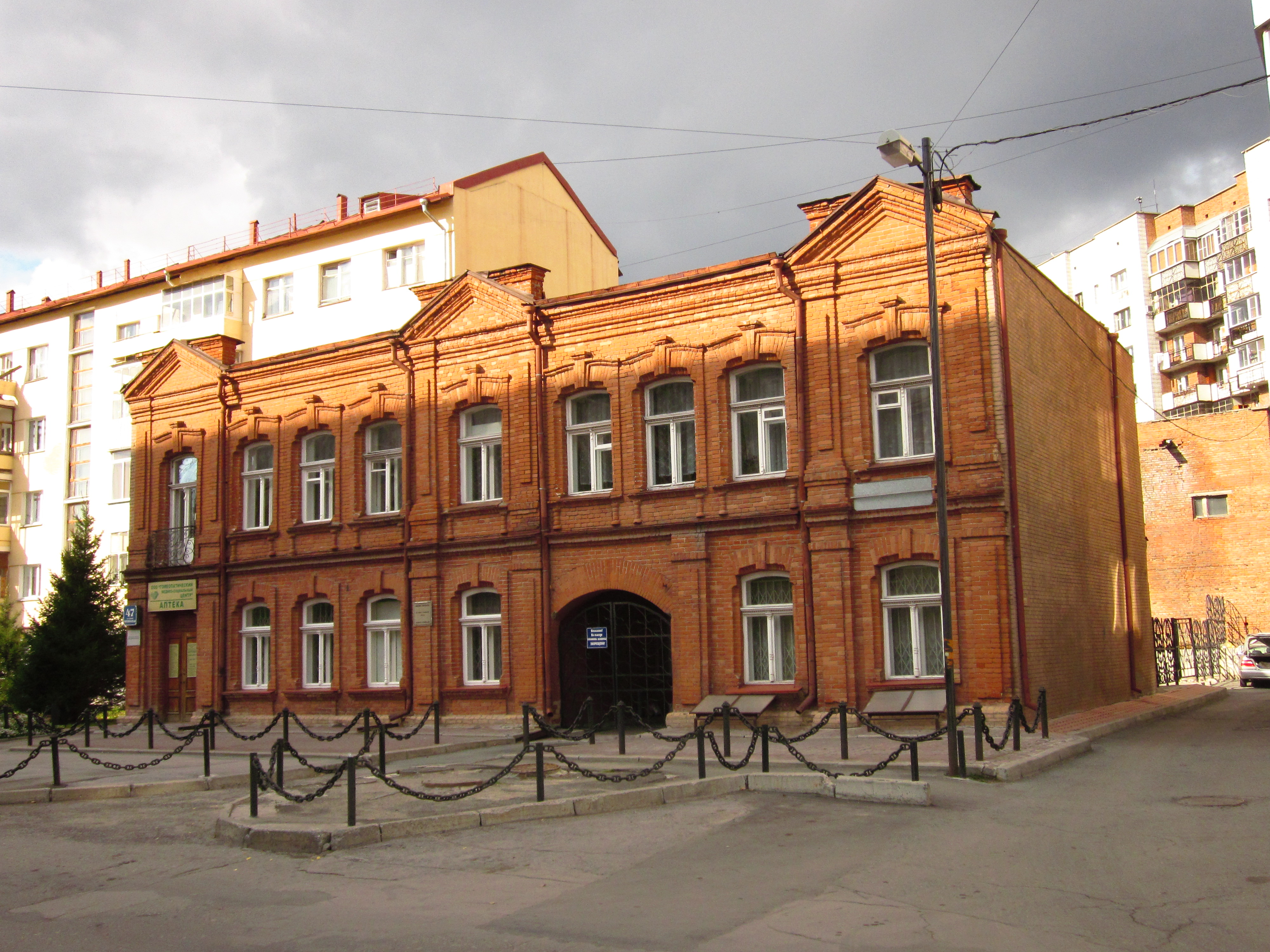

=== Soviet architecture ===
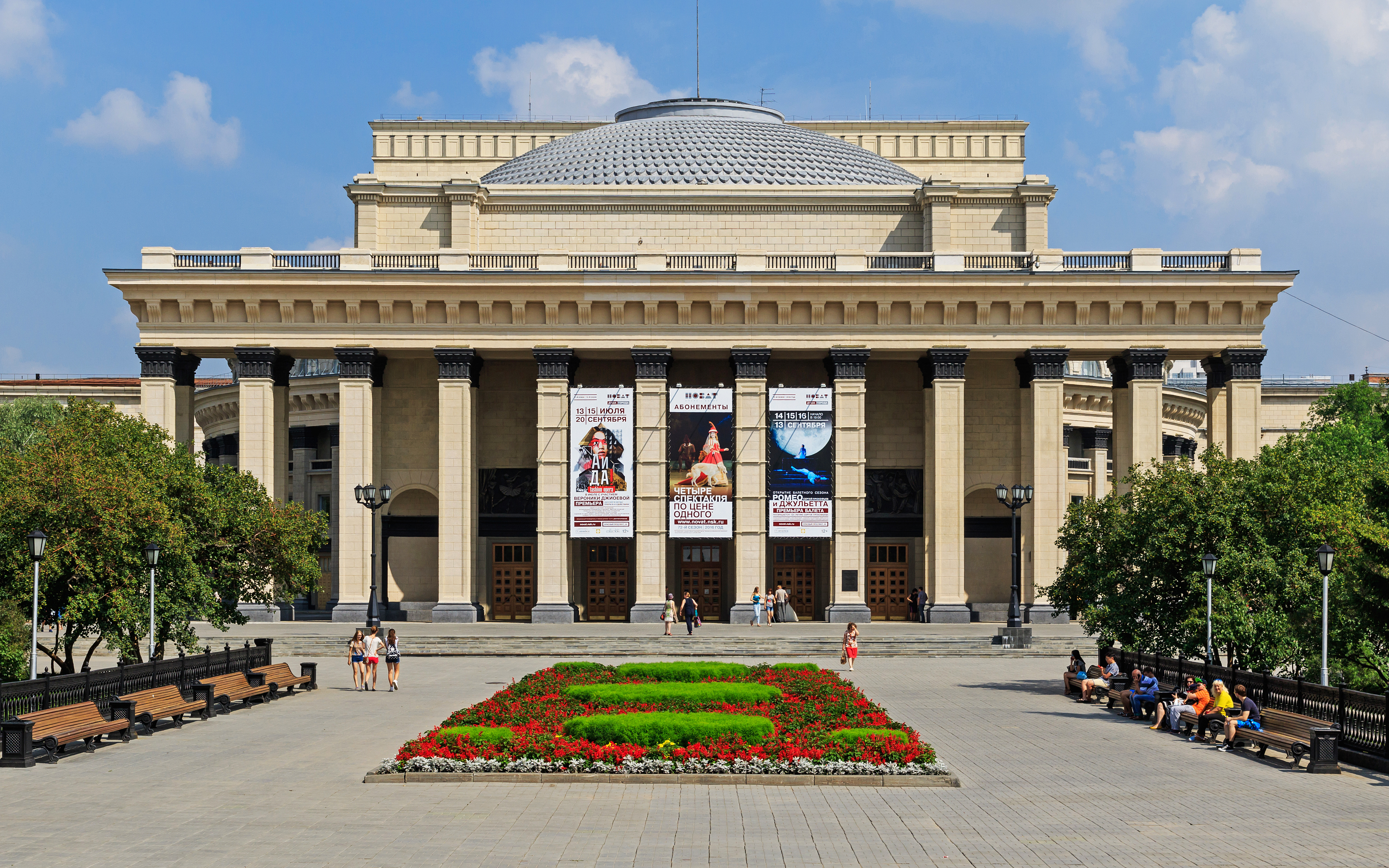
Novosibirsk Opera and Ballet Theatre

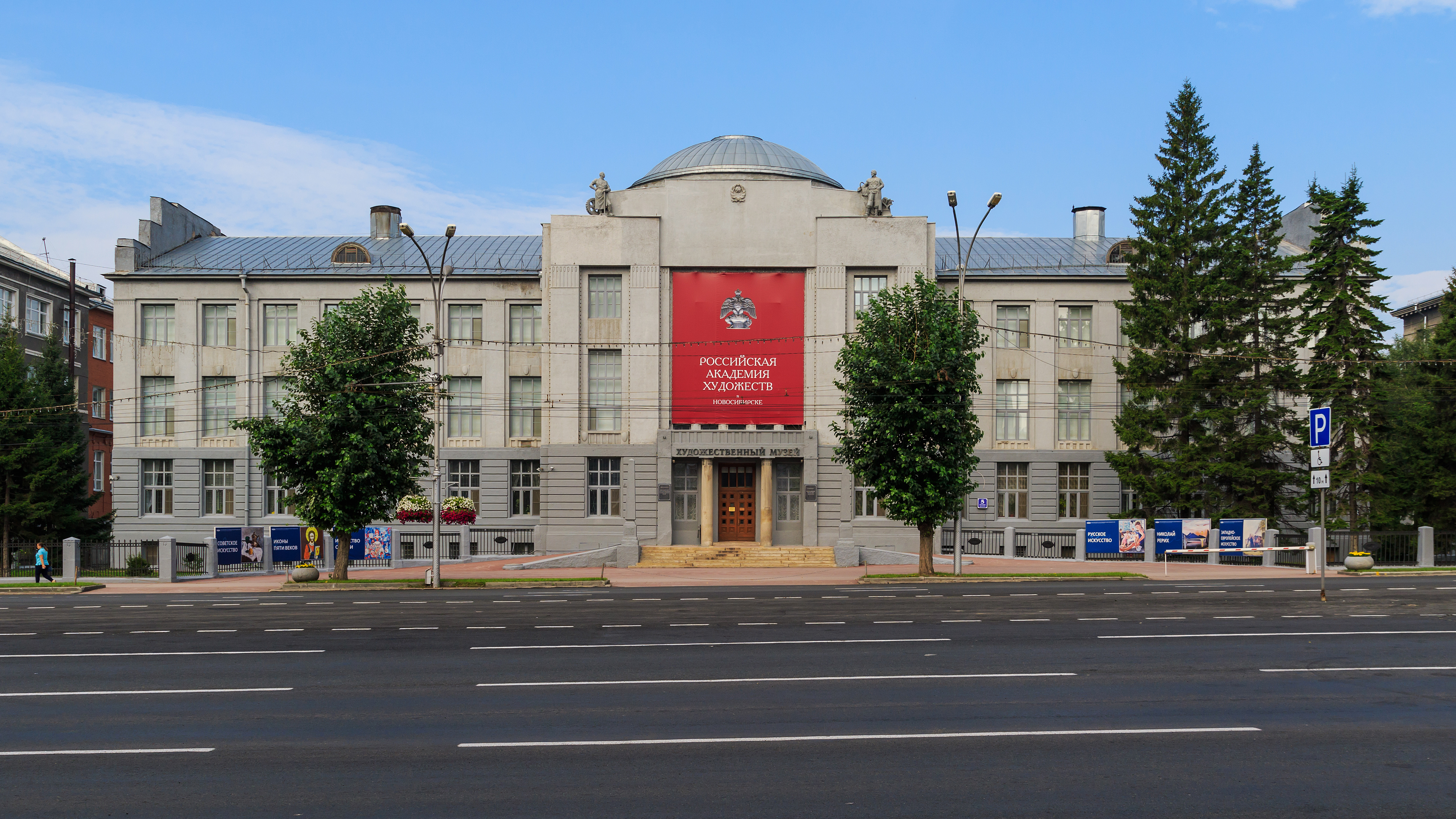
Novosibirsk State Art Museum

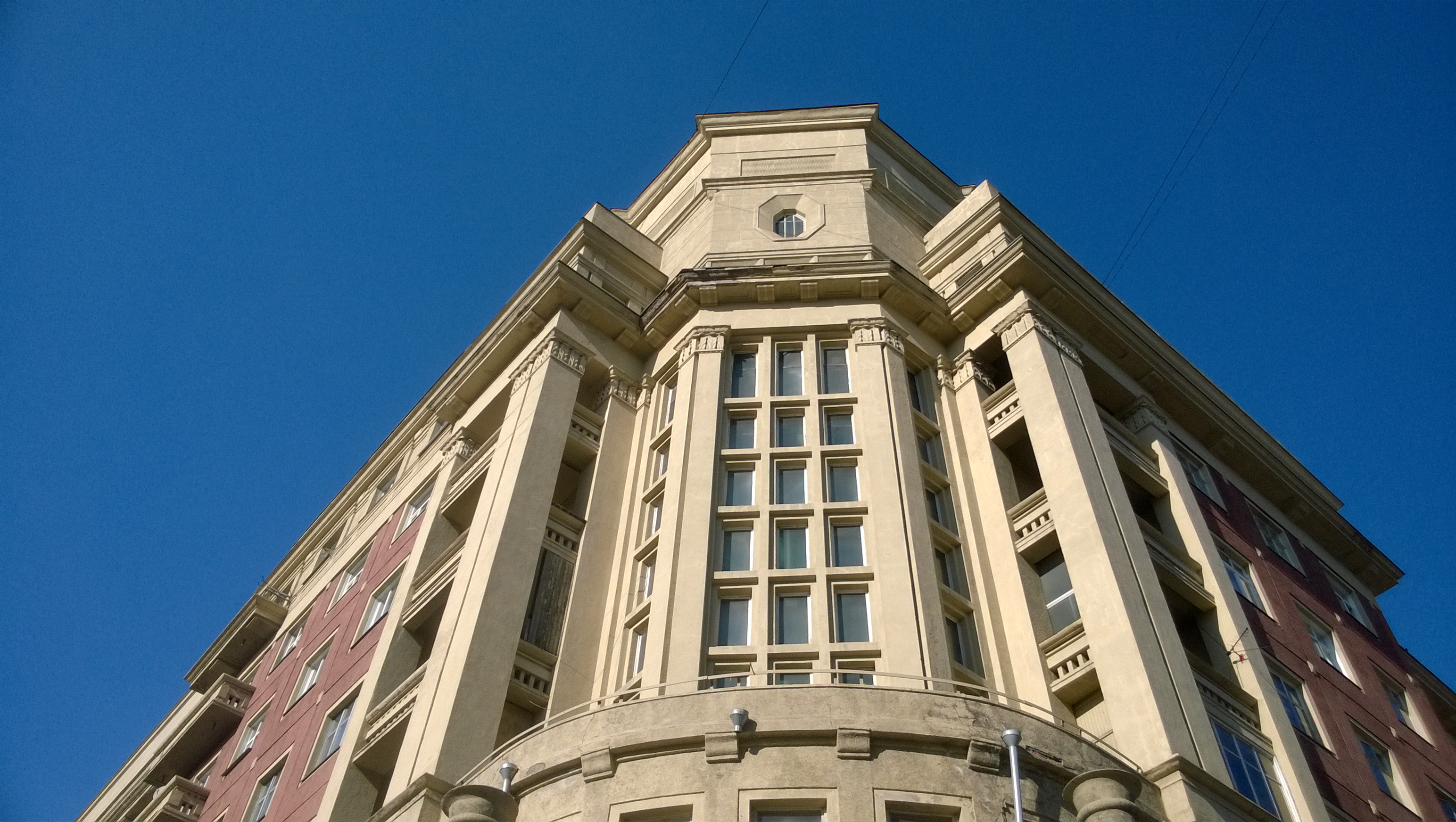
100-Flat Building

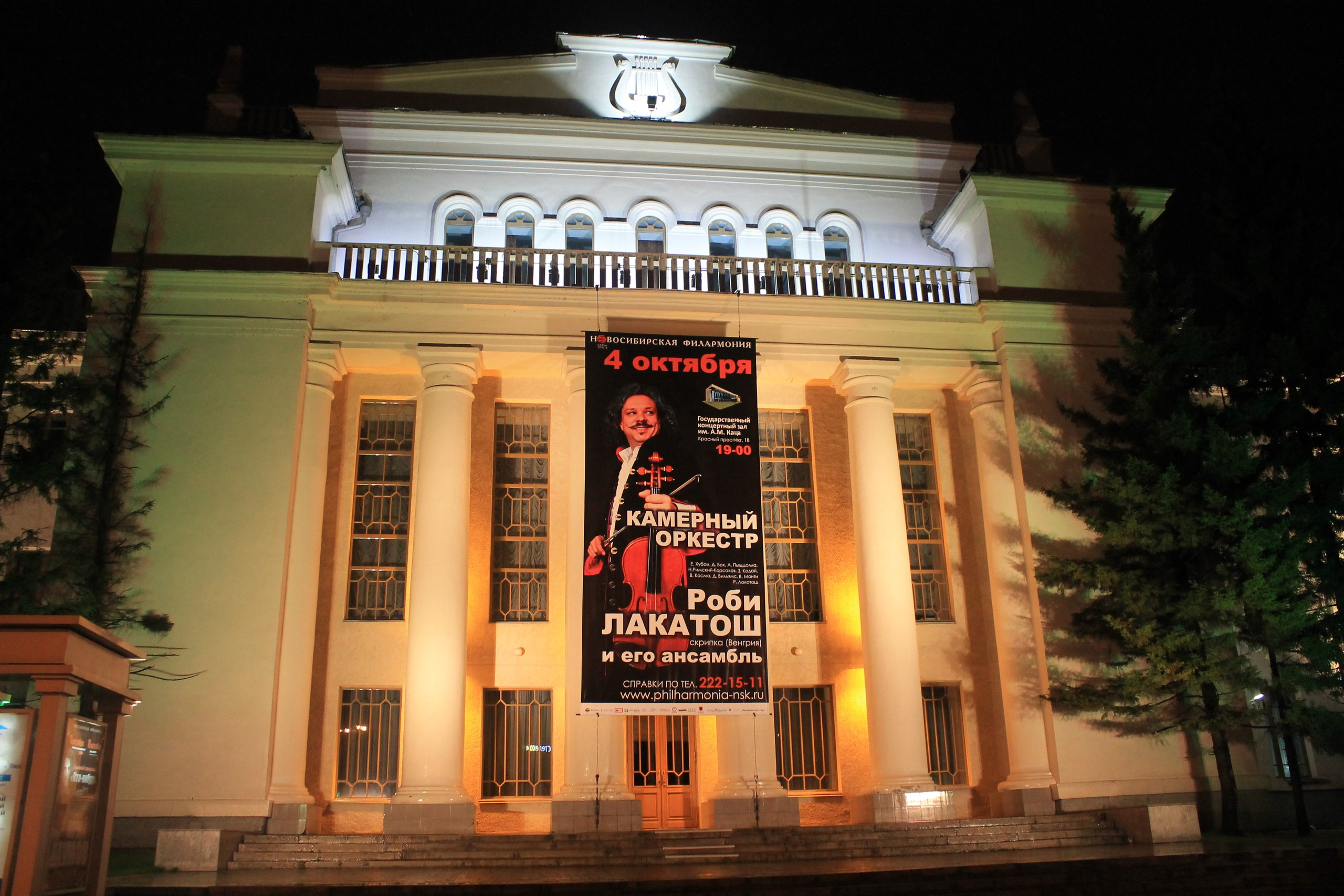
Lenin House

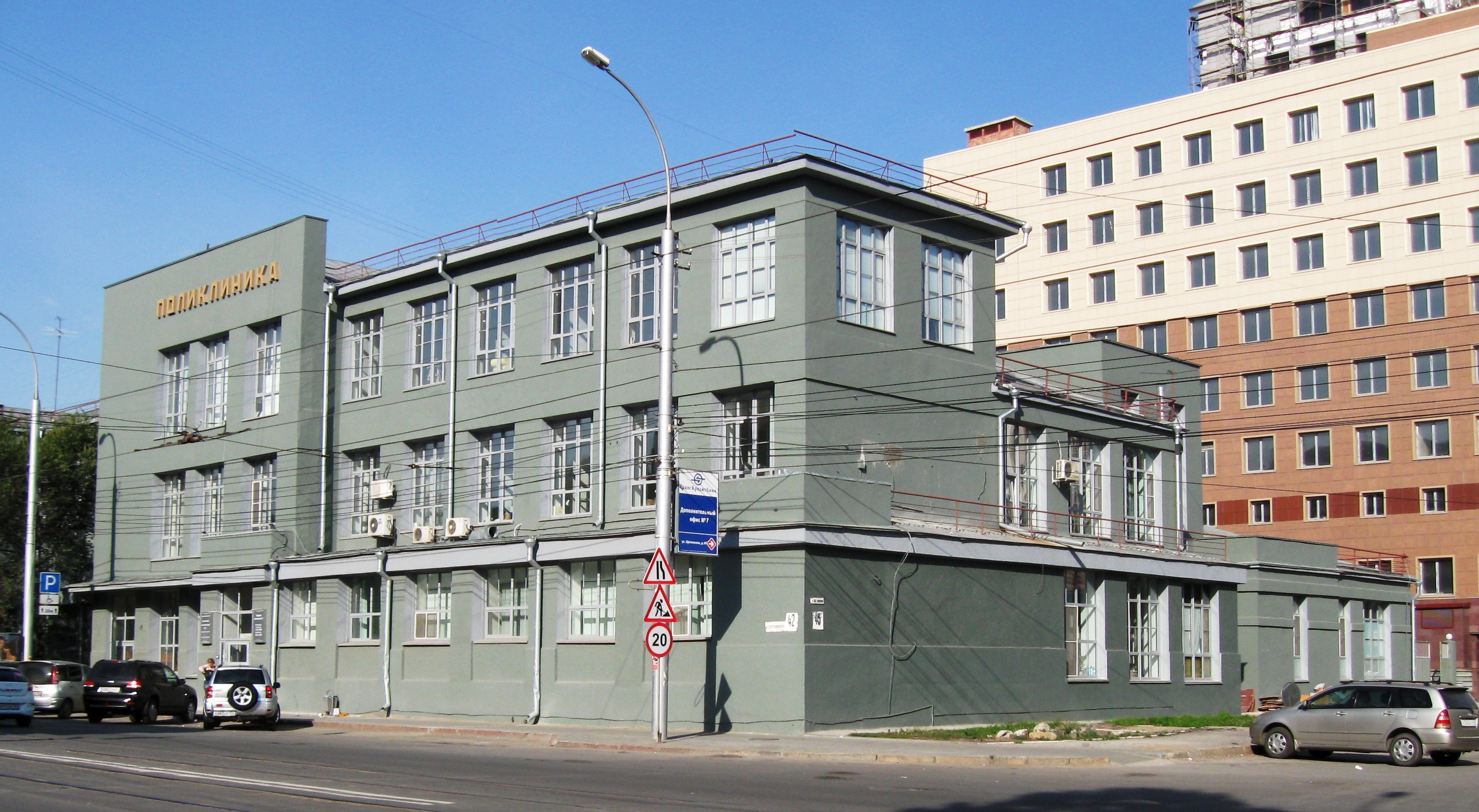
Polyclinic No. 1

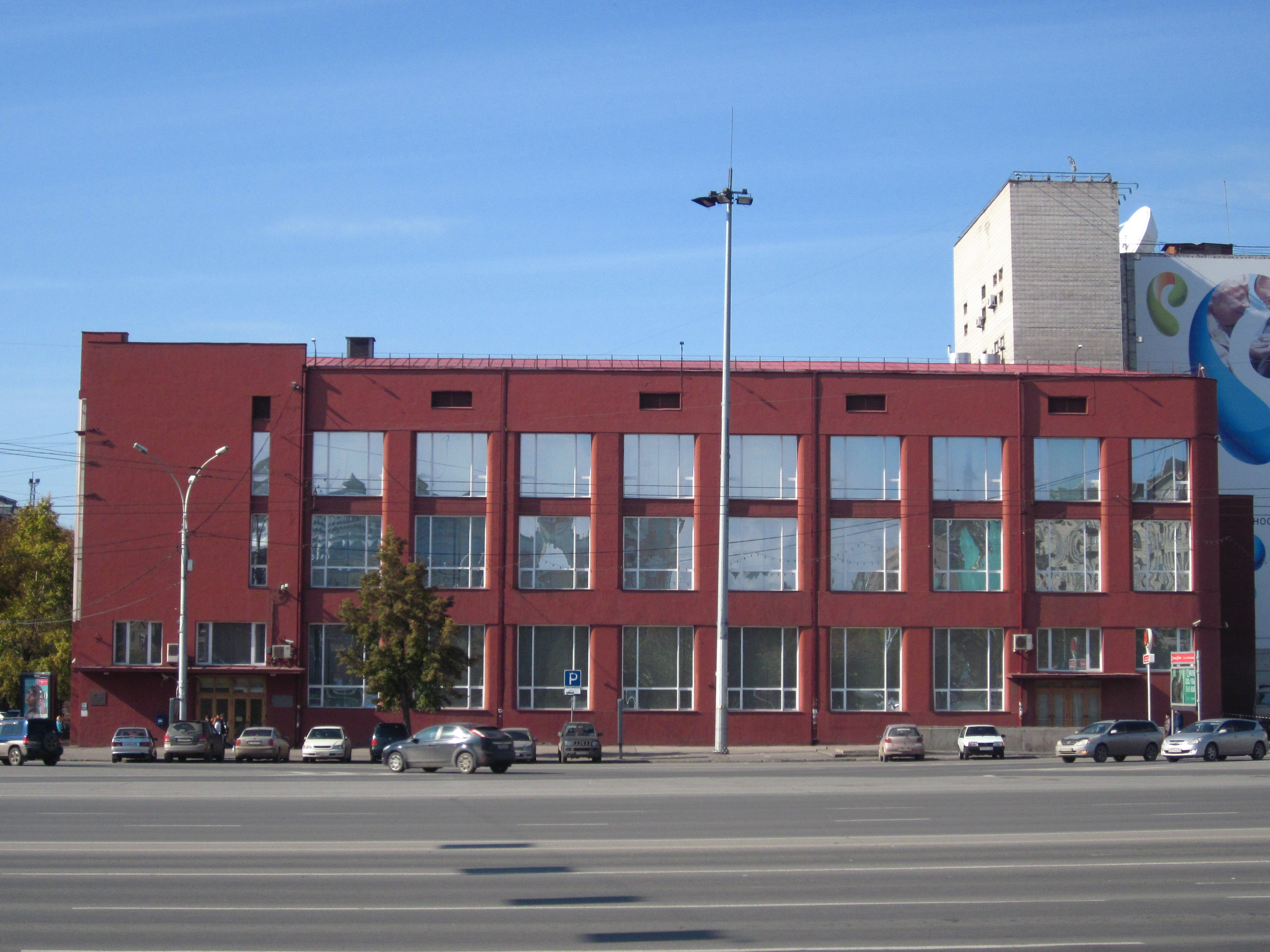
Gosbank Building

=== Post-Soviet architecture ===
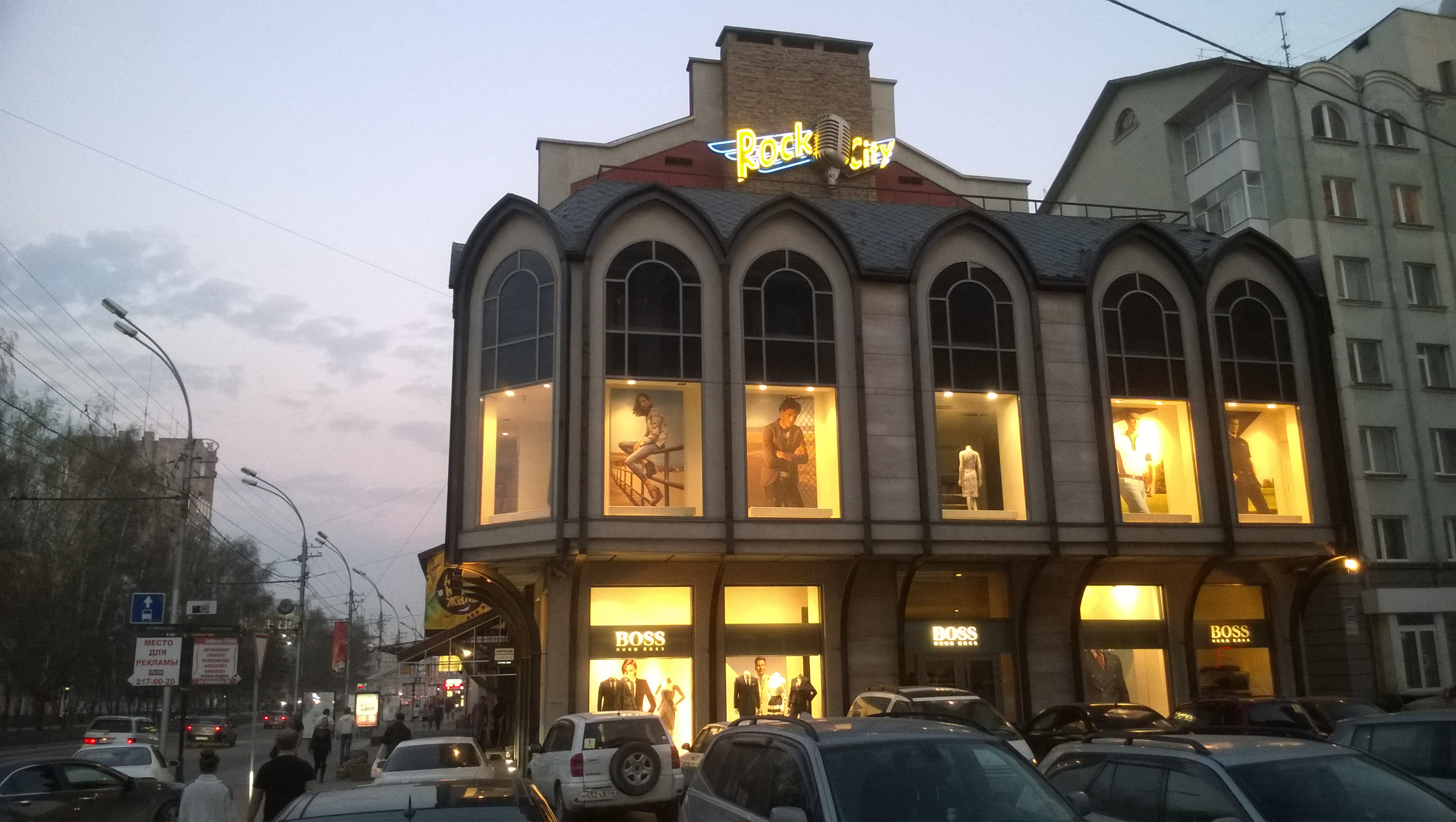

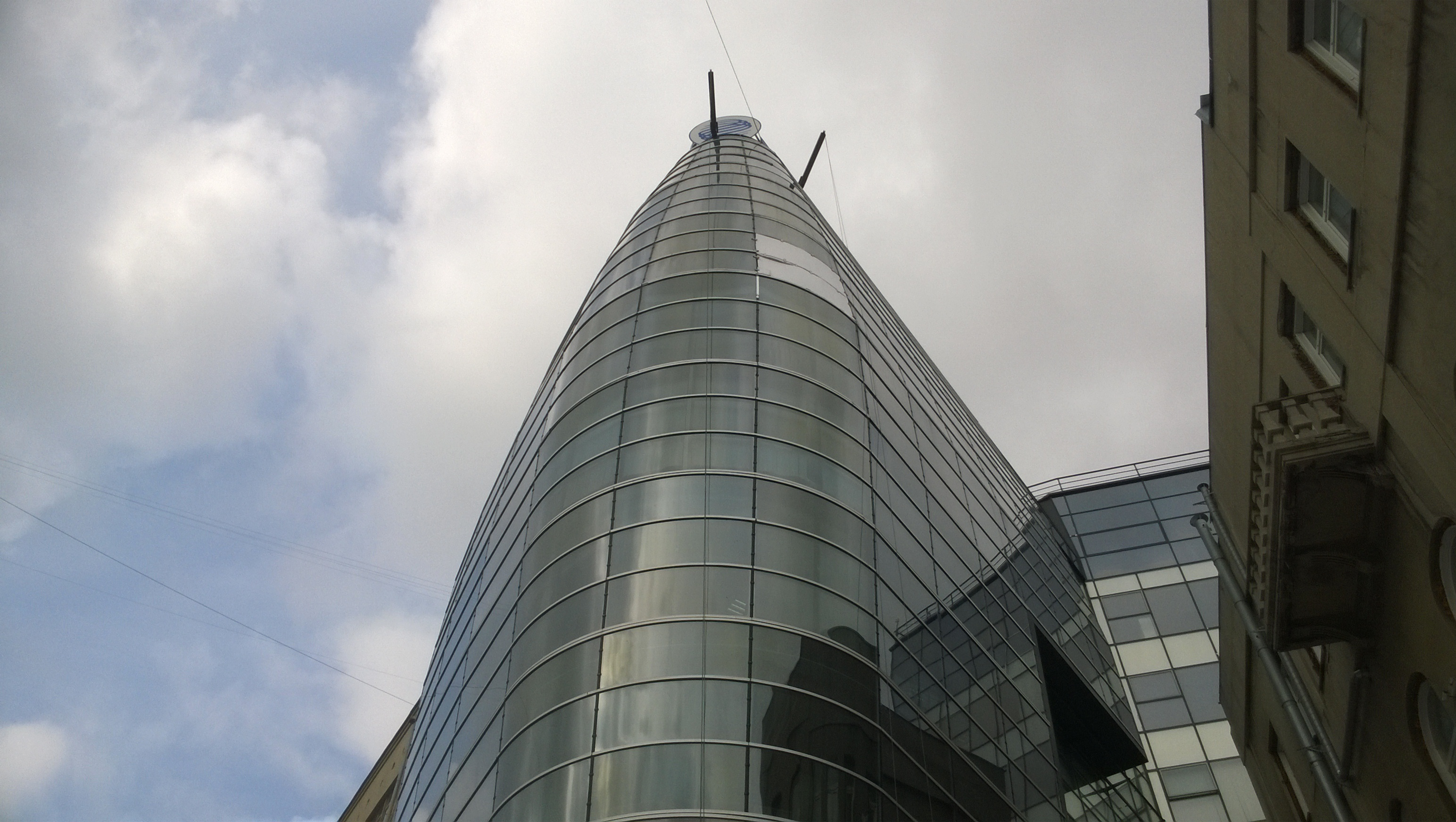

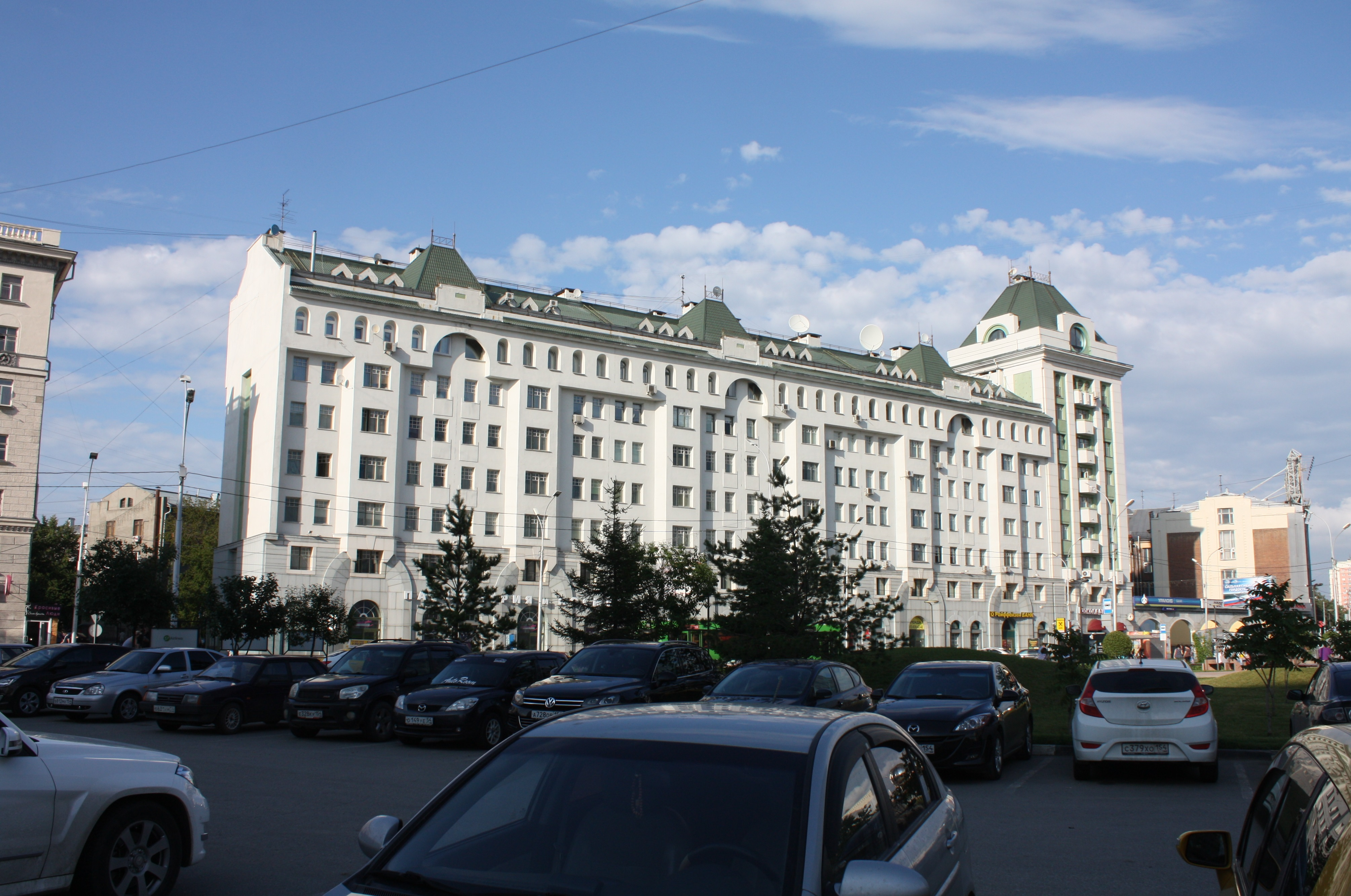

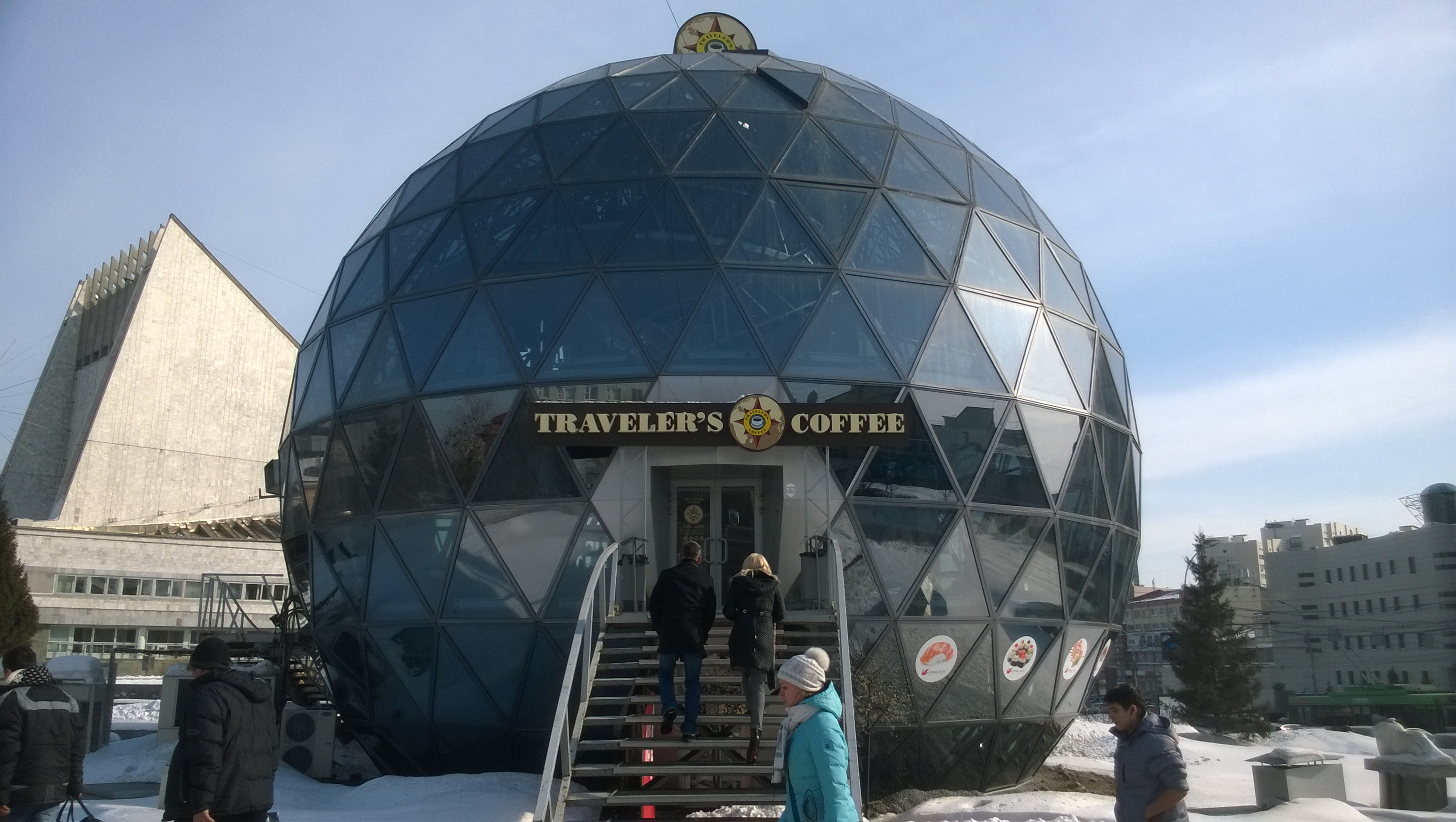

== Economy ==
=== Industry ===
- Sinar Garment Factory, it was founded in 1921.
- Novosibirsk Cartographic Factory

== Research institutes ==
- Institute of Systematics and Ecology of Animals
- N. A. Chinakal Institute of Mining
- NIIIP
- Research Institute of Electronic Devices
- Siberian Research Institute of Geology, Geophysics and Mineral Resources
- Siberian Research and Production Center of Geoinformation and Applied Geodesy

== Transportation ==
=== Bus and trolleybus ===
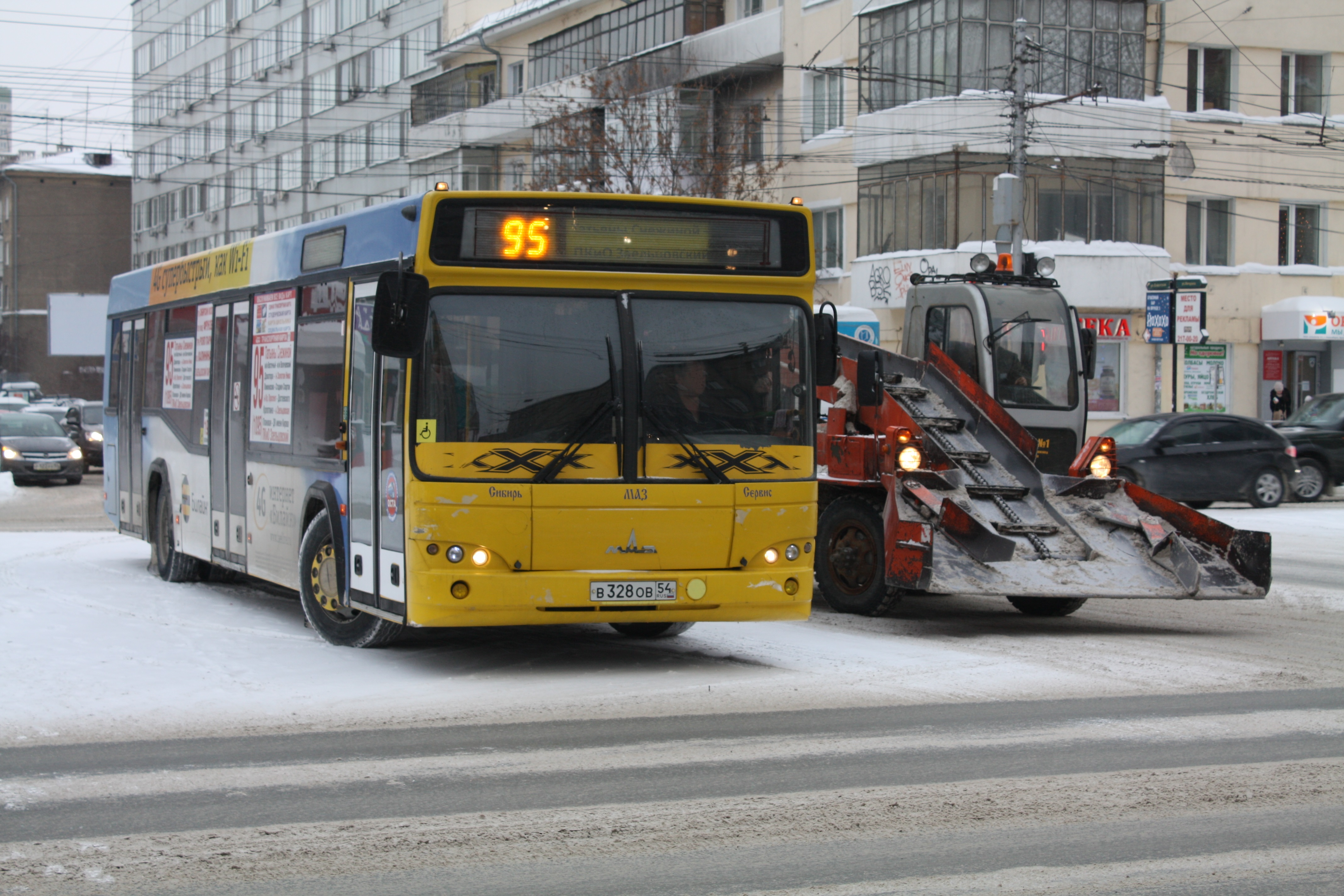
MAZ-103

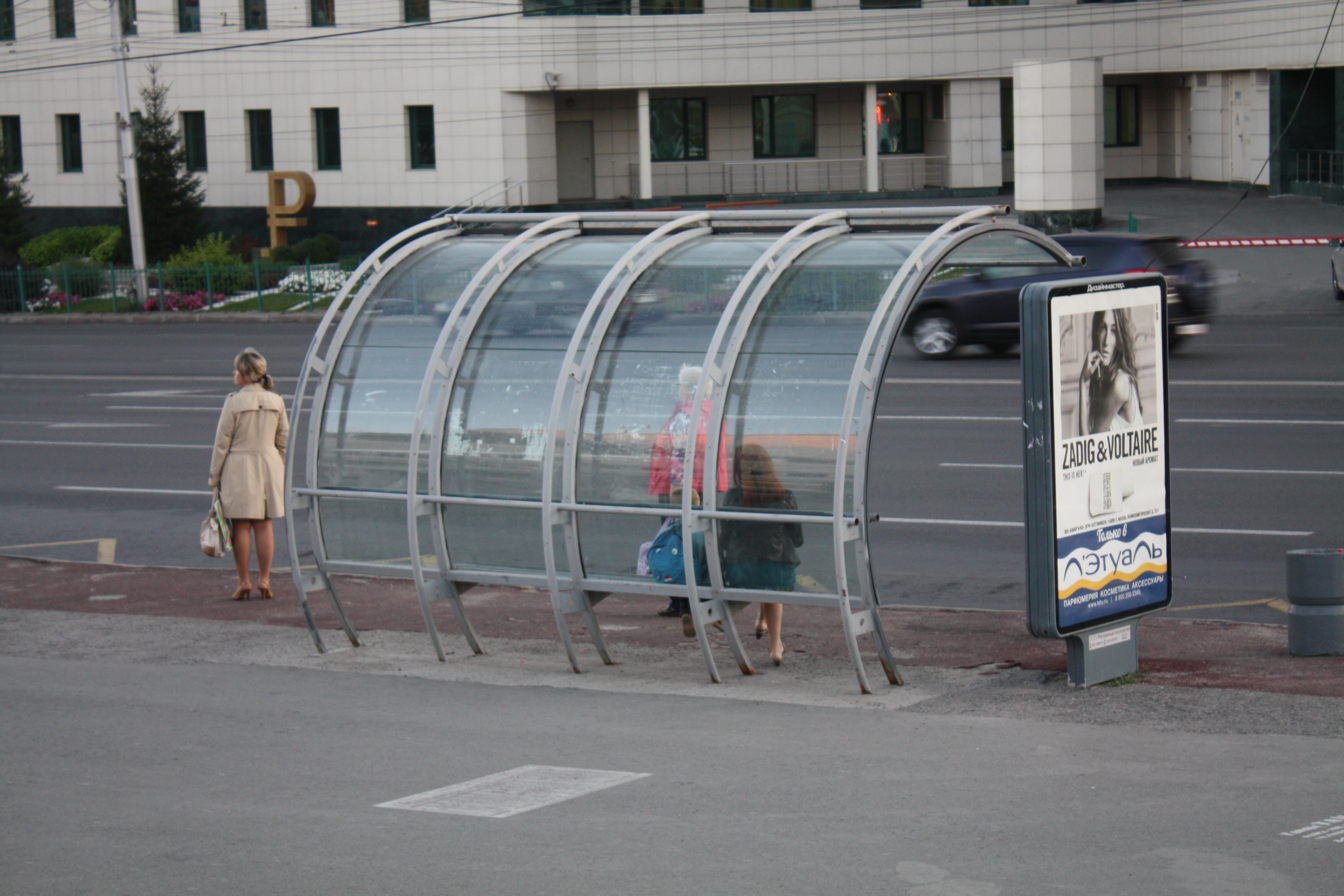
Bus stop on Oktyabrskaya Magistral.

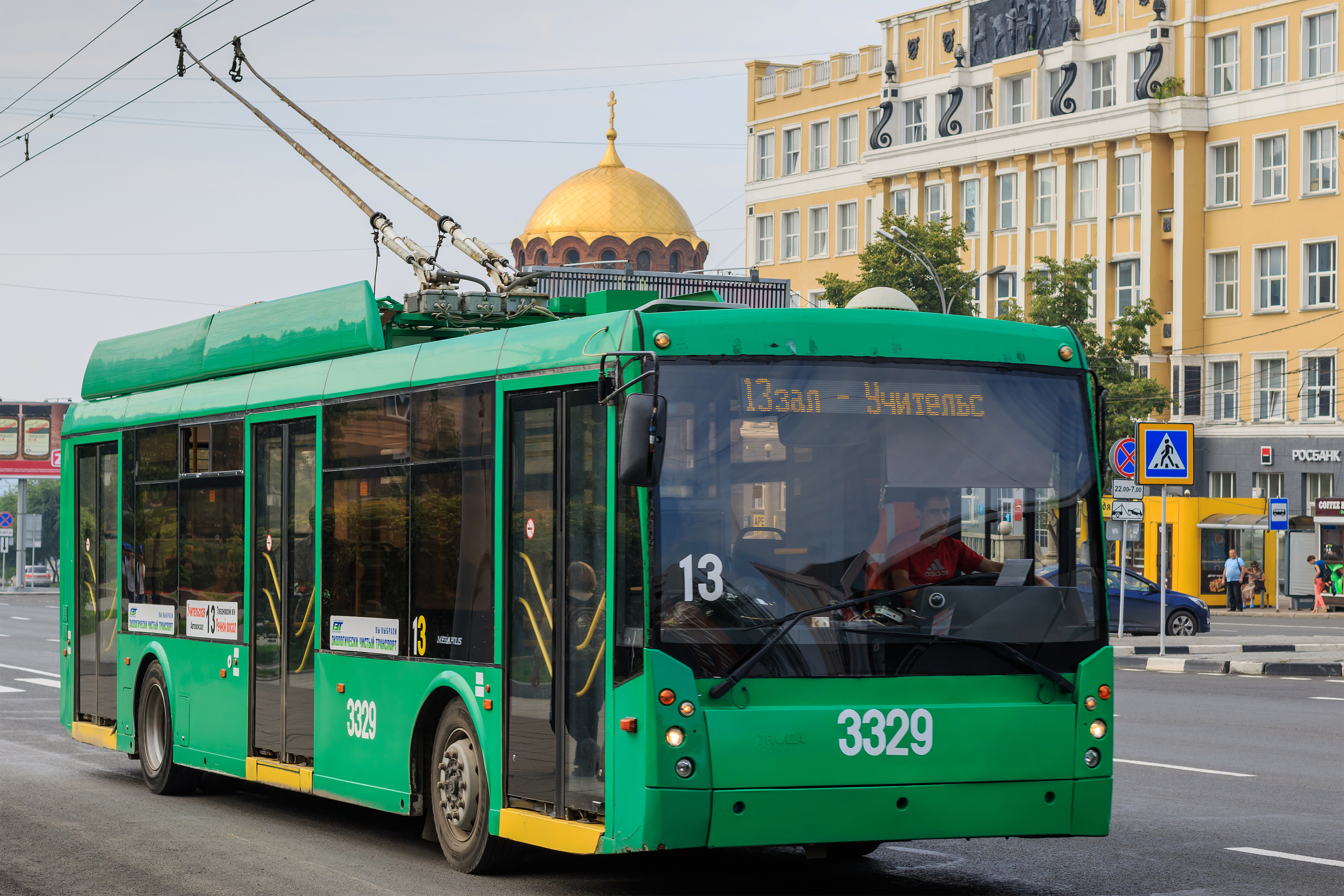

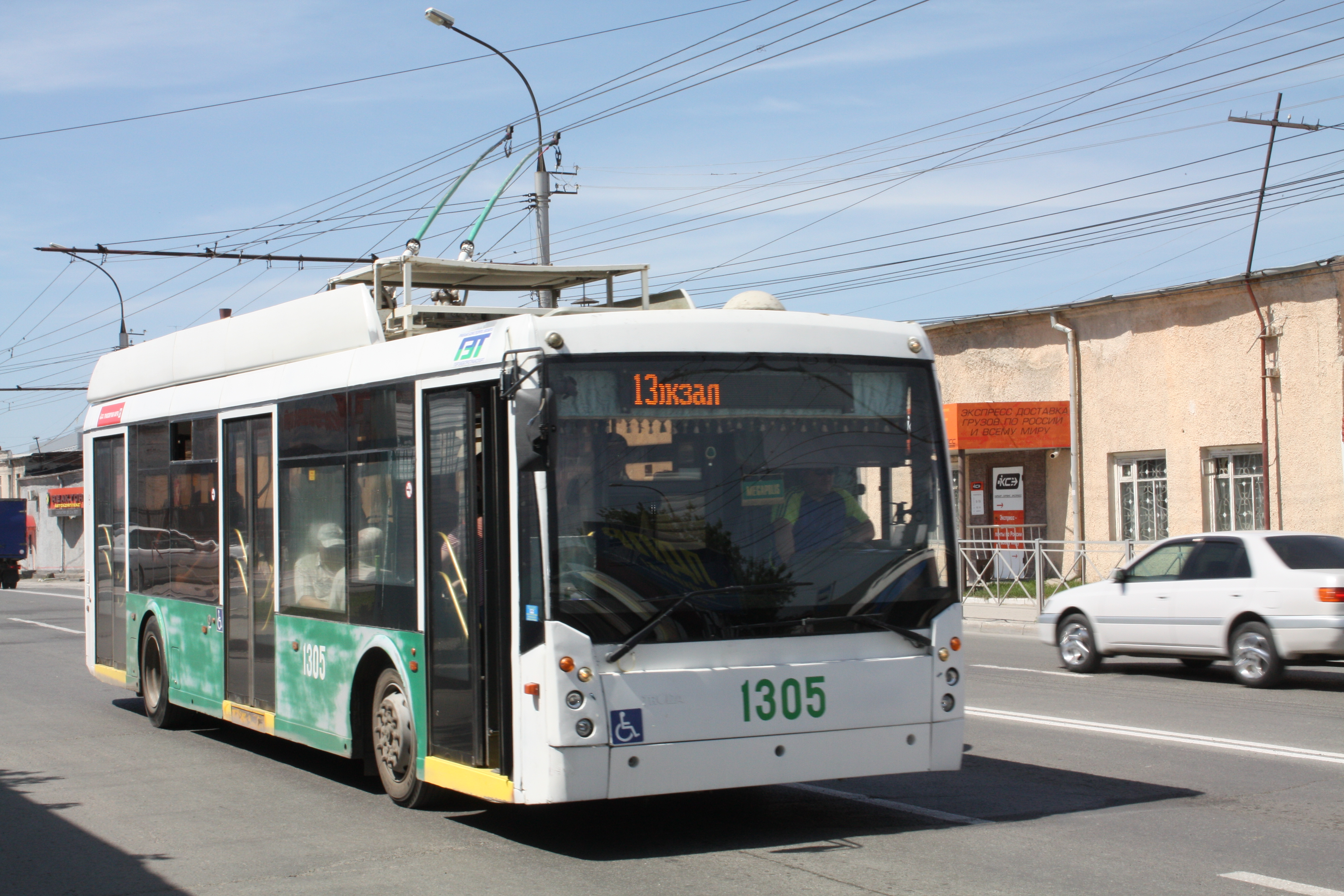

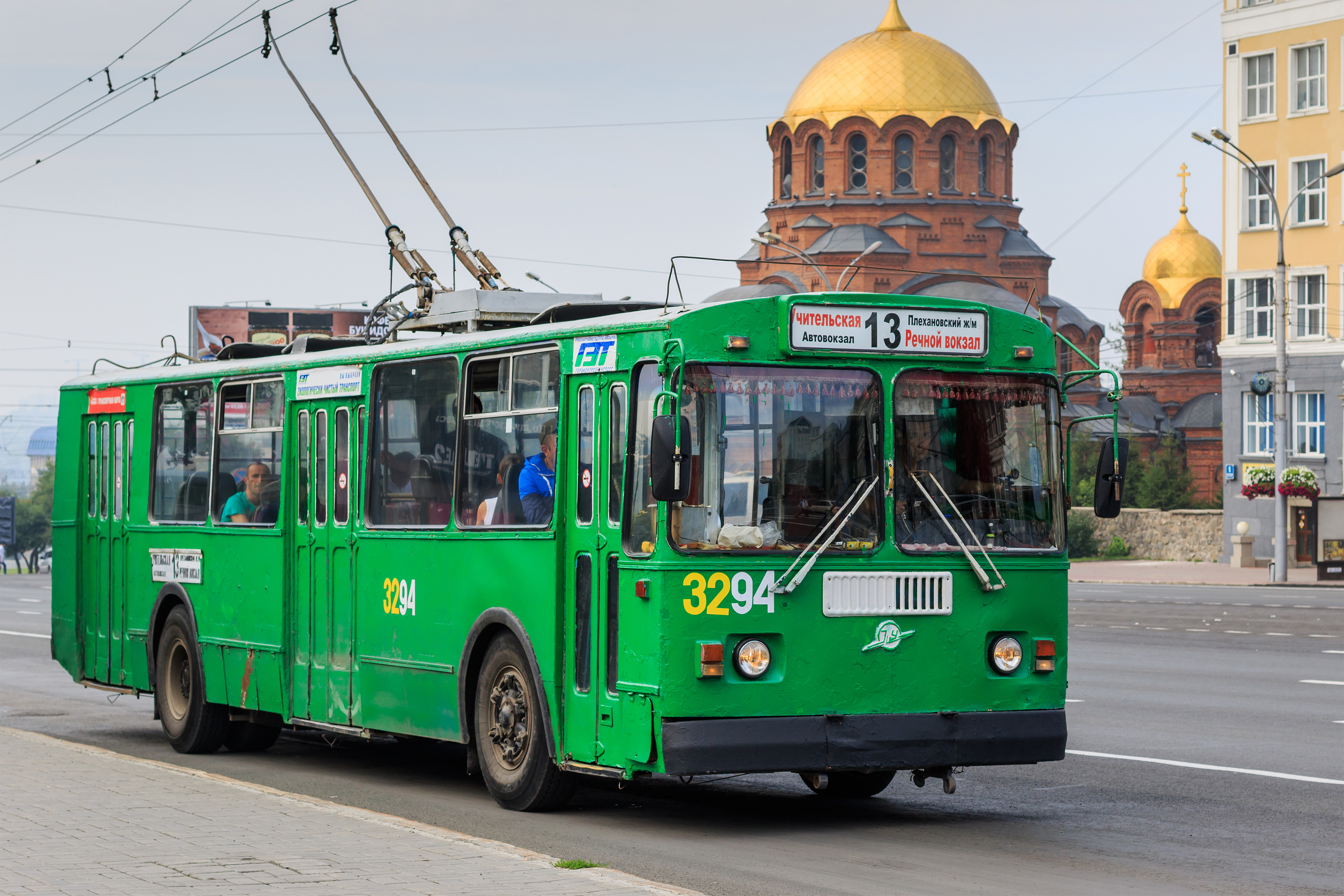

=== Tram ===
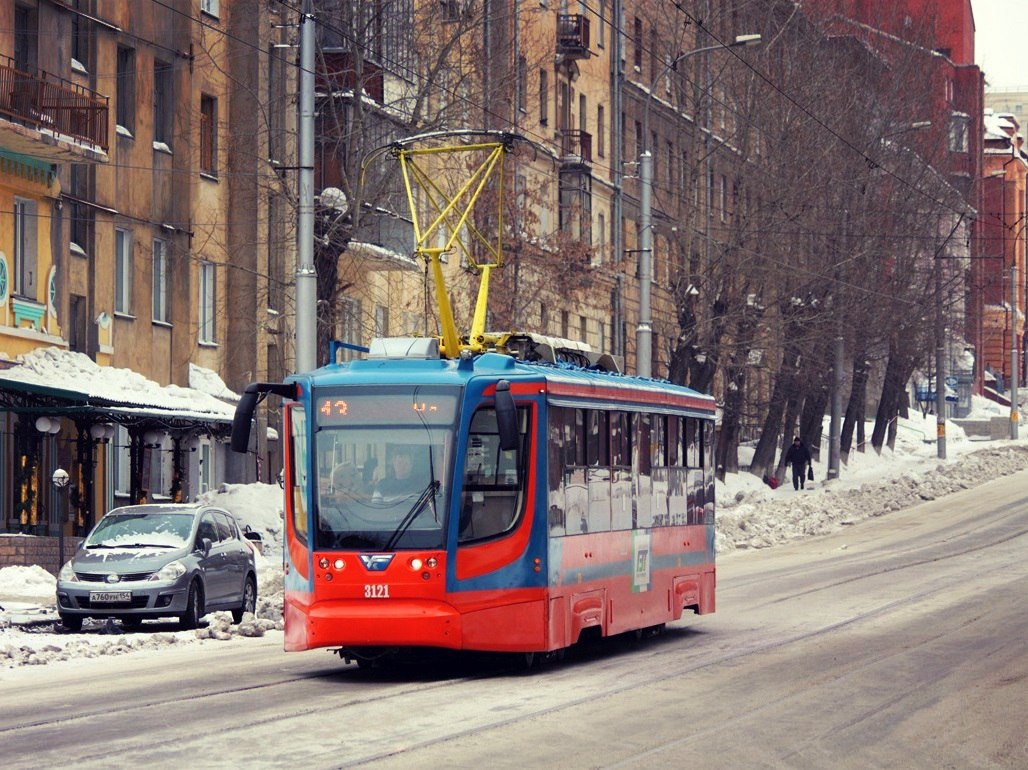

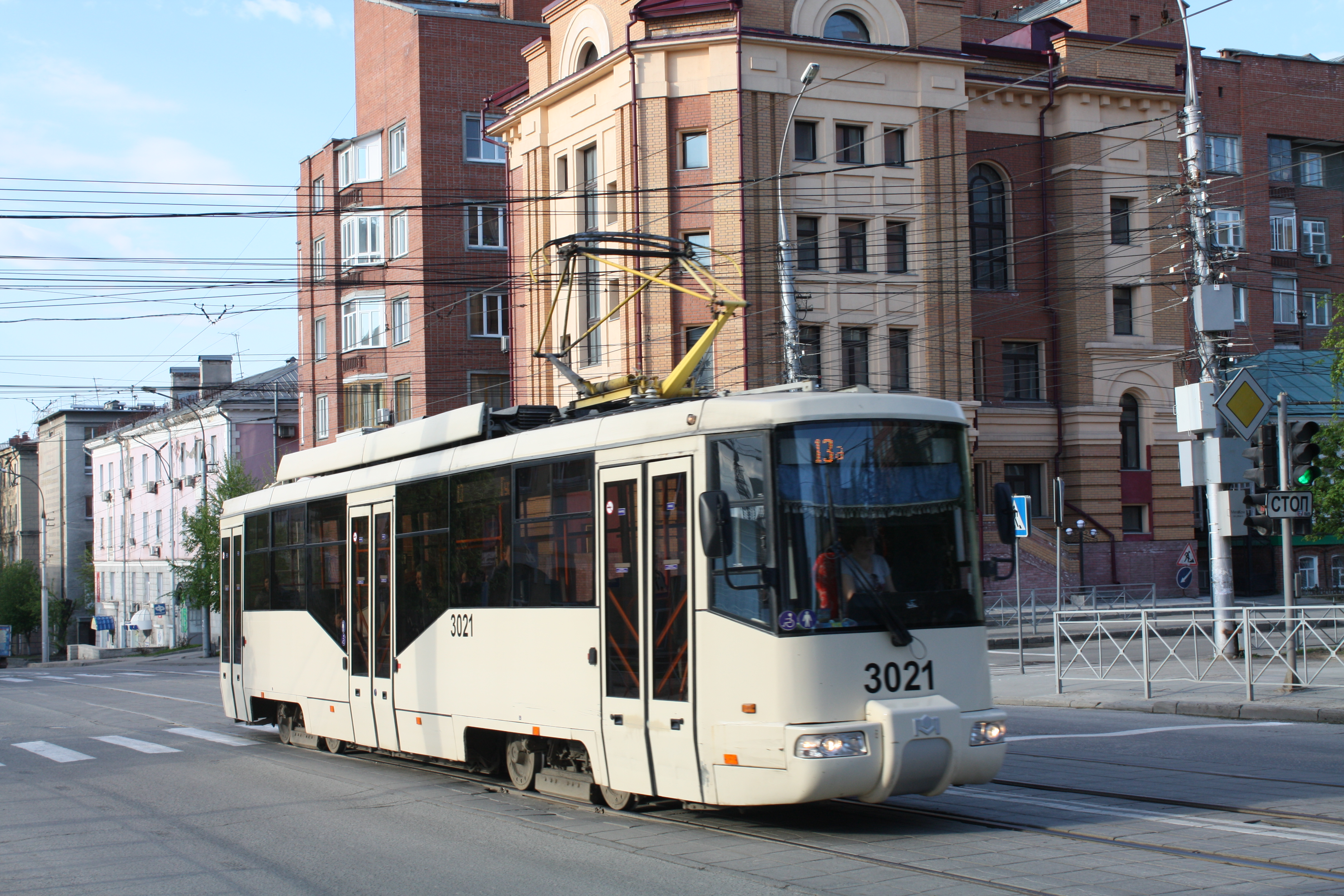

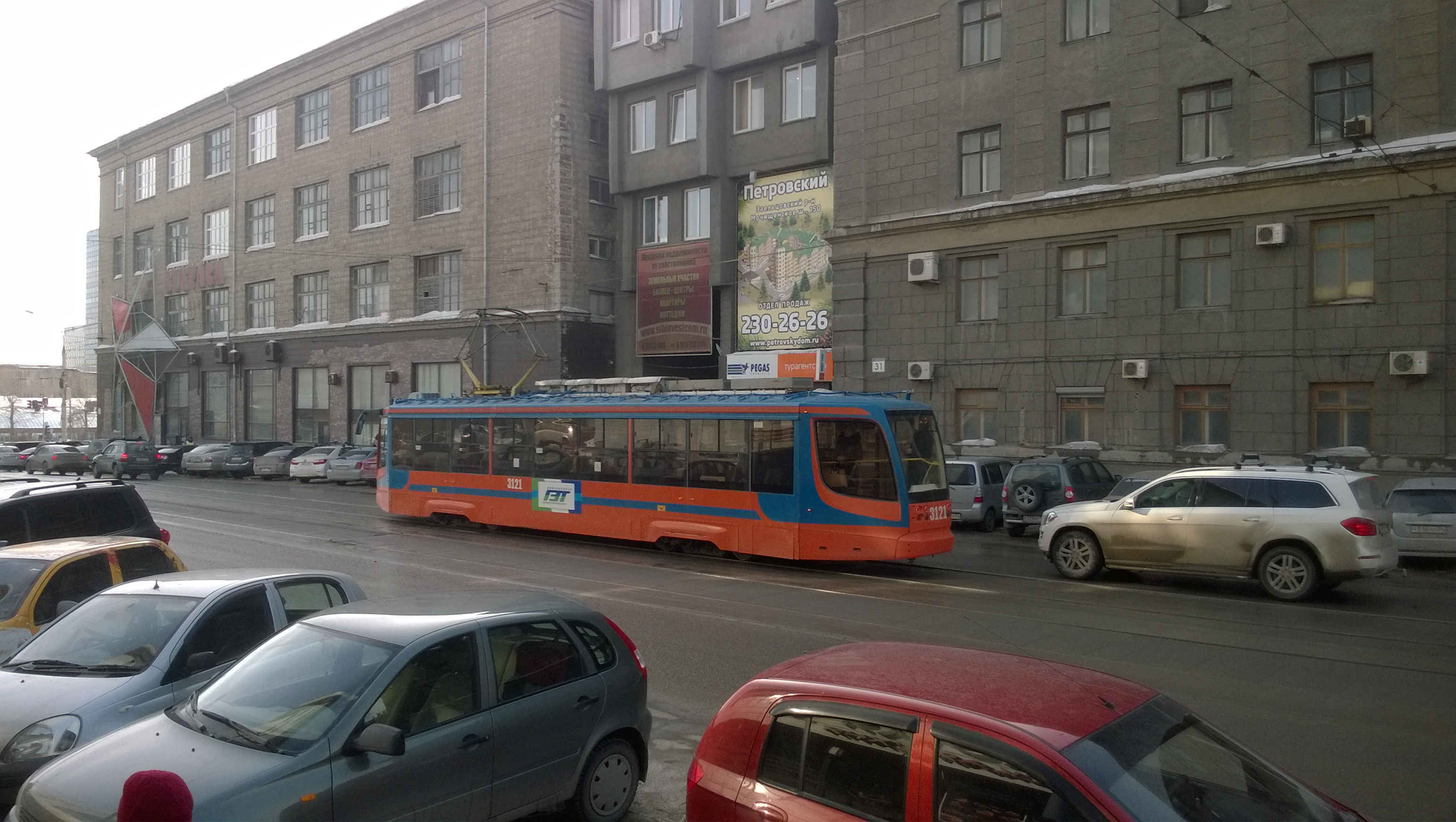

=== Novosibirsk Metro ===
Four Novosibirsk Metro stations are located in the district: Ploshchad Lenina, Krasny Prospekt, Sibirskaya and Marshala Pokryshkina.

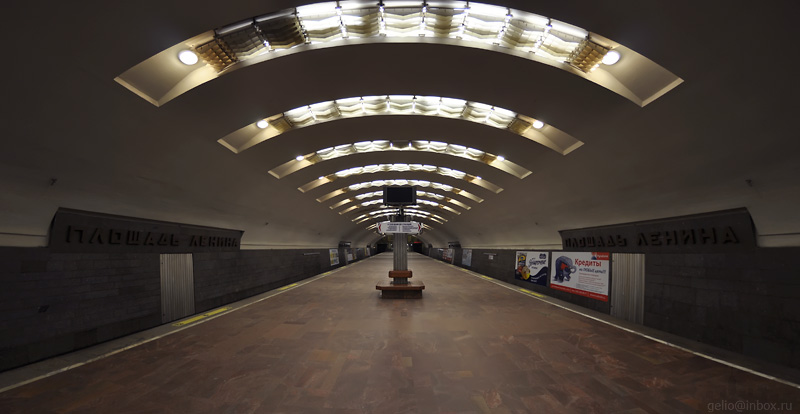
Ploshchad Lenina Station

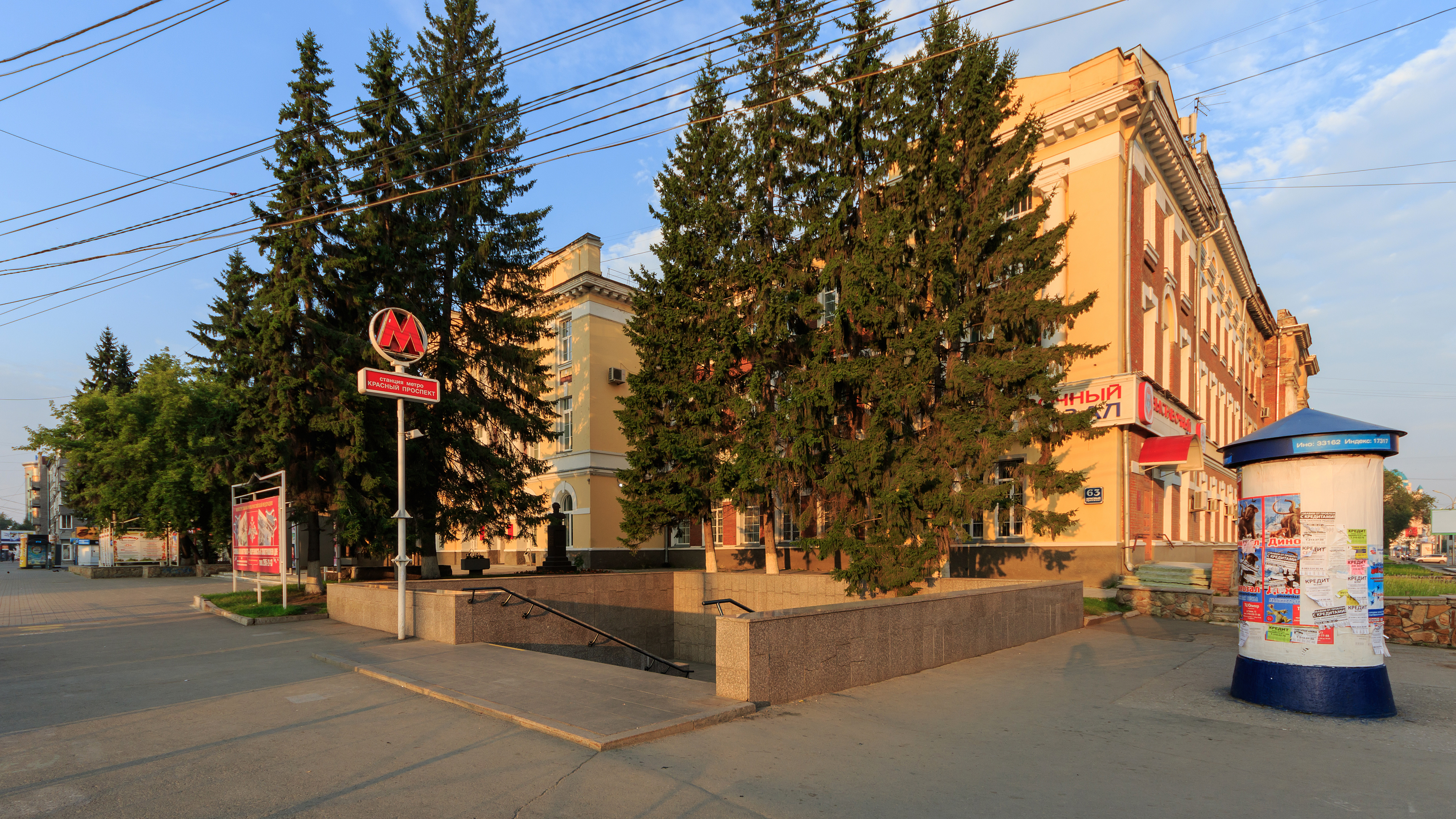
One of entrances to Krasny Prospekt Station.

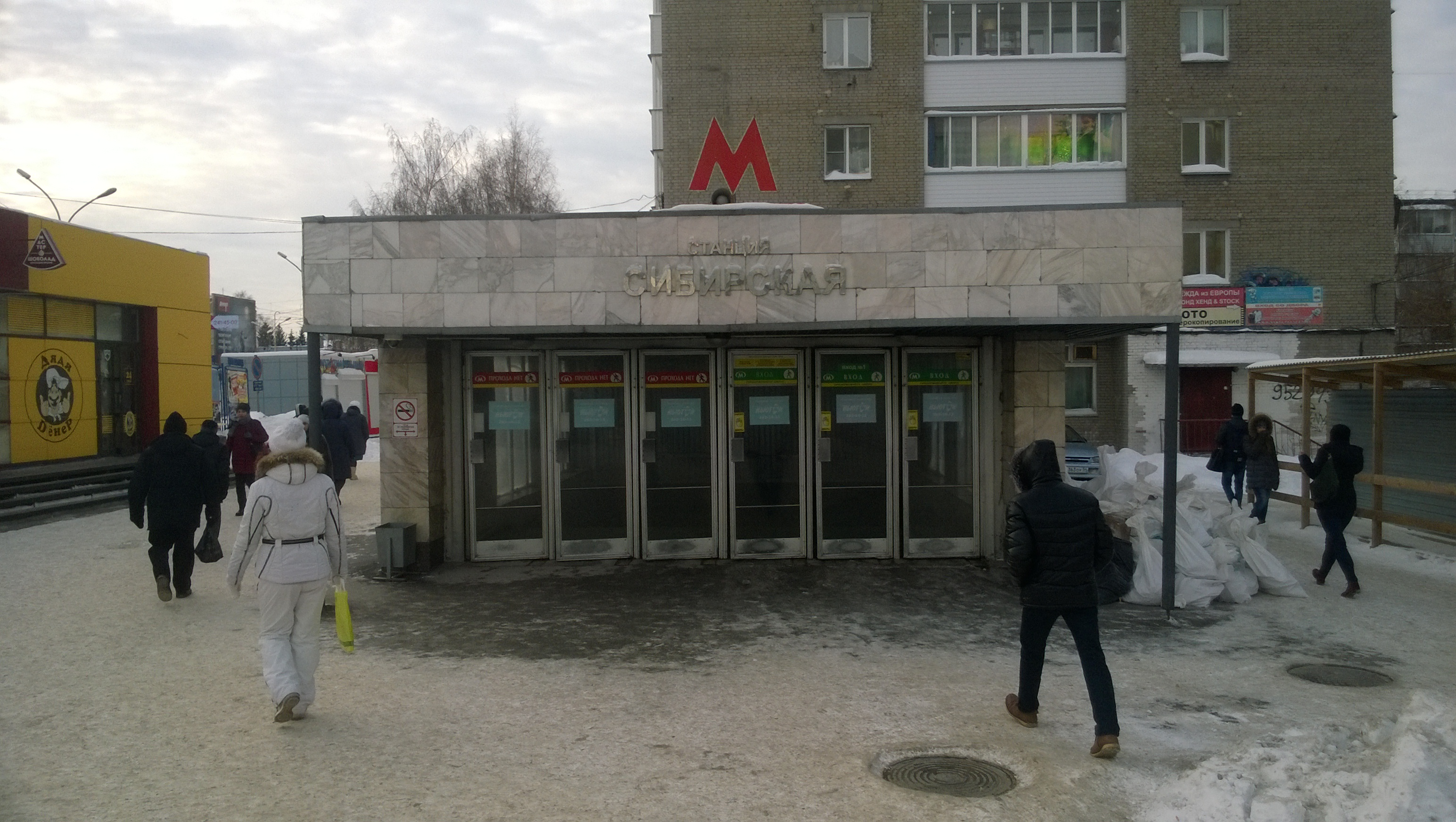
Sibirskaya Station

Marshala Pokryshkina Station
