= Yadrintsevskaya Street, Novosibirsk =

Street in Novosibirsk, Russia

Yadrintsevskaya Street
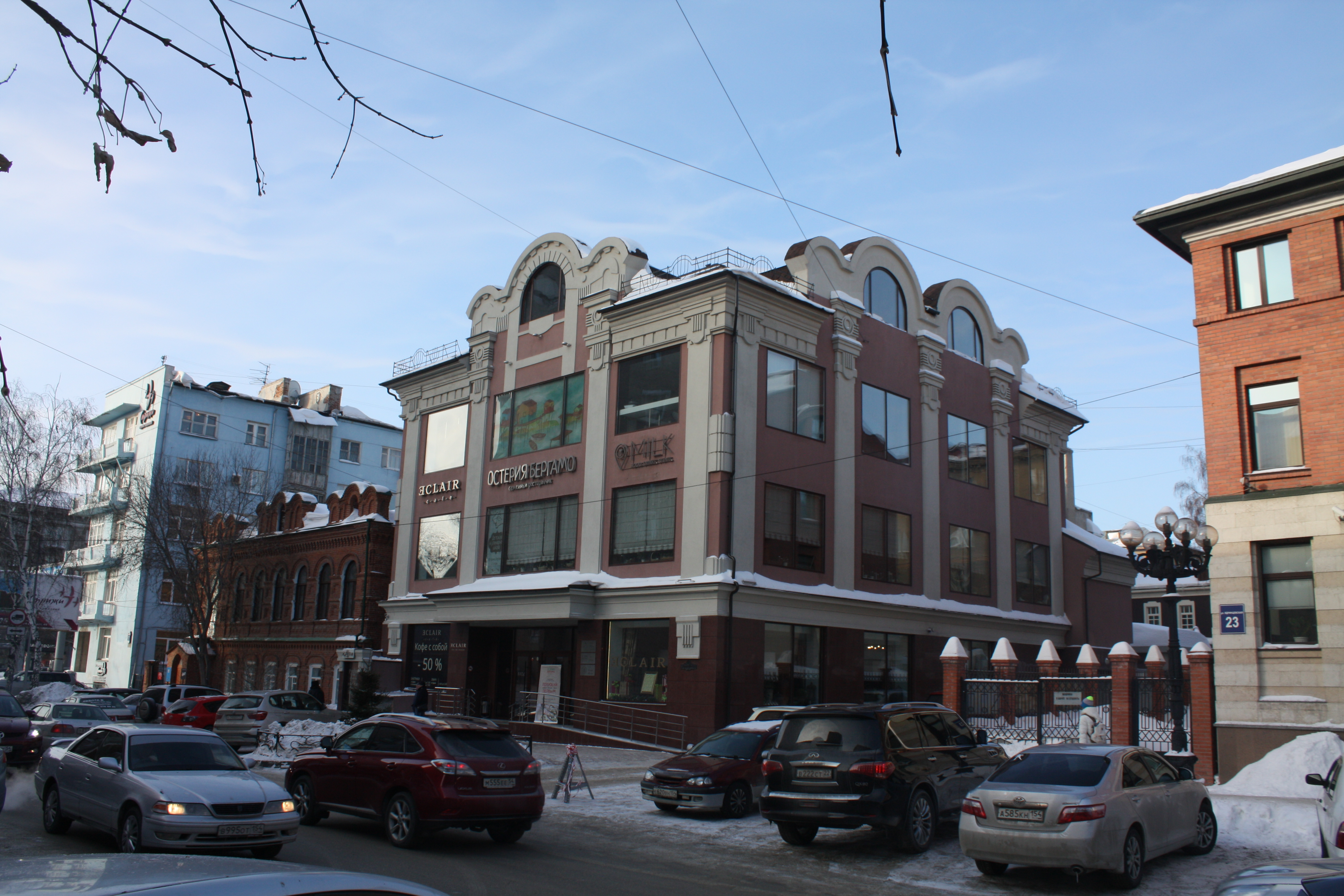
- Native name: Улица Ядринцевская (Russian)
- Location: Novosibirsk; Russia

Yadrintsevskya Street (Russian: Ядринцевская улица) is a street in Tsentralny City District of Novosibirsk, Russia. The street runs from the T-shaped intersection with Krasny Avenue, crosses Kamenskaya, Michurin and Shamshin Family streets, then branches into three streets: Potaninsky Lane, Yadrintsevsky Konny Spusk and Olga Zhilina Street.

== History ==
The street was named after Nikolai Yadrintsev, Russian public figure, explorer, archaeologist, and turkologist.

== Architecture ==
- Yadrintsevskaya Street 25 is a two-story building. It was built in 1911.
- Totorin House is a two-story building. It was built in 1912.
- City School Building. It was built in 1912. Architect: Andrey Kryachkov.
- Aeroflot House is a constructivist building on the corner of Krasny Avenue and Yadrintsevskaya Street. It was built in the 1930s.
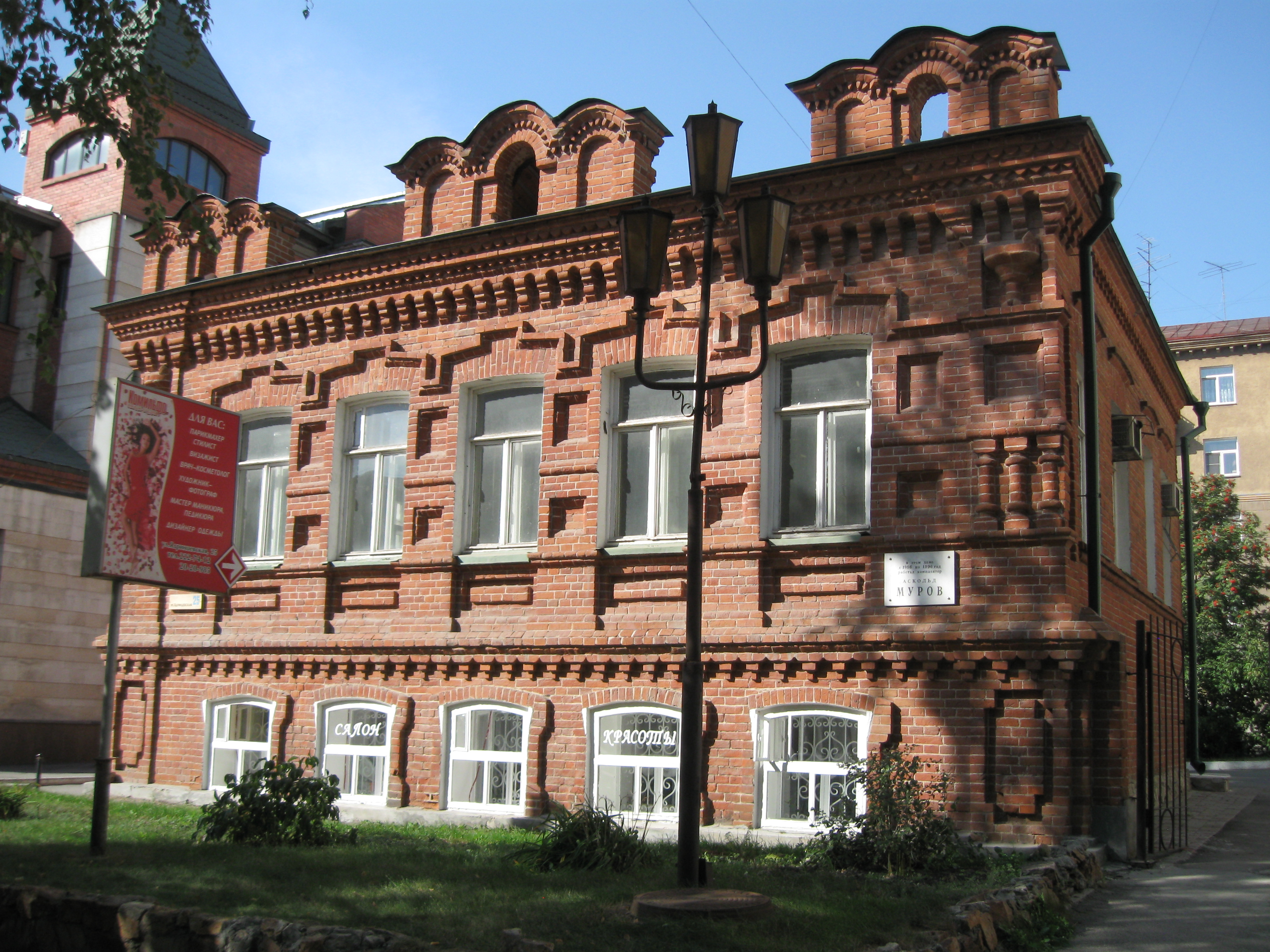
Yadrintsevskaya Street 25

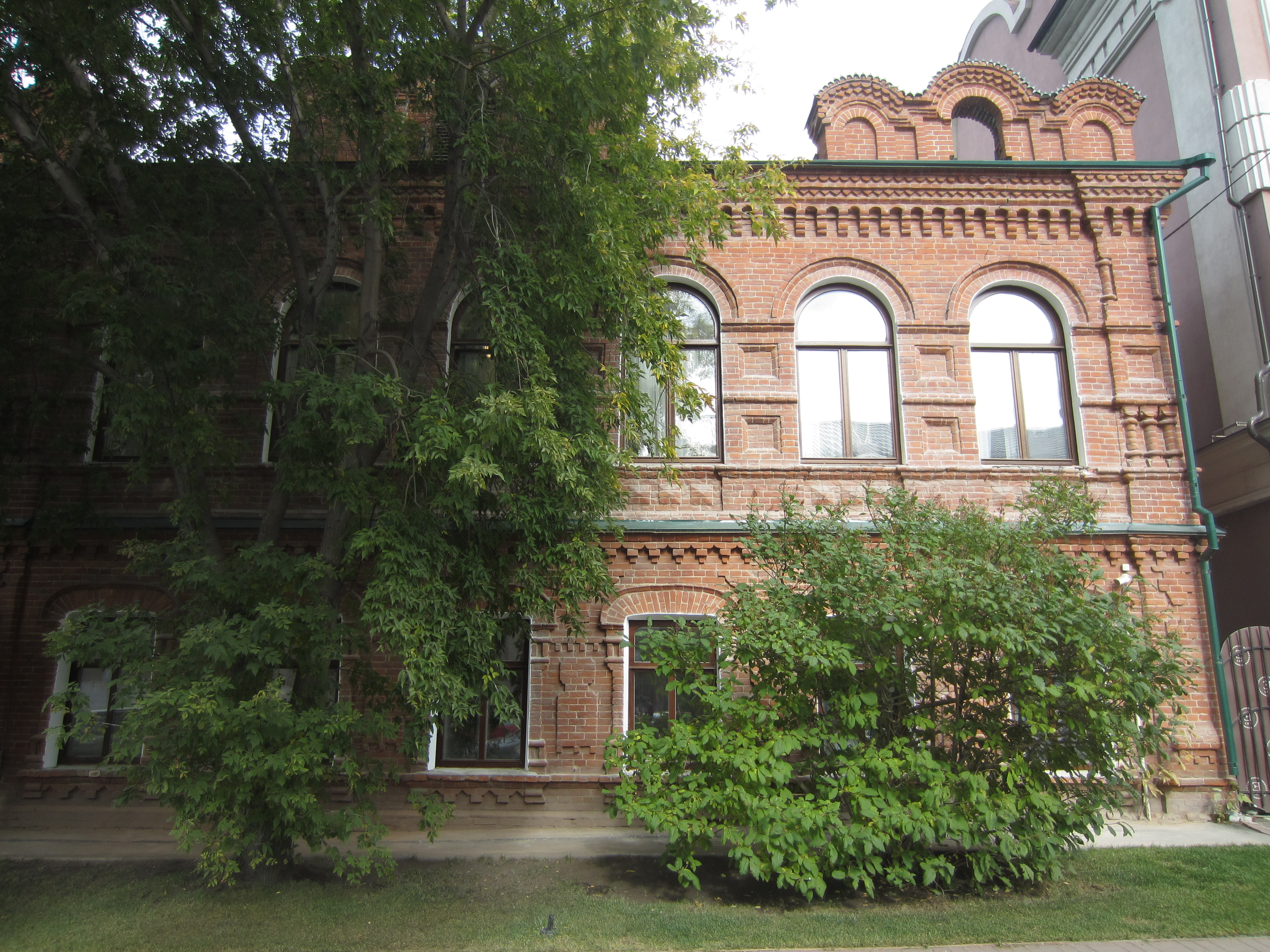
Totorin House

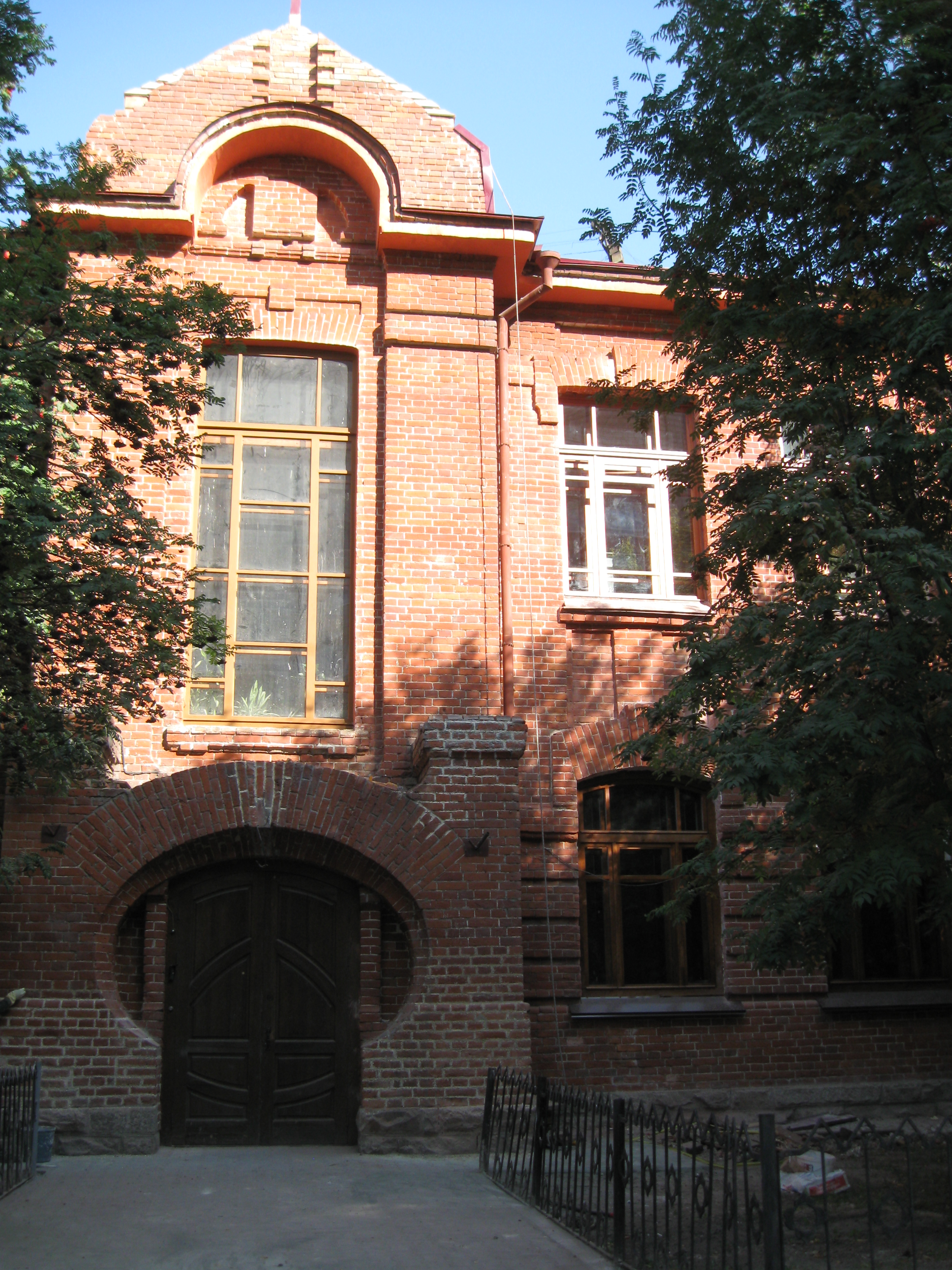
City School Building

== Educational institutions ==
- Novosibirsk State Theater Institute
- Novosibirsk State University of Economics and Management

== Notable residents ==
- Yanka Dyagileva was a Russian poet, singer-songwriter and punk rock singers. She lived on the corner of Yadrintsevskaya and Shamshin Family streets. In 2014 a memorial plaque was installed on the building.
