= Rabochaya Pyatiletka (Novosibirsk) =

Building in Novosibirsk, Russia

- Рабочая пятилетка
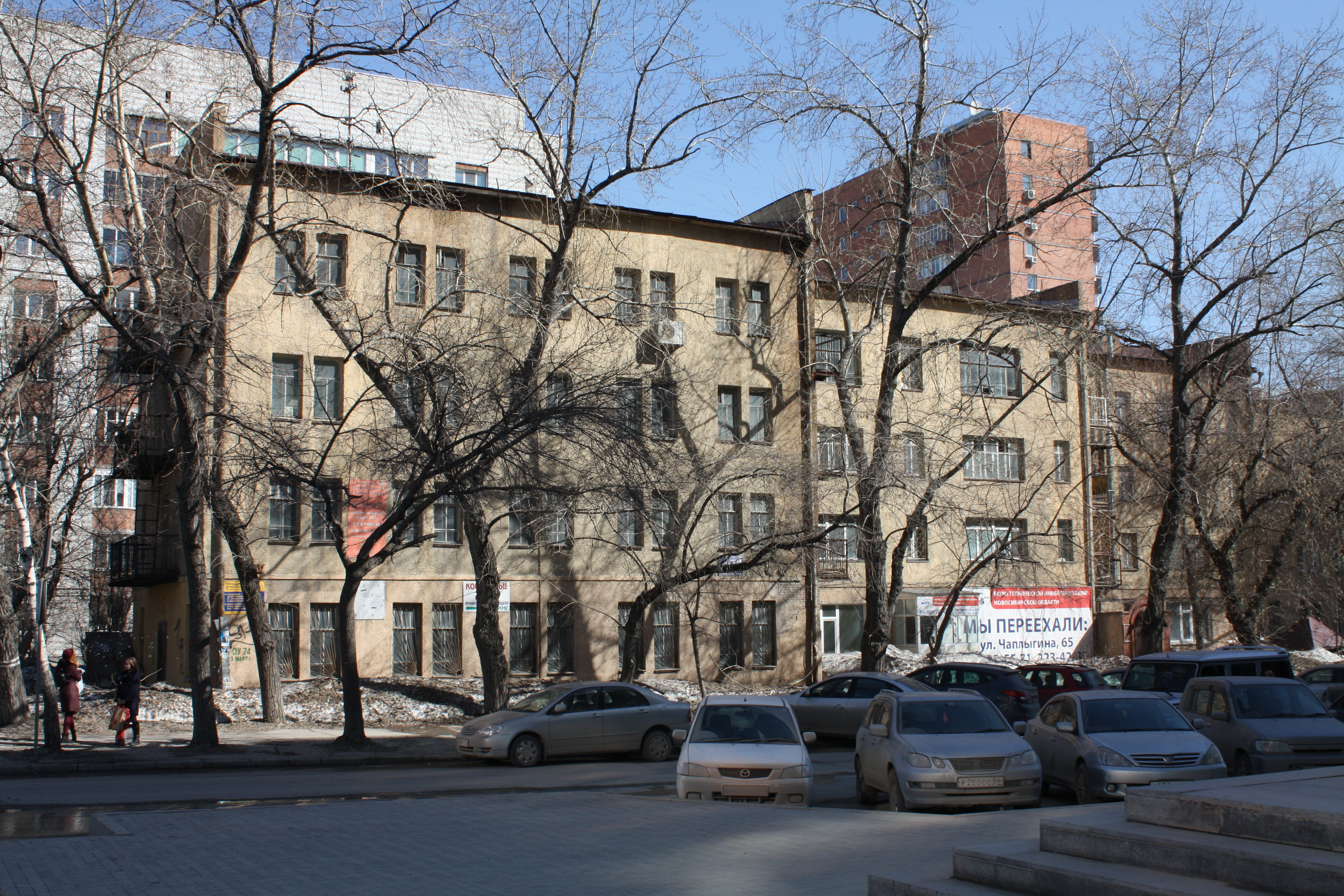
- Interactive map of the Rabochaya Pyatiletka area

General information
- Status: Demolished
- Architectural style: constructivism
- Location: Kamenskaya Street 18, Novosibirsk, Russia
- Completed: 1930
- Demolished: 2019

Rabochaya Pyatiletka (Russian: Рабочая пятилетка) was a constructivist building in Tsentralny City District of Novosibirsk, Russia. It was located on the corner of Kamenskaya and Chaplygin streets. The building was constructed in 1930.

== History ==
In 1930, the building was built for 250 residents.

The building was demolished on 5 January 2019.

== See also ==
- Aeroflot House
- Polyclinic No. 1
- Soyuzzoloto House
