= Kamenskaya Street, Novosibirsk =

Street in Novosibirsk, Russia

Kamenskaya Street
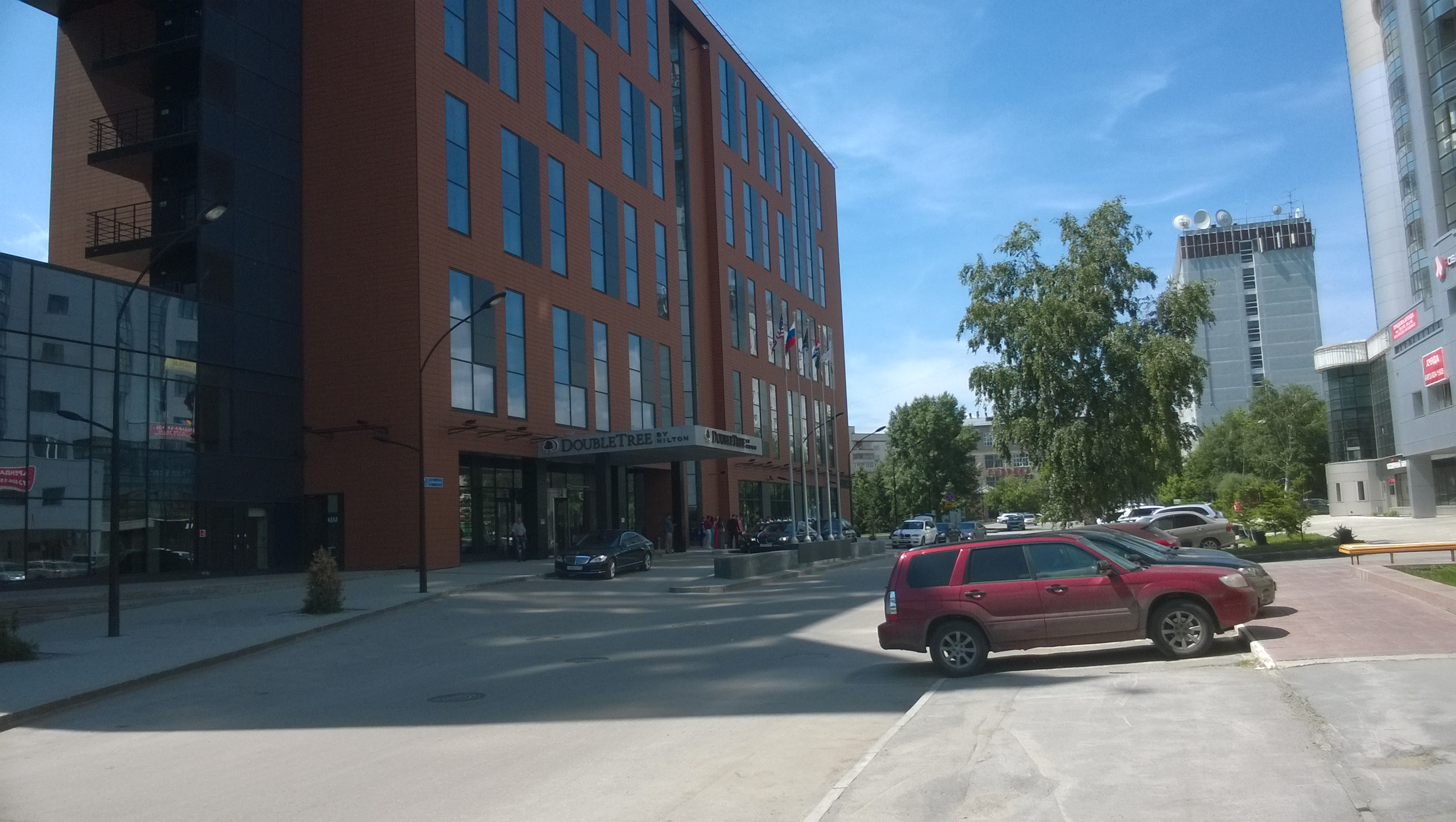
- Native name: Каменская улица (Russian)
- Location: Novosibirsk; Russia

Kamenskaya Street (Russian: Каменская улица) is a street in Tsentralny City District of Novosibirsk, Russia. The street starts from Oktyabrskaya Magistral, runs north and forms a T-intersection with Pisarev Street.

== Architecture ==
- Rabochaya Pyatiletka is a zig zag building built in the 1930s
- Soyuzzoloto House is a constructivist building on the corner of Kamenskaya and Oktyabrskaya streets. It was built in 1932.
- Baths No 8 is a public bath built in 1937.
- Doubletree by Hilton is a hotel built in 2010. It is located on the corner of Kamenskaya and Chaplygin streets.
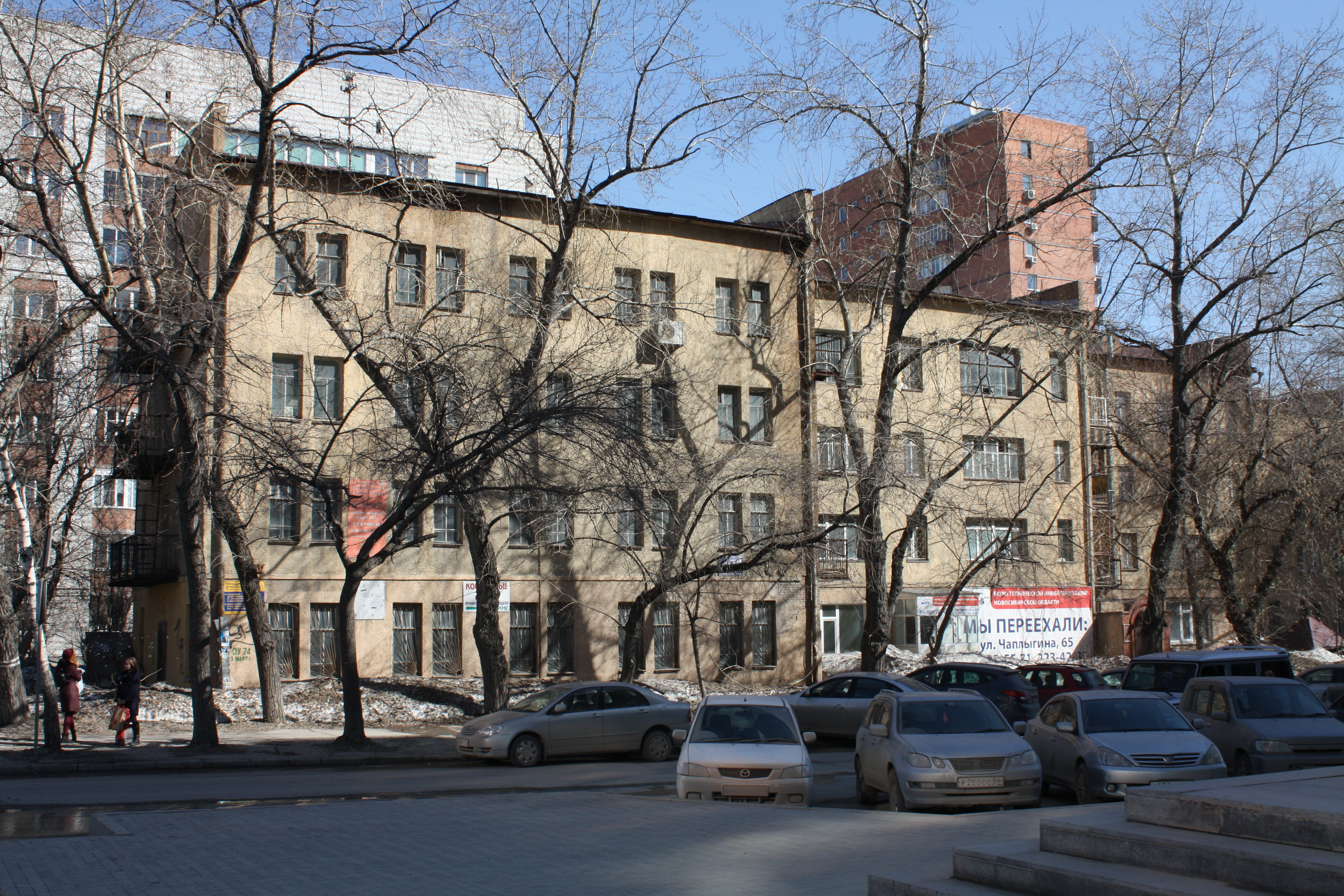
Rabochaya Pyatiletka

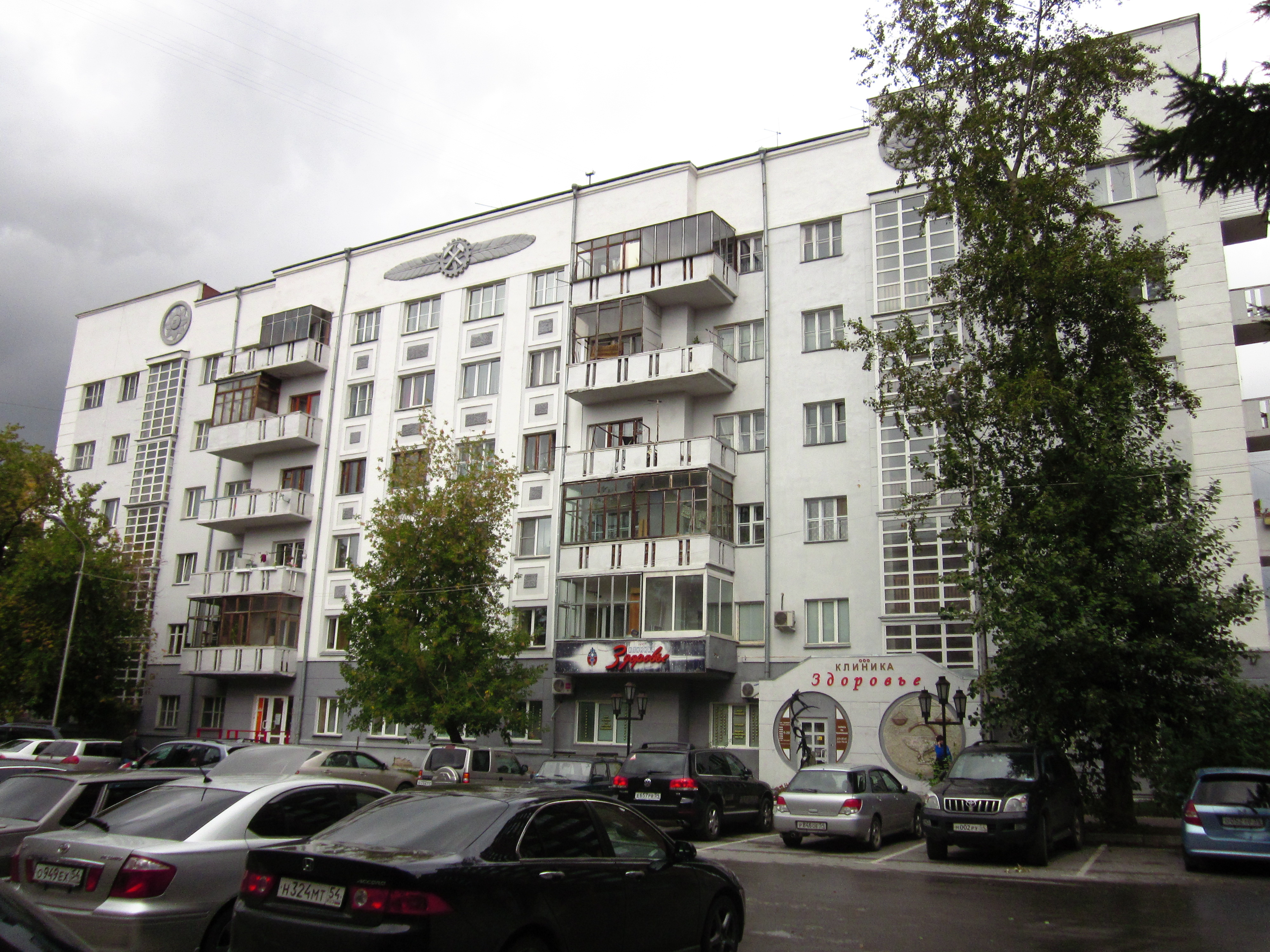
Soyuzzoloto House

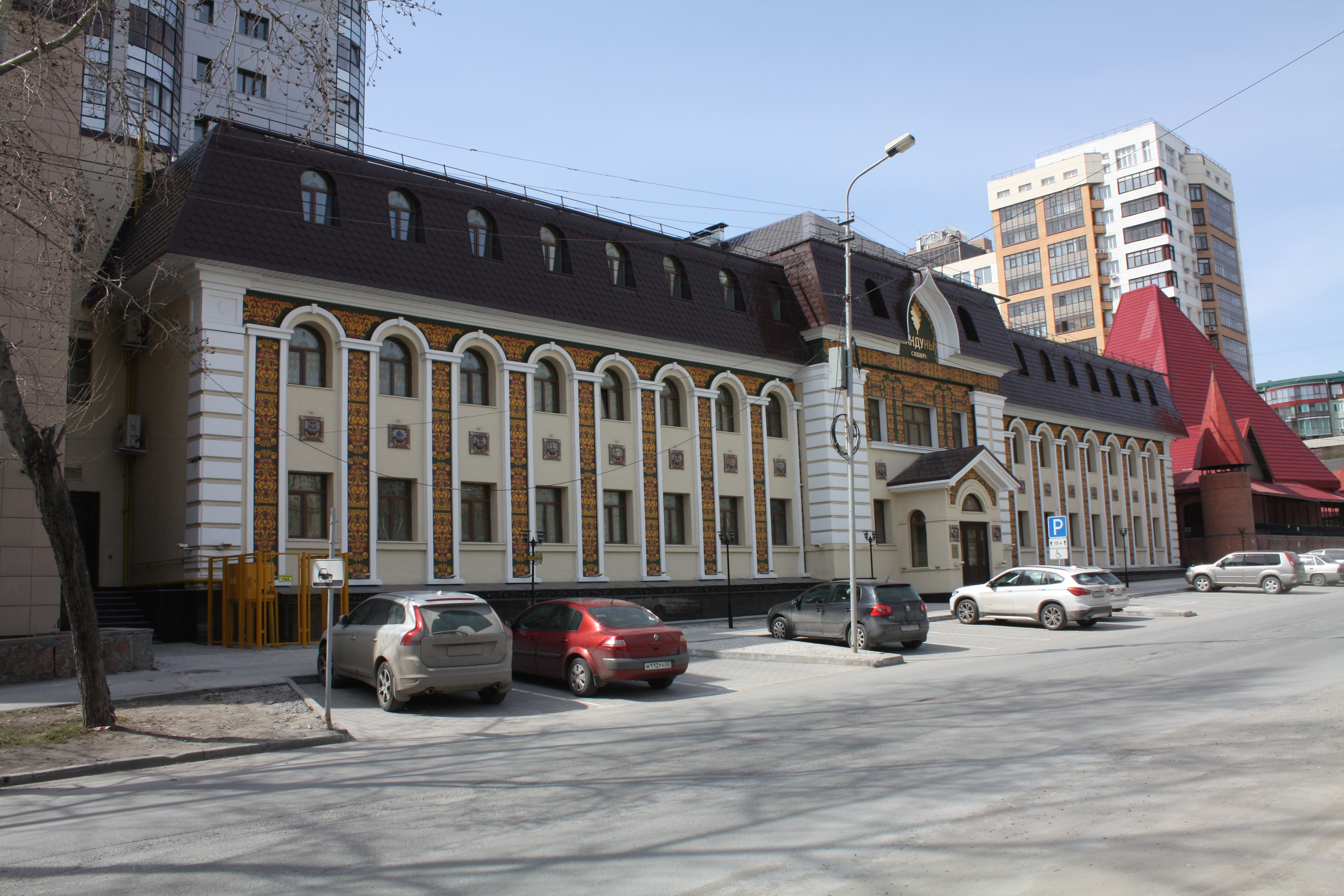
Baths No. 8

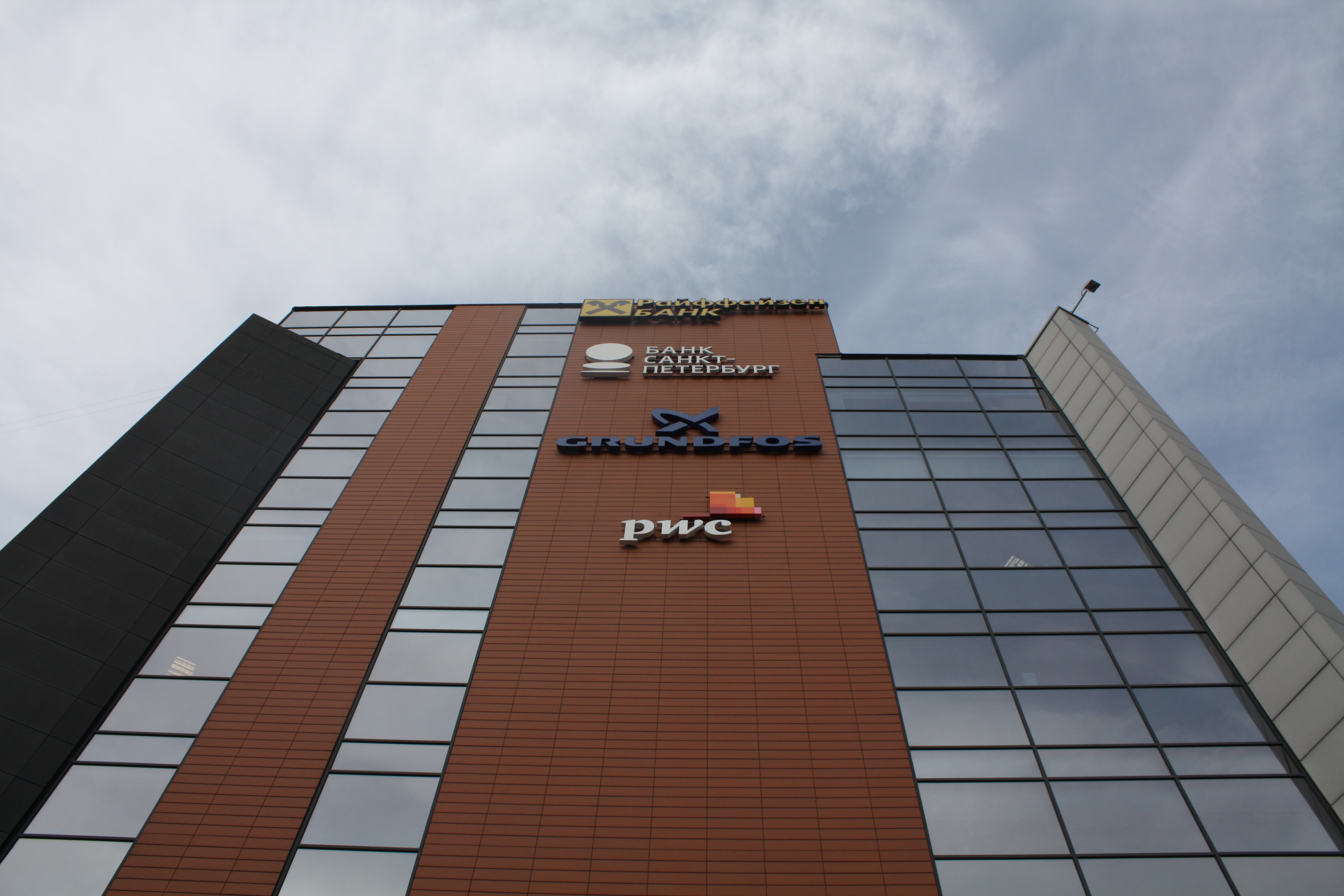
Doubletree by Hilton

== Churches ==
- Transfiguration Cathedral is a catholic cathedral on the corner of Kamenskaya and Gorky streets. It was built in 1997.

== Educational institutions ==
- Novosibirsk Music College named after Askold Murov
- Novosibirsk State Choreographic College
- Novosibirsk State University of Economics and Management
- Novosibirsk Trade and Economic College

== Cultural organizations ==
- Beit Menakhem is a Jewish community cultural center. It is located on the corner of Kamenskaya and Shetinkin Street.
- Novosibirsk Globus Theatre
- Novosibirsk Musical Theater

== Sports objects ==
- Spartak Stadium

== Parks ==
- Central Park

== Retail ==
- Central Market
- Galereya Novosibirsk Shopping Mall
- Jupiter Shopping Center
- Moskva Shopping Center
