= Soyuzzoloto House =

Building in Tsentralny, Novosibirsk, Russia

- Жилой дом «Союззолото»
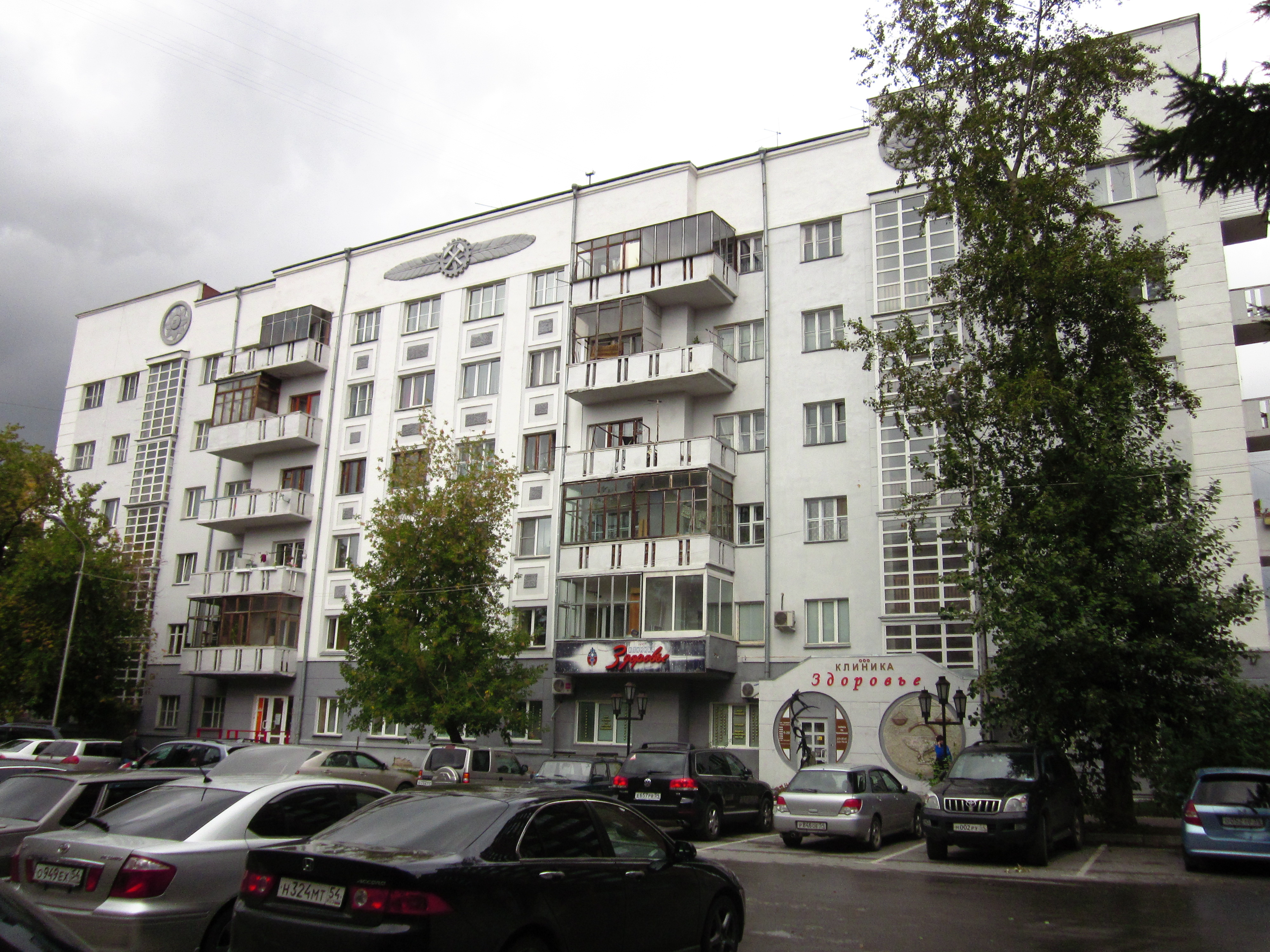
- Interactive map of the Soyuzzoloto House area

General information
- Architectural style: constructivism
- Location: Novosibirsk, Russia
- Completed: 1932

Design and construction
- Architects: A. I. Bobrov; B. A. Gordeyev

Soyuzzoloto Residential House (Russian: Жилой дом «Союззолото») is a constructivist building in Tsentralny City District of Novosibirsk, Russia. It is located on the corner of Kamenskaya and Oktyabrskaya streets. The building was constructed in 1932. Architects: A. I. Bobrov, B. A. Gordeyev.

== History ==
The building was built by A. I. Bobrov and was reconstructed by B. A. Gordeyev in the following years.

== See also ==
- Aeroflot House
- Polyclinic No. 1
- Rabochaya Pyatiletka
