= Chaplygin Street, Novosibirsk =

Street in Novosibirsk, Russia

Chaplygin Street
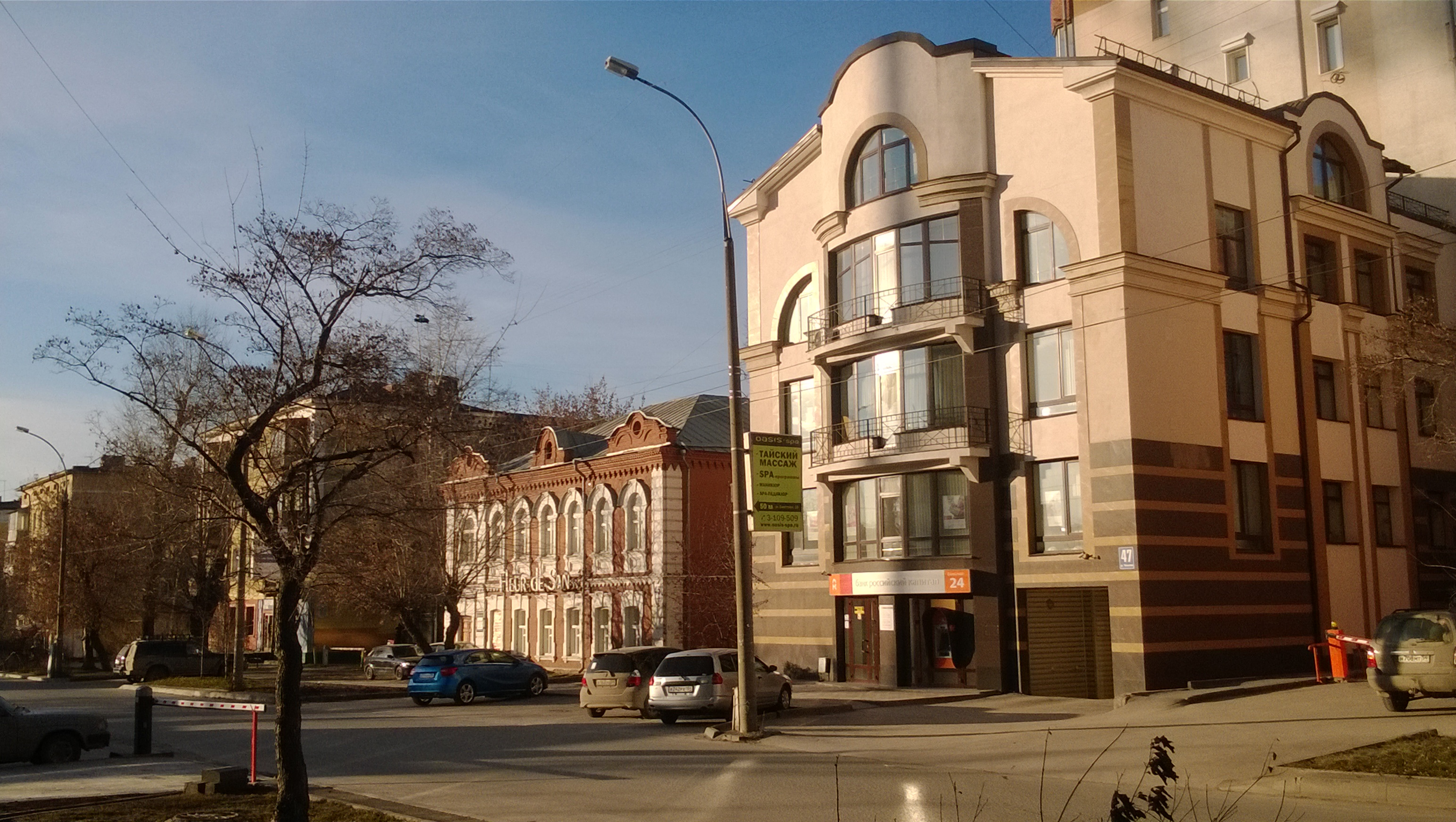
- Native name: Улица Чаплыгина (Russian)
- Location: Novosibirsk; Russia

Chaplygin Street (Russian: Улица Чаплыгина) is a street in Zheleznodorozhny and Tsentralny districts of Novosibirsk, Russia. The street consists of two fragments. The first street fragment starts from the Street of Revolution, crosses Uritsky, Sovetskaya streets and forms a T-intersection with Krasny Avenue. The second fragment starts from Serebrennikovskaya Street crosses Kamenskaya Street and ends in a city block.

== History ==
Until 1920 the street was named the Asinkritovskaya, in honor of Asinkrit Lomachevsky, Governor of the Tomsk Governorate, later it was called the Rabochaya Street, and afterwards, the street was named in honor of Sergey Chaplygin.

== Architecture ==
=== Tsarist period ===
- The Runin House. The building was built in 1903. The house belonged to the Runin, merchant, who sold tea and sugar.
- Chaplygin Street 27. The building was built in the early 1900s.
- Chaplygin Street 29. The building was constructed in the early 1900s.
- The Women's Gymnasium of P. A. Smirnova. The building was built in the early 20th century.
- House with the Mezzanine. The building was built in the early 1900s
- The Profitable House (Chaplygin Street 45) is a two-story building built in the 1910s.
- The Profitable House (Chaplygin Street 53) is a three-story building built in the 1910s.
- Chaplygin Street 65 is a two-story wooden building built in the beginning of the 20th century.
- The Buzolina House (Pharmacy No. 2) is a building on the corner of Chaplygin Street and Krasny Avenue. It was built in the early 20th century. The house belonged to Nadezhda Buzolina. Since 1913 the building has been occupied by the pharmacy, the oldest pharmacy of the city.
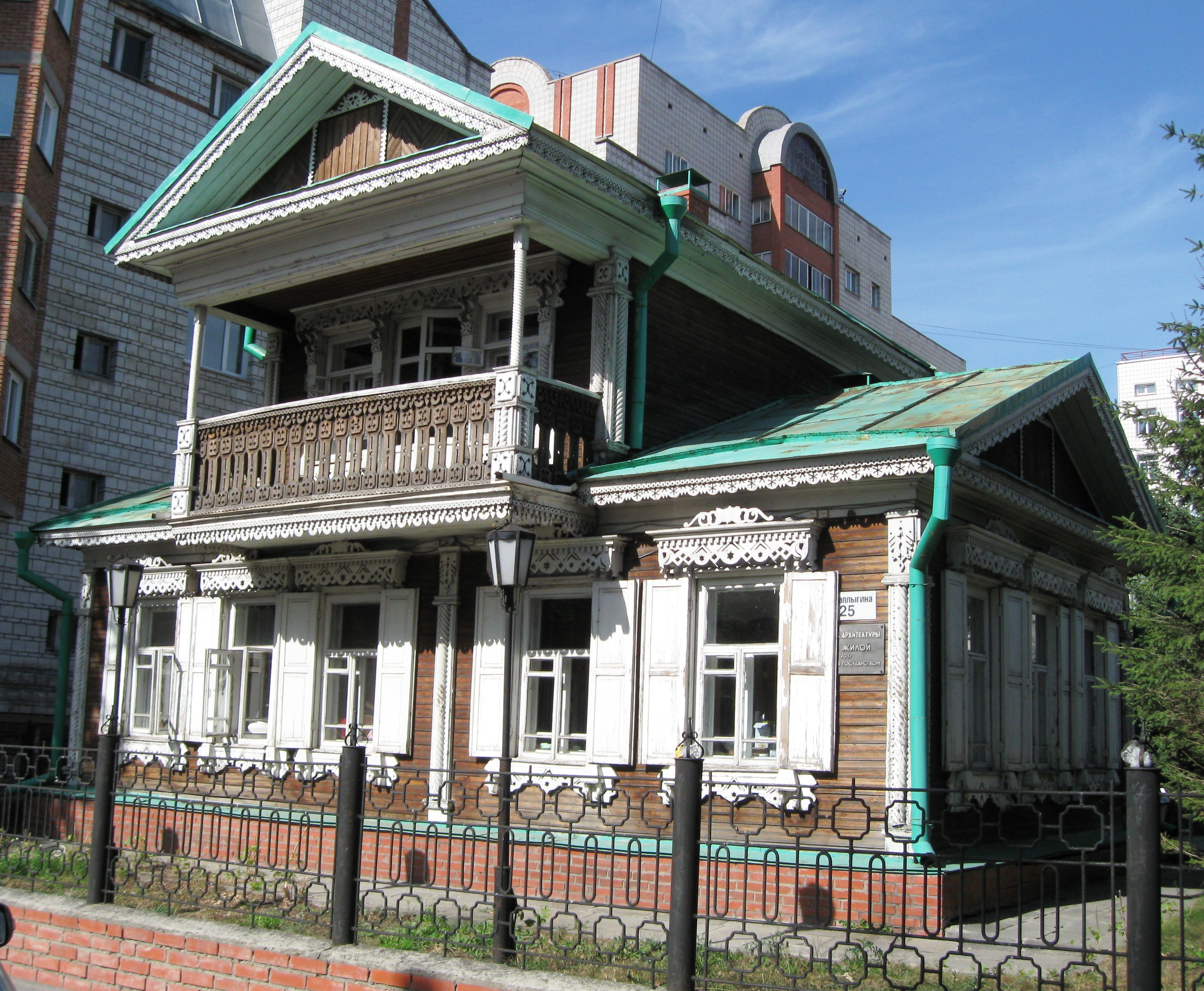
Chaplygin Street 25

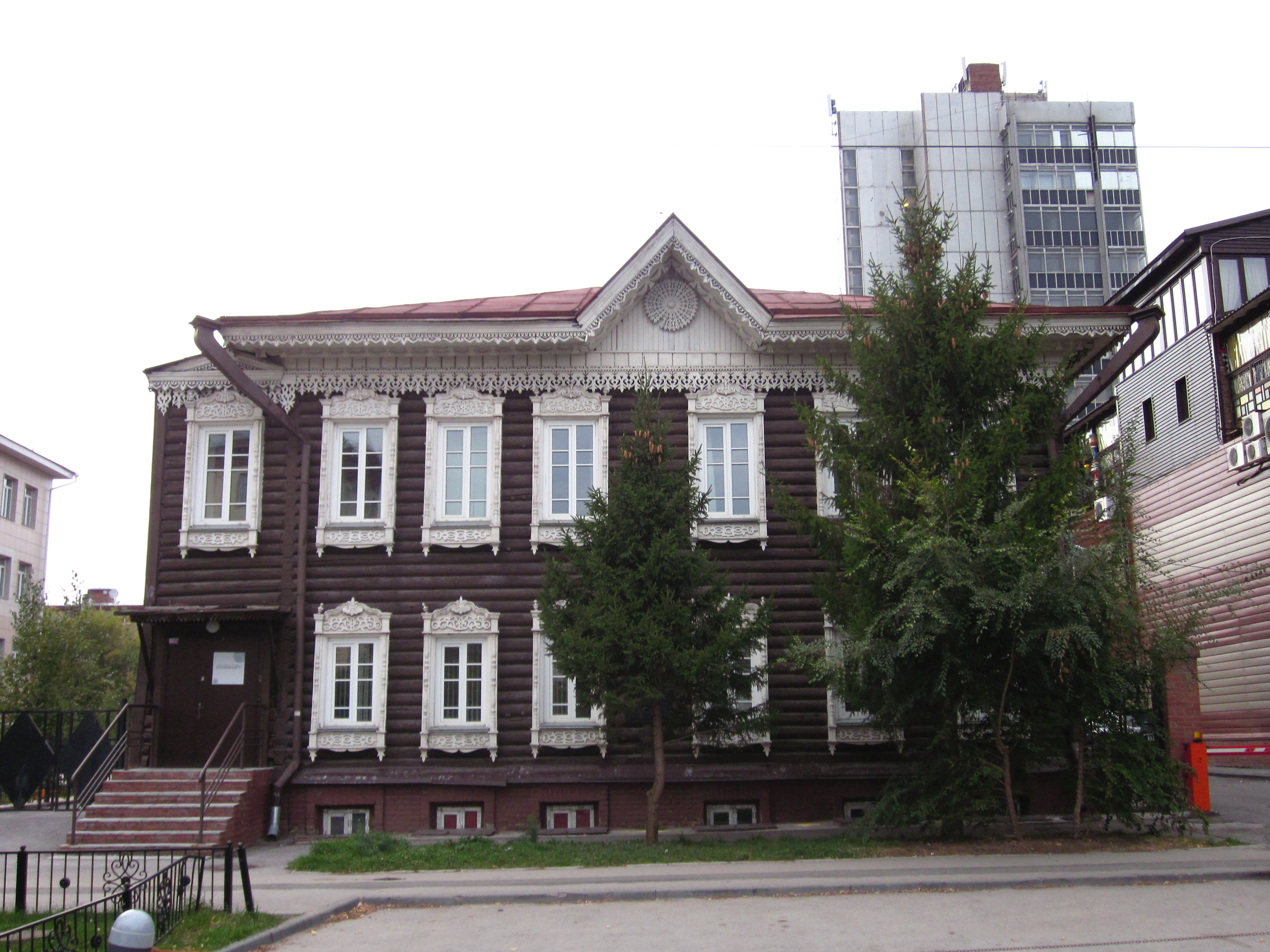
Chaplygin Street 65

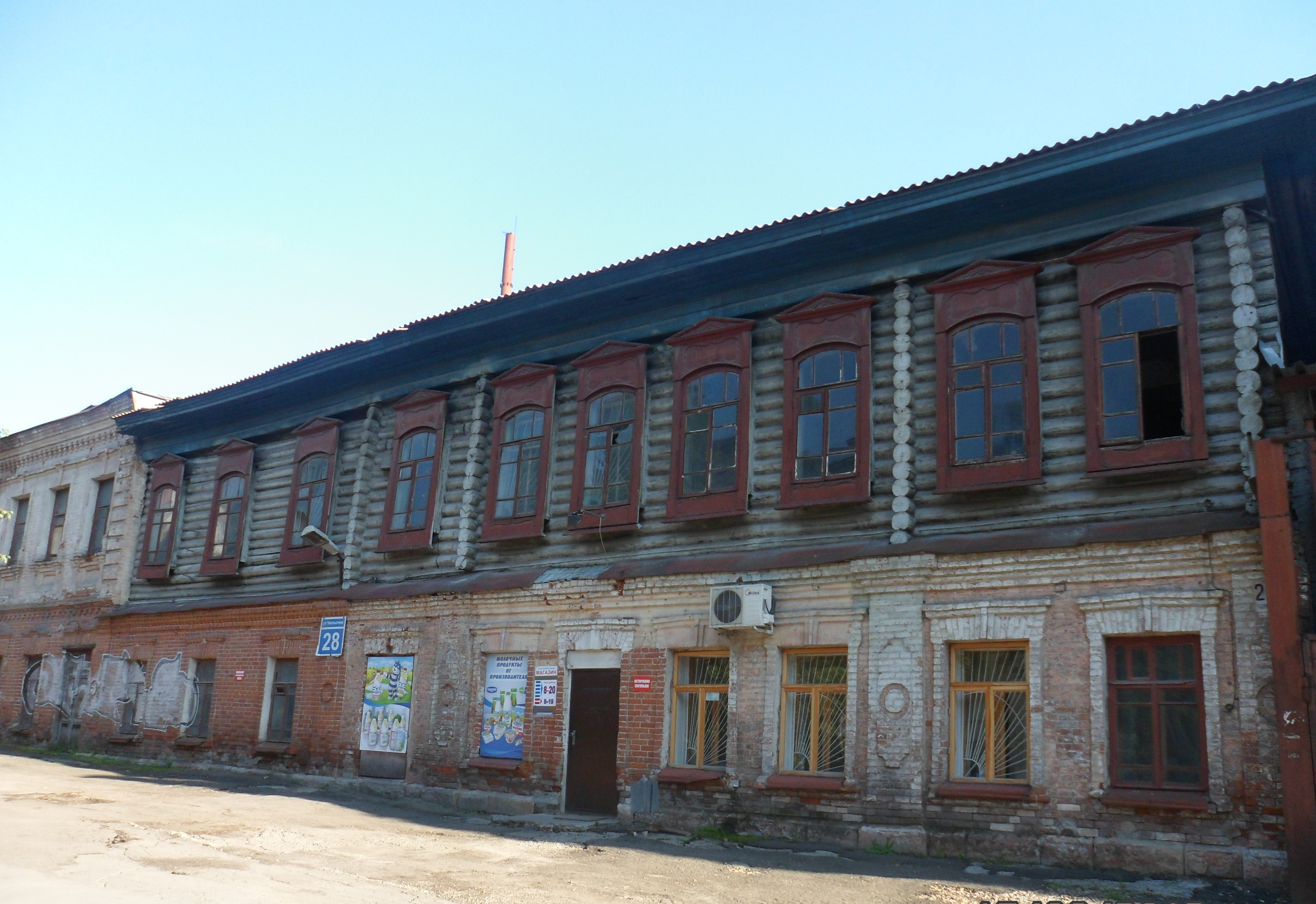
Women's Gymnasium of P. A. Smirnova

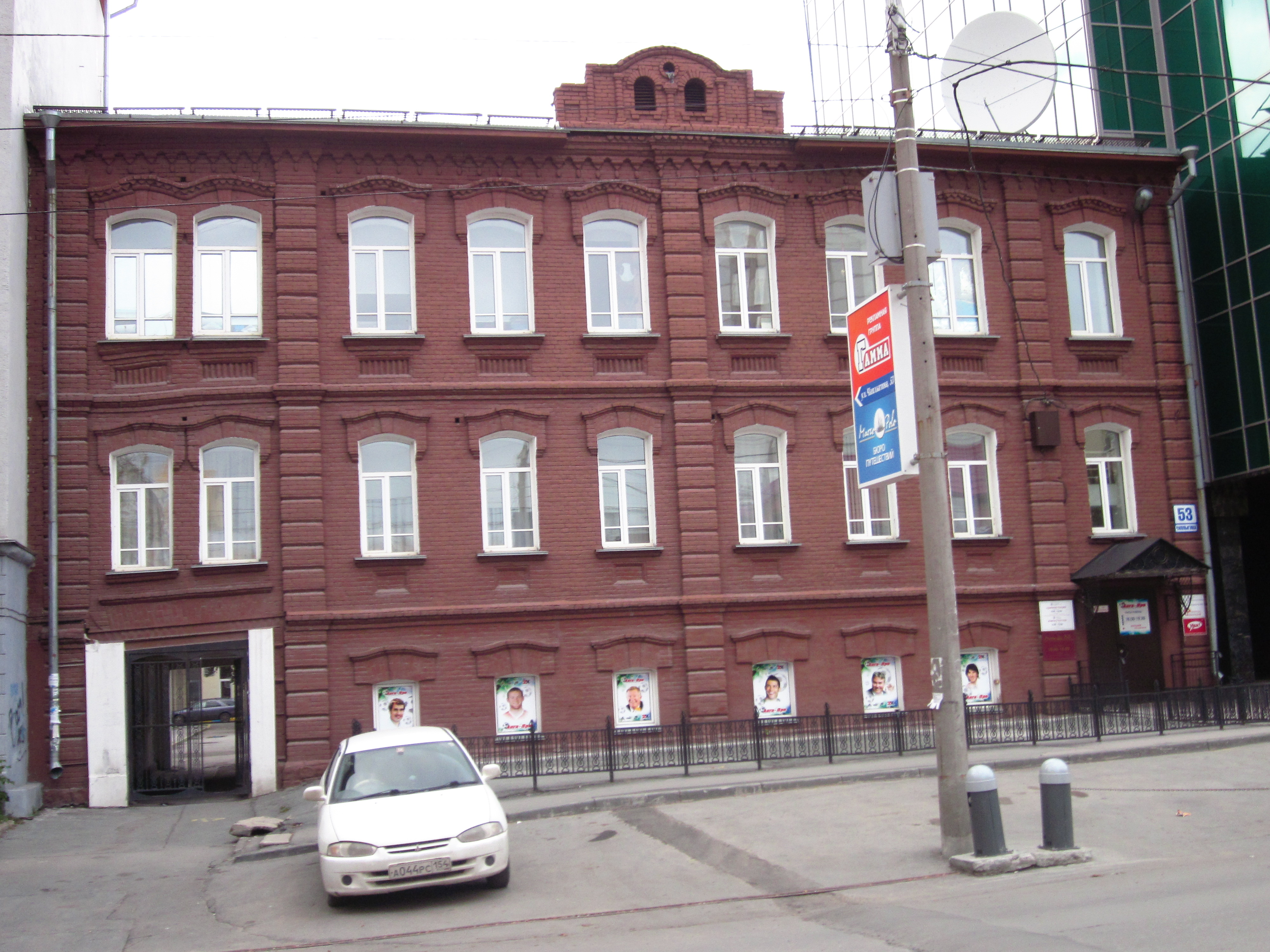
Chaplygin Street 53

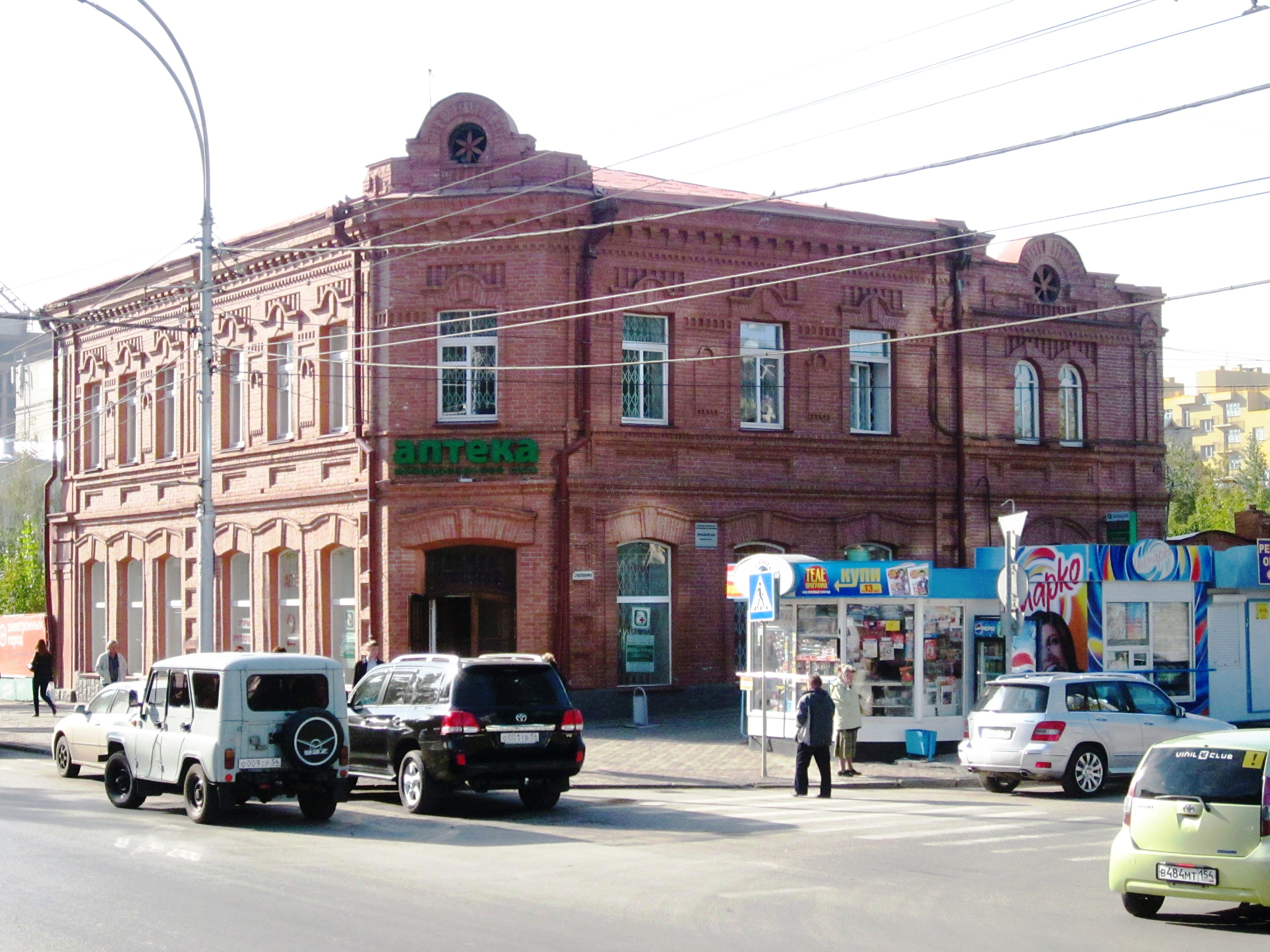
The Buzolina House

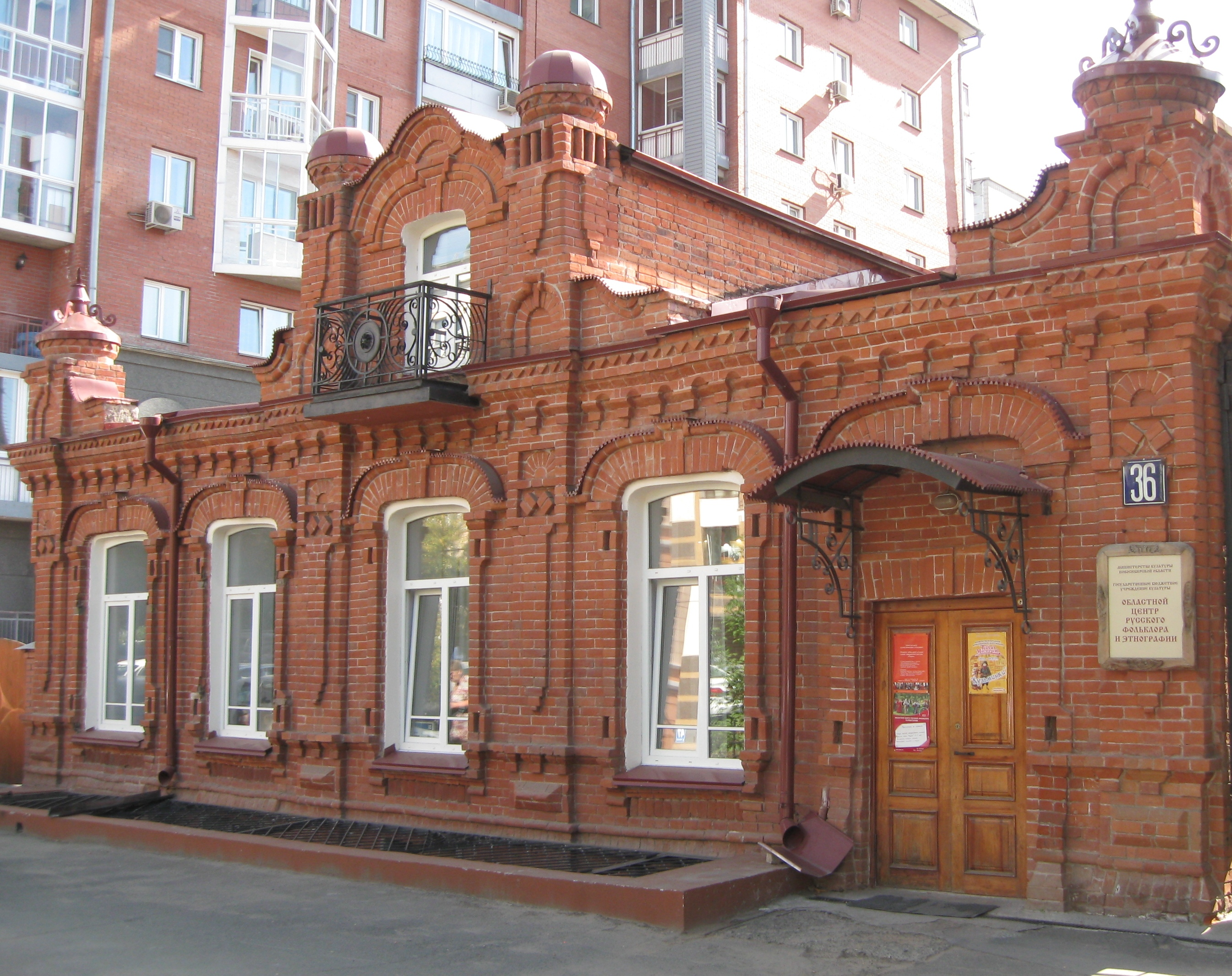
House with the Mezzanine

=== Soviet period ===
- The Hospital. The building was built in 1926.
- Rabochaya Pyatiletka is a zig zag building built in the 1930s
- Chaplygin Street 51 is a residential building built in the late 1950s.
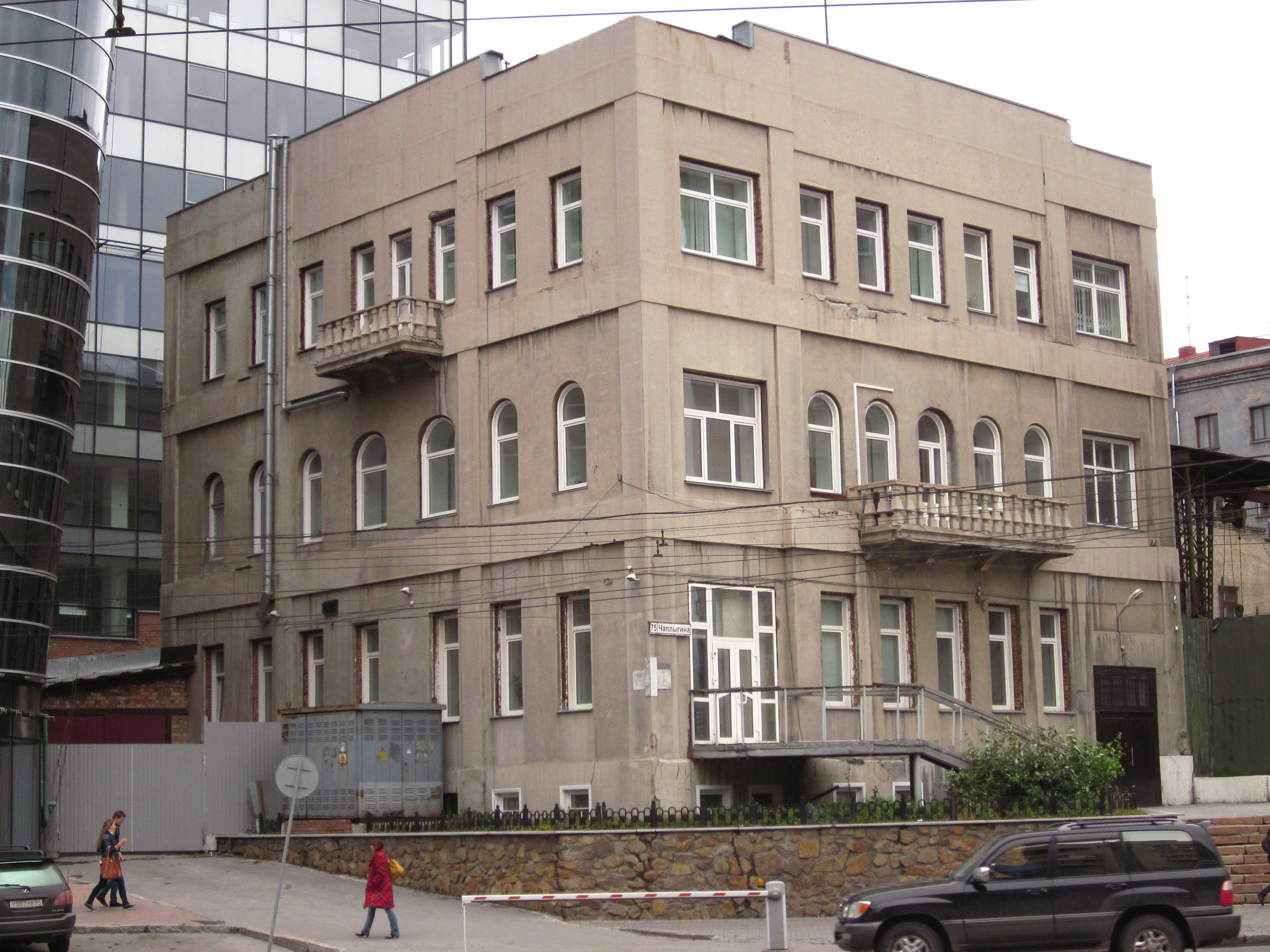
Chaplygin Street 75

=== Post-Soviet period ===
- Buton Business Center is a glass building on the corner of Chaplygin Street and Krasny Avenue. It was built in 2012.
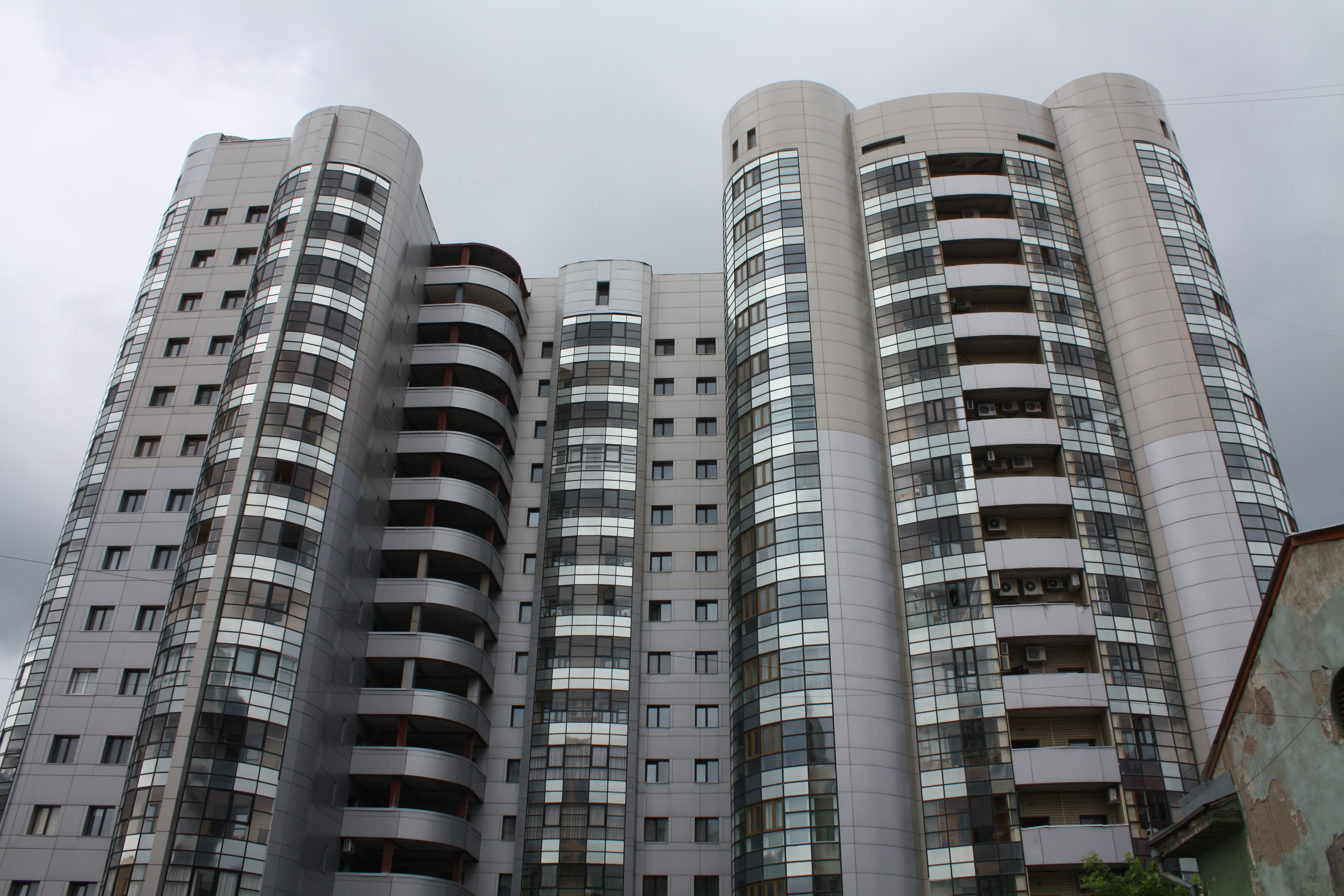

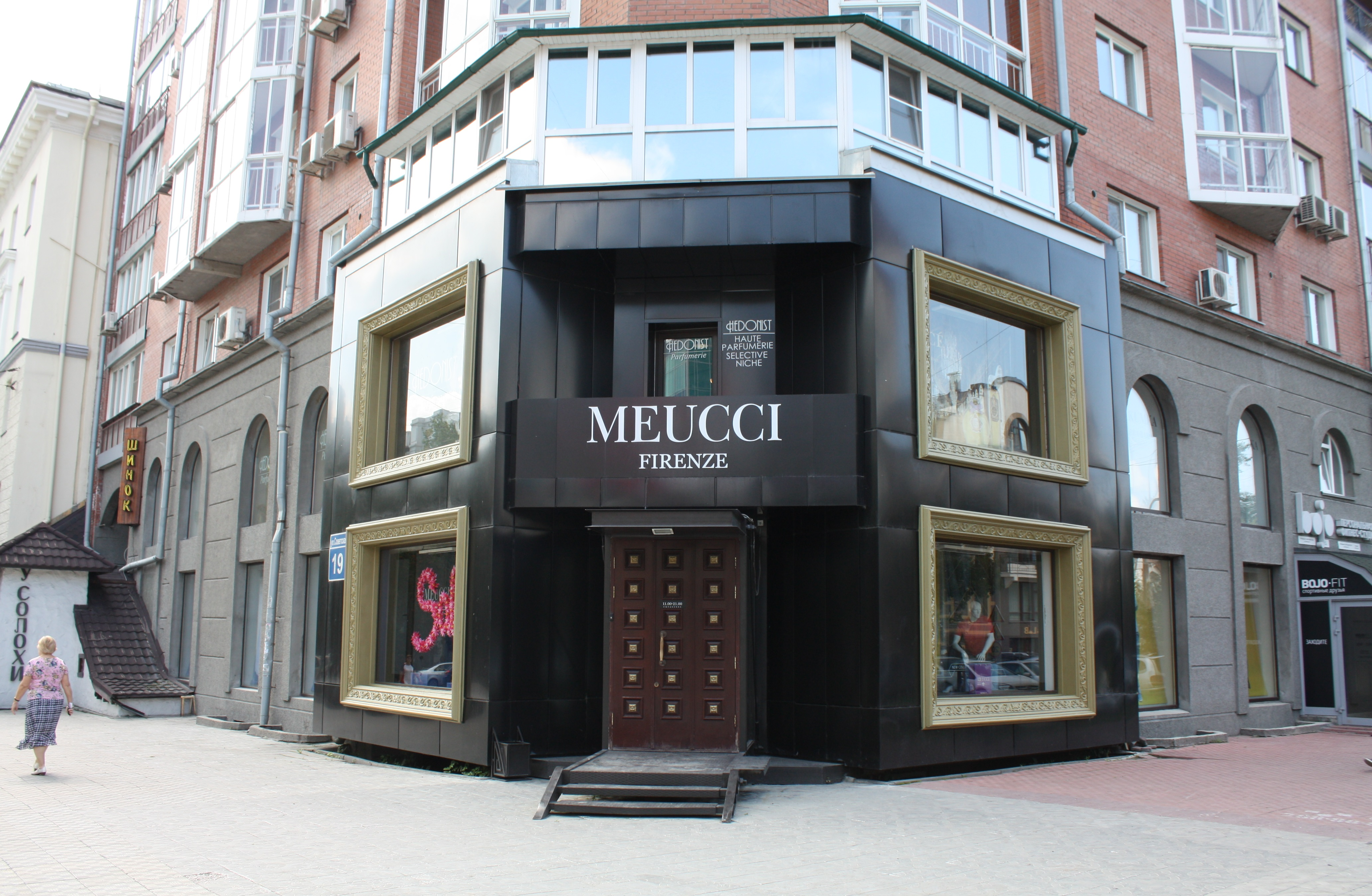

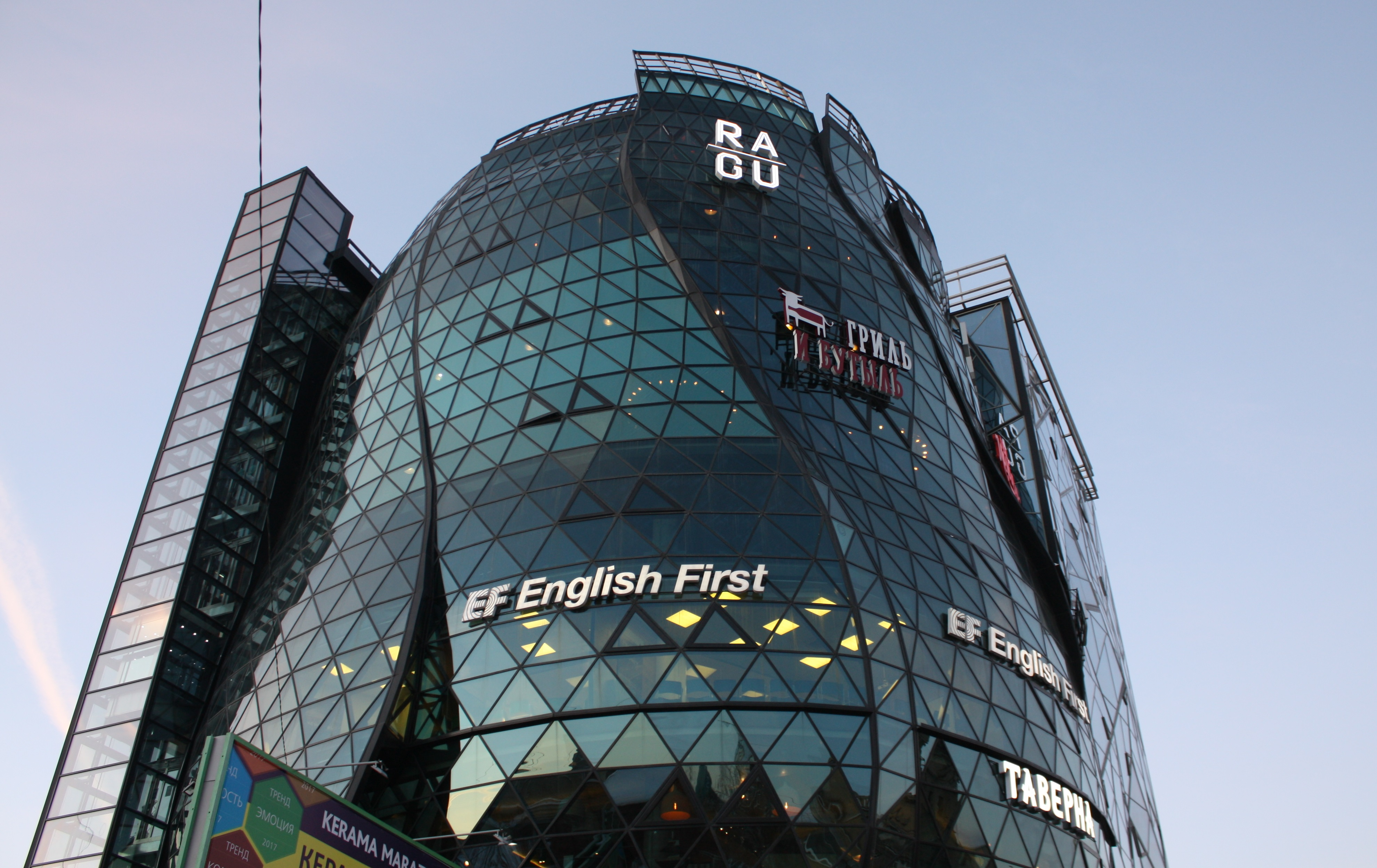
Buton Business Center

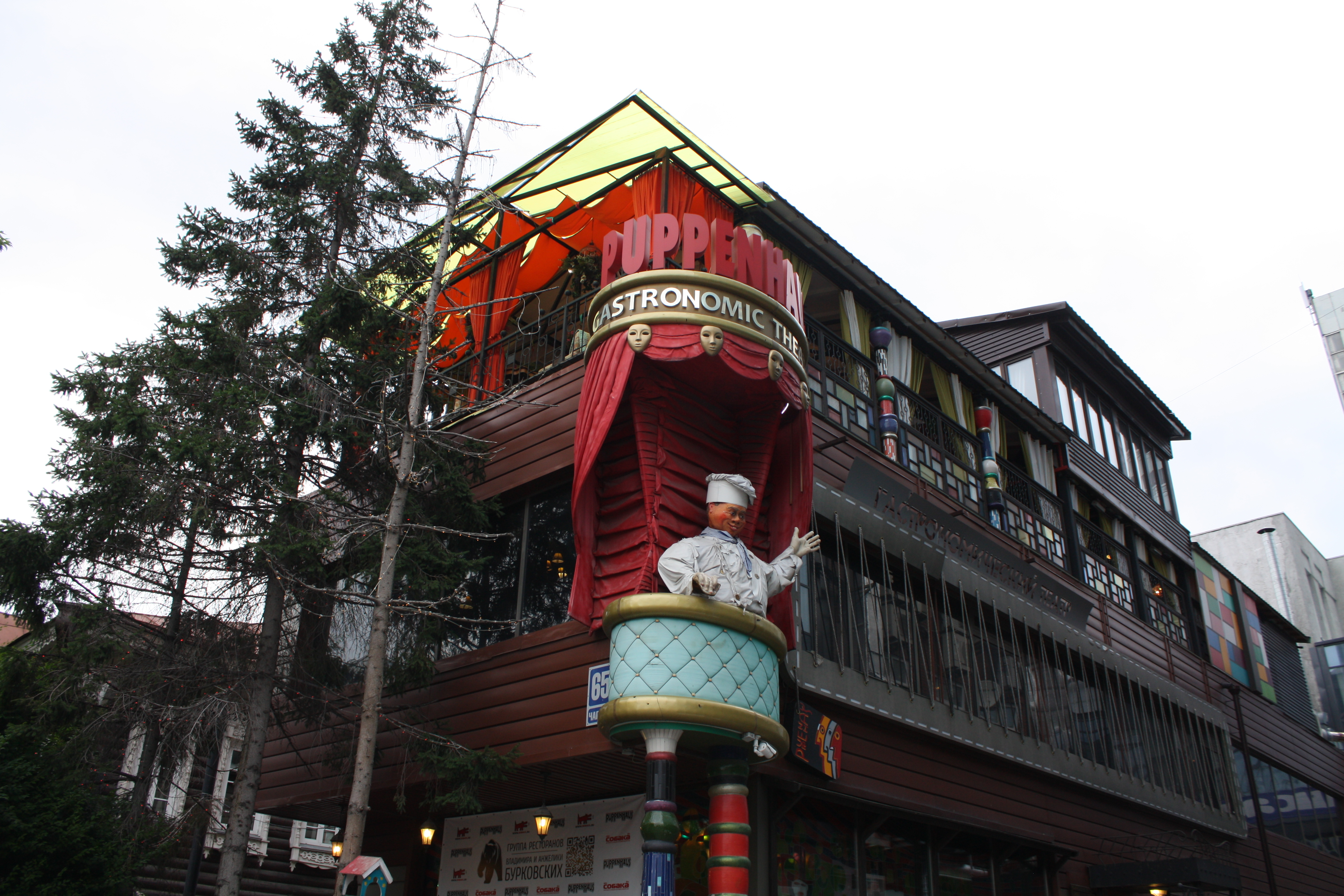

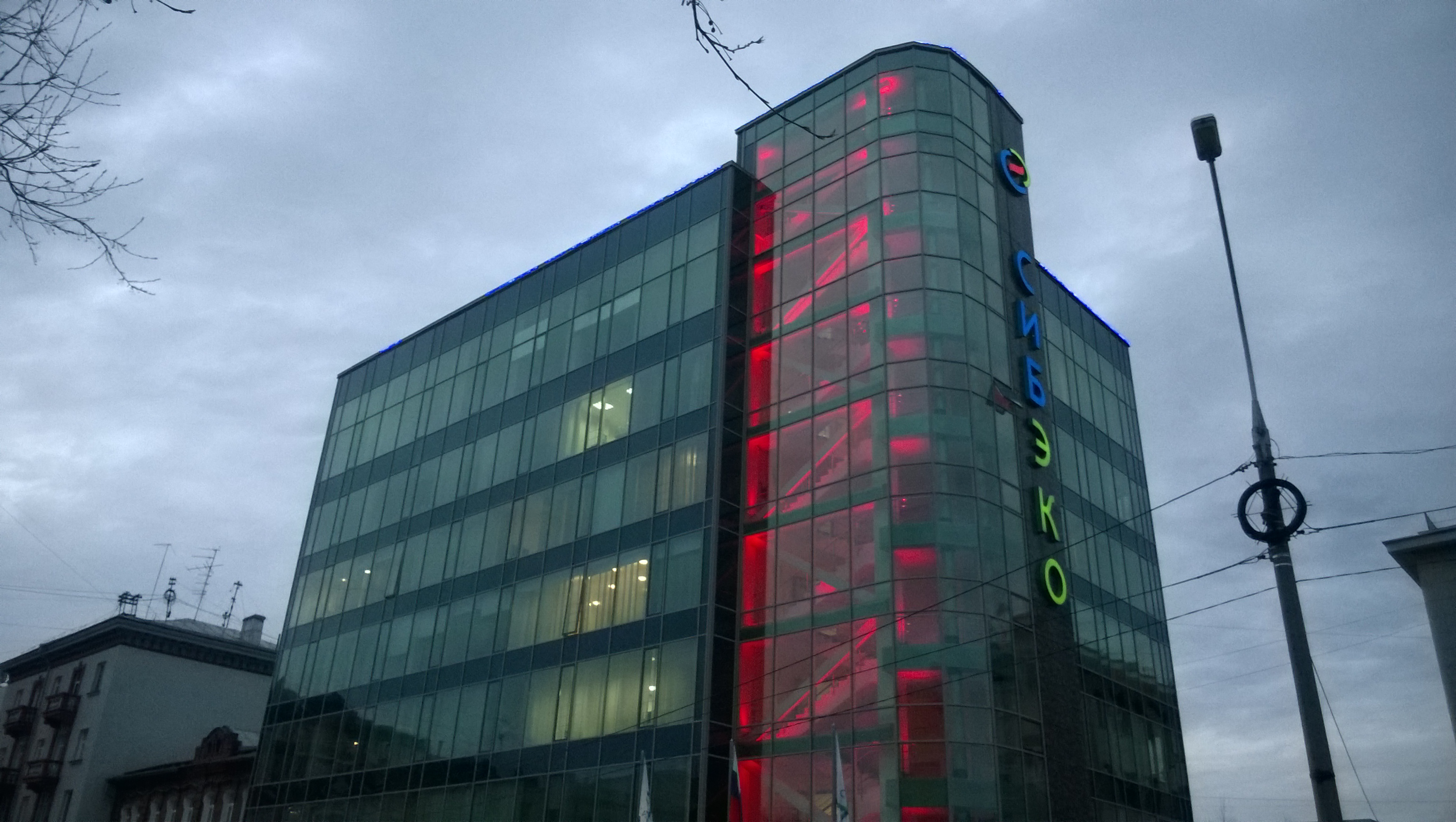
Sibeco

== Gallery ==
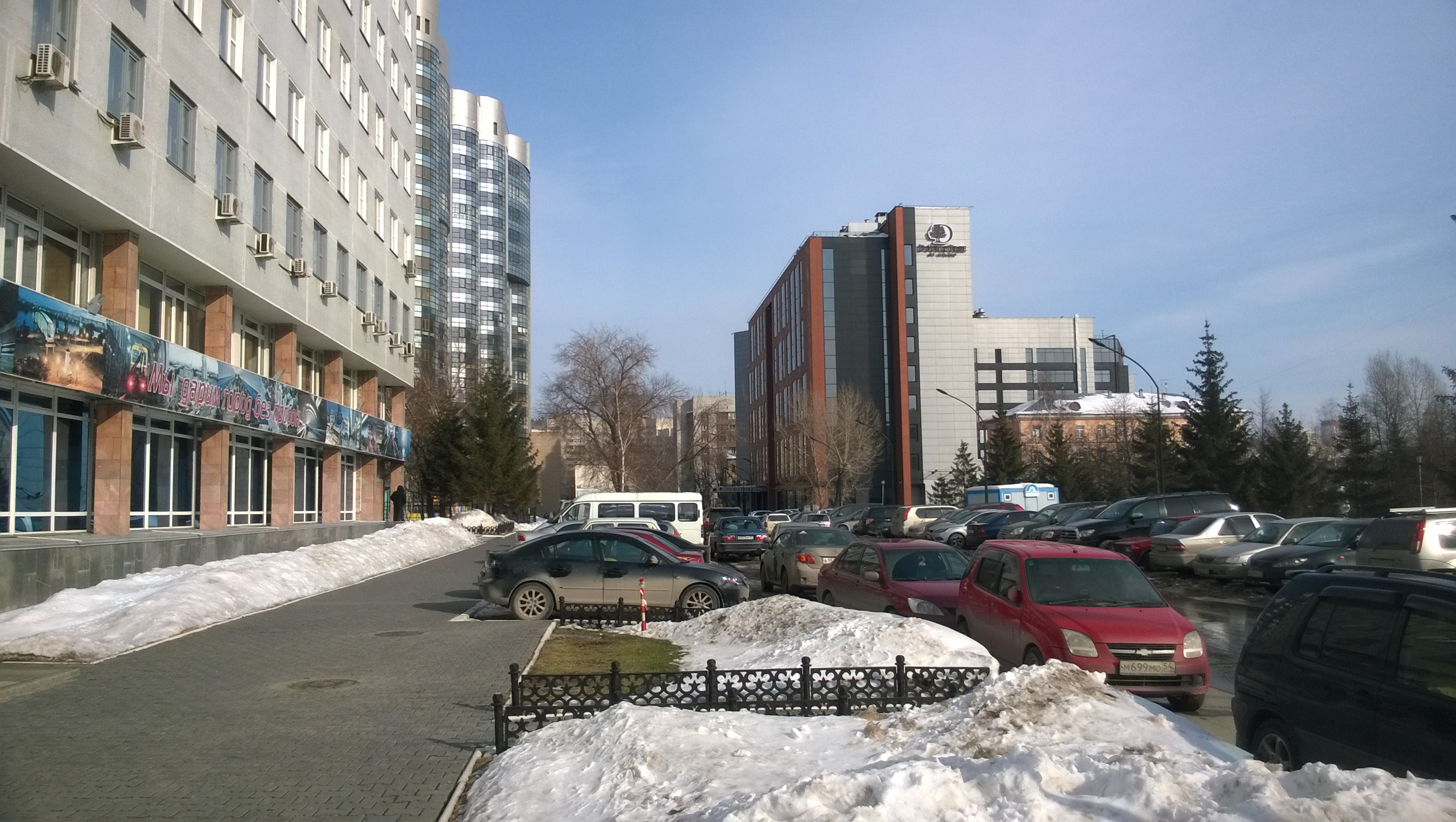

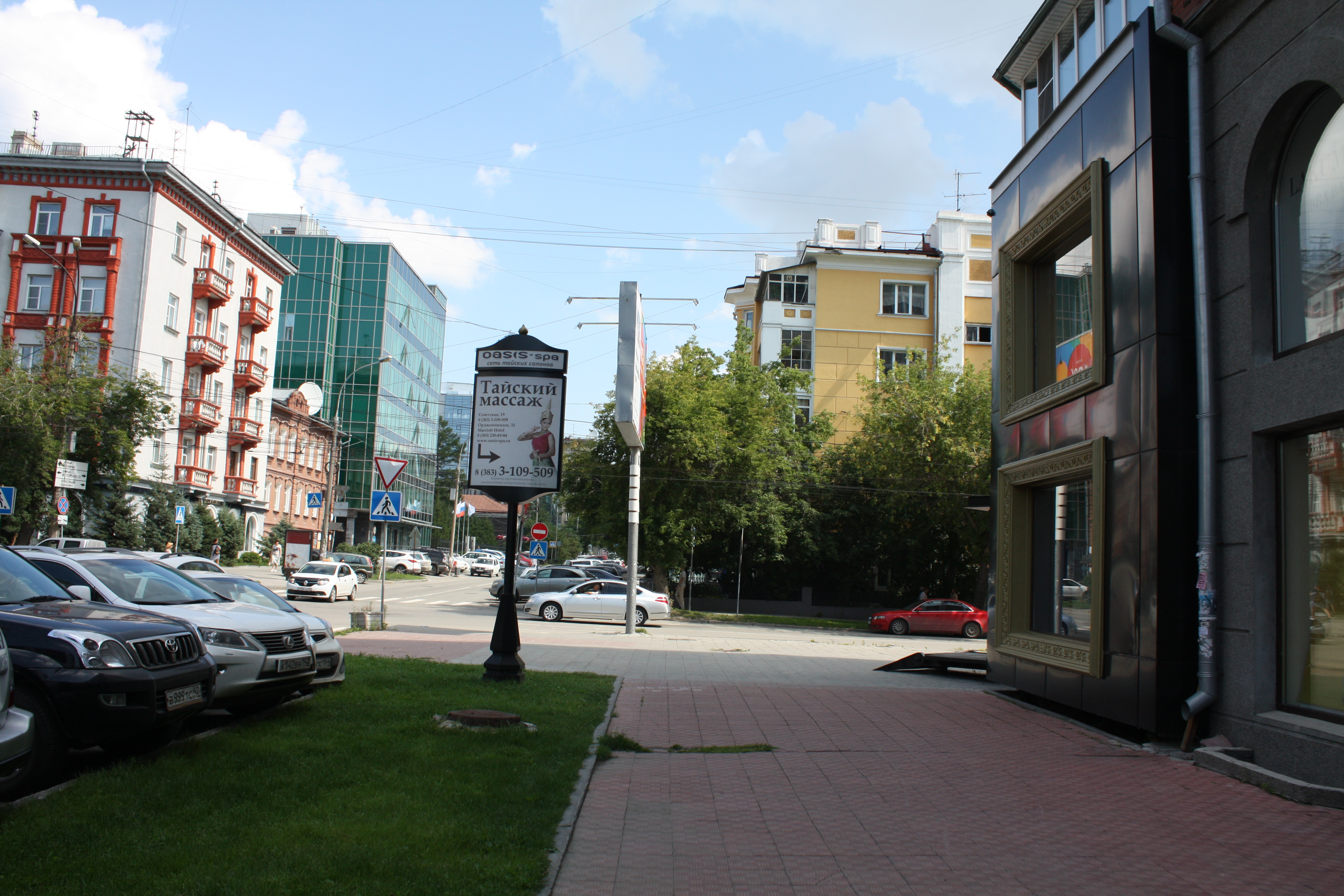

== Notable residents ==
- Vitaly Mukha (1936–2005) was the head of Novosibirsk Oblast (from 1991 to 1993 and from 1995 to 1999). He lived in the Chaplygin Street 100.
- Vitaly Suvernev (1919–2000) was a Soviet and Russian scientists in the field of aerodynamics, director of the SibNIA from 1959 to 1989. He lived in the Chaplygin Street 45 (1945–2000).
