= Nikolai Yadrintsev =

Russian explorer and archaeologist (1842–1897)

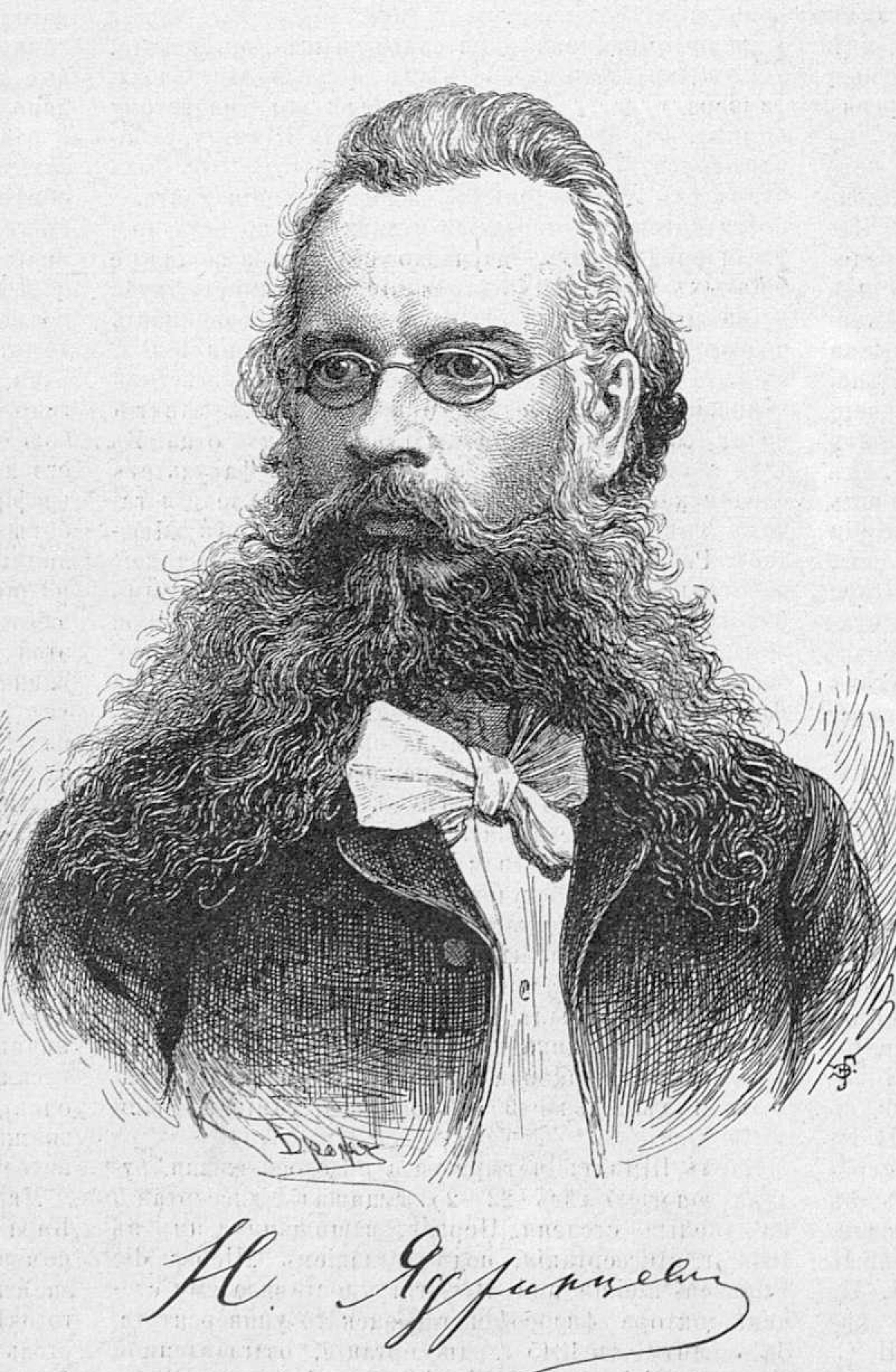
Nikolai Yadrintsev

Nikolai Mikhailovich Yadrintsev (Russian: Николай Михайлович Ядринцев; October 18, 1842, Omsk – June 7, 1894, Barnaul) was a Russian public figure, explorer, archaeologist, and Turkologist. His discoveries include the Orkhon script, Genghis Khan's capital, Karakorum and Ordu-Baliq, the capital of the Uyghur Khaganate. He was also one of the founding figures of Siberian regionalism.

== Biography ==
Nikolai Yadrintsev was born into the family of an Omsk merchant. After Tomsk gymnasium, he matriculated at Petersburg University. There he began his active public work. In 1860, together with his friend and soul-mate G. N. Potanin, Yadrintsev organized a group of Siberian students with members S. S. Shashkov, N. I. Naumov, I. V. Omulevsky, I. A. Khudyakov, Ch. Valihanov and others, future outstanding writers and scientists. The social movement of the 1860s captivated the members of the Siberian countrymen. They established connections with democratic revolutionaries, read forbidden literature, and participated in student revolts, which resulted in their arrest. During those years, the journal "Spark" (Russian "Iskra"), a clone of "Contemporary", printed its first indicting feuilletons of N. Yadrintsev. In the 1860s Yadrintsev became a committed democrat.

The members of Russian-Siberian community took close to their hearts the needs of their native land, transformed by czarism into a colony, and decided to selflessly struggle for the development of the Siberian fringes, against its subjugated position. The movement started by N. Yadrintsev and G .N. Potanin received a name "Siberian patriotism" or "Siberian separatism". They believed that only Siberians can protect the interests of Siberia, the purpose and obligation of all Siberians they saw only in the service to their land. They raised the inevitability of separation of Siberia from Russia, and in their leaflet they called on the fellow countrymen to rise and create in Siberia an independent democratic republic.

In 1862-1863 the members of the Siberian community, interrupting their studies, departed to the Siberian cities to advance their ideas. Their appeal did not meet a fervent response, but their oral and printed campaign against imperial authorities and oppressors of Siberia, for the revival and education of a native territory were supported by progressive part of the Siberian public, especially youth. A number of articles, feuilletons, and speeches of N. Yadrintsev with sharp condemnation of the defects of the local possessor class and functionaries of administration belongs to that time. N. Yadrintsev passionately appealed to open a university in Siberia, and started a campaign gathering donations for the university, which continued for over 20 years. In 1880 in Tomsk was initiated, and in 1888 opened the first Russian university in Siberia.

The Siberian separatists alarmed the government, they were arrested in 1865. During investigation, N. Yadrintsev spent three years in prison in his native Omsk. In 1868 the "Siberian separatists" N. Yadrintsev, G. N. Potanin and other Siberian patriots were sentenced to forced labor and exile. N. Yadrintsev was sent to Shenkursk in the Arkhangelsk region, where he spent five years in exile (1868-1873) in relentless work on self-education, study of history, Siberian problems, development of main principles of Siberian separatism. There, he became acquainted with the writings of Karl Marx and, though he did not become a Marxist, he adopted some of its positions. He was publishing essays, articles and feuilletons in "Business", "Domestic Notes", "Week", "Volga-Kama newspaper" and other liberal periodicals. In Shenkursk in 1872 he authored his first monograph "Russian community in prison and exile", which brought wide popularity to the author and his progressive ideological and scientific positions.

In 1873 Yadrintsev's sentence was "most mercifully" commuted by the Czar, and Yadrintsev left for Saint Petersburg, and then to Omsk, where he entered state service and lived until 1881. In Omsk Yadrintsev collected contemporary records on various scientific and social problems of the "aliens" (indigenous peoples in Russian colonial parlance), peasants, and migrants. From Omsk, under a contract with the Russian Geographical Society, he traveled twice across Siberia and the Altai, researching economy and geography, archaeology and ethnography, anthropology and linguistics. During his travels in the Altai in 1878-1880, Yadrintsev collected data about kurgans, fortresses and other archaeological monuments, recorded legends about some of them, and produced sketches of many archaeological finds. These materials were published by the Moscow Archaeological Society. For the results of his scientific travel, N.Yadrintsev was awarded a gold medal by the Russian Geographical Society.

In 1881 Yadrintsev moved to St. Petersburg, where he remained until 1887. From the materials collected in Siberia, he wrote a monograph "Siberia as a Colony" which was taken in Russia as a most monumental work of Siberian literature, and an encyclopedia of Siberian life. In this book, the author developed main the principles of what came to be known as Siberian separatism.

In 1881 Yadrintsev began publishing a newspaper, "Eastern Review," with a democratic orientation. The articles, feuilletons, and reports were warmly greeted by ordinary ethnic Russian people, who were suffering from the arbitrariness of local authorities and exploitation. Many authors were political exiles. They were exposing the Siberian rulers, and disclosing machinations. The newspaper gained immediate popularity in Siberia, and became a recognized leader of the Siberian press, but within the Siberian administration and local moneymen it ignited hatred and rage. The newspaper promoted awakening and development of public consciousness of the Siberian Russian intelligentsia and other populations. It supported expansion of the rights of the rural and city autonomies, freedom of press and public life, reorganization of the primitive school system, publicity in the jury court system. By the 1880s, Yadrintsev was publishing articles not only in the "Eastern Review", but also in dozens of other outlets including "European Bulletin", "Domestic Notes", "Russian Register", "Business", etc. Nikolai Yadrintsev's name became known throughout progressive Russia, and he established connections with the "Freedom of Labor" group in Geneva. In 1888 the publication of "Eastern Review" was moved from St. Petersburg to Irkutsk, closer to its audience, with Yadrintsev remaining in the capital.

Yadrintsev worked to speed up the development of the backward fringe of the Russian empire. He hoped to awaken "local patriotism" in various layers of the Siberian population and, first, among the small ethnically Russian Siberian intelligentsia, which would help to improve the governance and enlightenment of Siberia and to lead it to prosperity. But as the years passed, the number of Siberian patriots did not increase and Siberia remained in a sad position. Yadrintsev was especially depressed by the growth of the Siberian moneyed elite. Professing the "People's Will" ideas, he hoped that Siberia would leapfrog over a capitalist stage.

In 1889, under contract with the Russian Geographical Society, Yadrintsev traveled to Mongolia, where he located the remains of the Early Medieval city Hara - Balgas and the ancient Mongolian capital Karakorum. In the Kosho-Tsaidam gorge (valley of the Orkhon river) Yadrintsev found two petroglyphic monuments with runiform writing of the ancient Türks of the 6-8th centuries, later decoded by the Danish scientist W. Tomsen. These discoveries brought Yadrintsev world fame, and became one of the greatest scientific sensations of the 19th century. In quick succession, already in 1891 was organized a follow-up Orkhon expedition of the Russian Academy of Sciences with participation of Yadrintsev, led by an ethnically German native from Barnaul, a recognized Turkologist academician W. W. Radloff. The Orkhon expedition found more monuments of runiform writing with epitaphs of the Türkic khagans and other nobility. The results of the expedition were published by Radloff in his "Atlas of Mongolian Antiquities" (1892-1893) and in a special collection of works of the Orkhon expedition (1892).

In 1891 Yadrintsev published his third monograph, "Siberian Aliens, their Life and Modern Status", supplementing his book "Siberia as a Colony". With graphic actual material, the book depicted the distressed state of the Siberian nations, existing in poverty and ignorance, ruthlessly oppressed by tsarism and Russian capitalists. At the same time, Yadrintsev highly valued the influence of Russian people on the transition of the Siberian nomads to settled agriculture, and their familiarization with Russian culture. The author displayed in his monograph his great humanity as a real friend and defender of the minority peoples of Siberia. Simultaneously, Yadrintsev published in Geneva a brochure "Illusion of Greatness and a Misery", ruthlessly criticizing the Russian autocracy.

In 1891-1892, Yadrintsev left St. Petersburg for Tobolsk province, where he assisted in the organization of assistance to the starving and those stricken by a cholera epidemic, to save the peasants and especially immigrants from Russia. In the early 1890s, Yadrintsev traveled to France and America to study migrant problems, with an eye toward assisting Russian migrants in Siberia. For practical realization of his plan, in 1894 Yadrintsev traveled to Barnaul, where, in his own words, he instigated a "peasant war" to protect Russian Altay farmers. There, on June 7, 1894 Nikolai Yadrintsev died. It as presumed he was committed suicide because of an unhappy love affair.

== Memorials ==
There are streets named after Yadrintsev in the Siberian cities of Omsk, Irkutsk, and Barnaul. Yadrintsevskaya Street in Novosibirsk also commemorates him.
