= Aeroflot House =

Building in Tsentralny, Novosibirsk, Russia

- Дом Аэрофлота
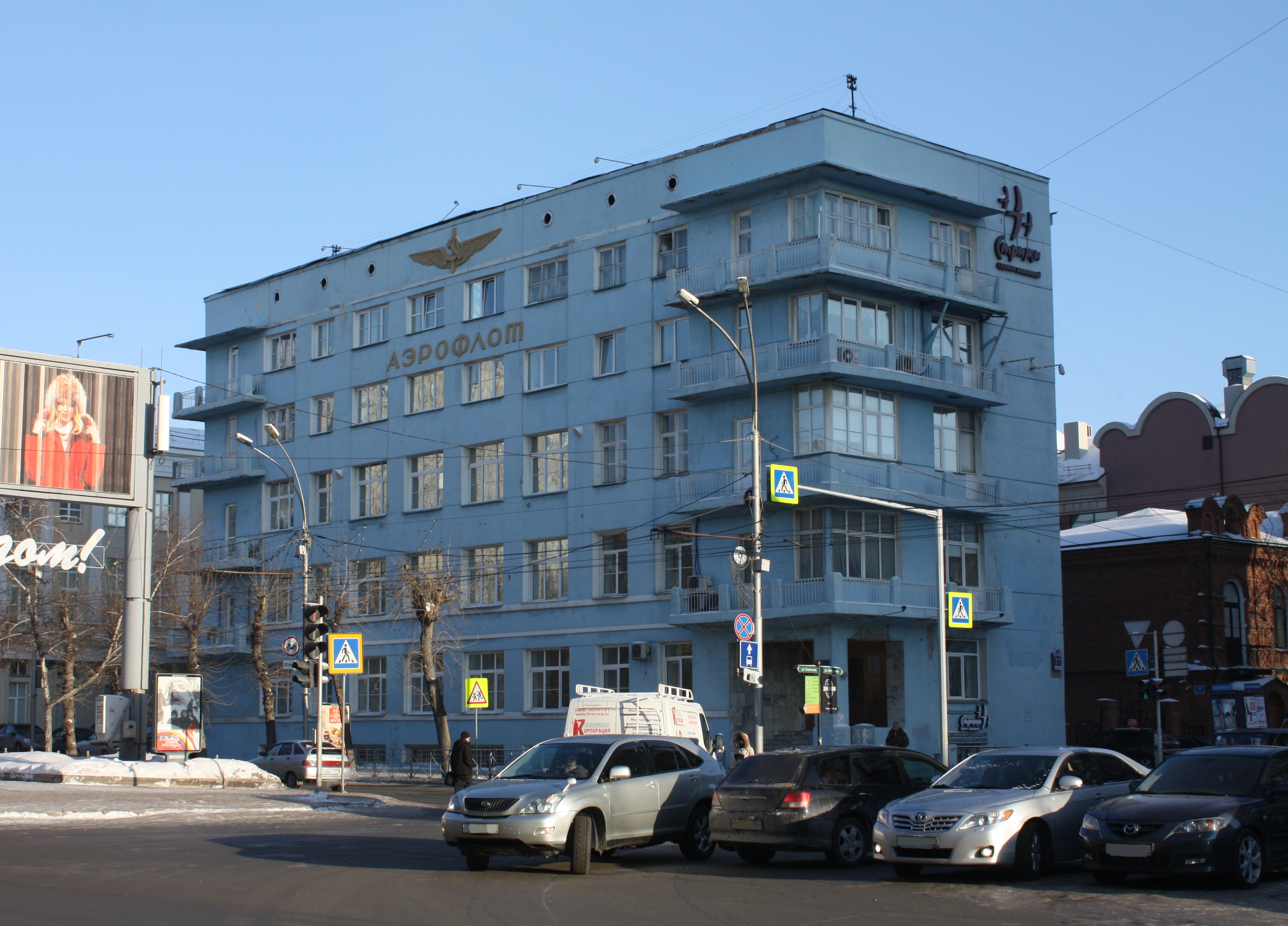

General information
- Architectural style: Constructivism
- Location: Novosibirsk, Russia
- Coordinates: 55.033135°N 82.920076°E
- Completed: 1930s

The Aeroflot House (Russian: Дом Аэрофлота) is a constructivist building in Tsentralny District of Novosibirsk, Russia. It is located on the corner of Krasny Avenue and Yadrintsevskaya Street. The building was built in the 1930s.

== History ==
The building was built for the Aeroflot. The architect is unknown.

The Aeroflot House is painted light blue.

== Gallery ==
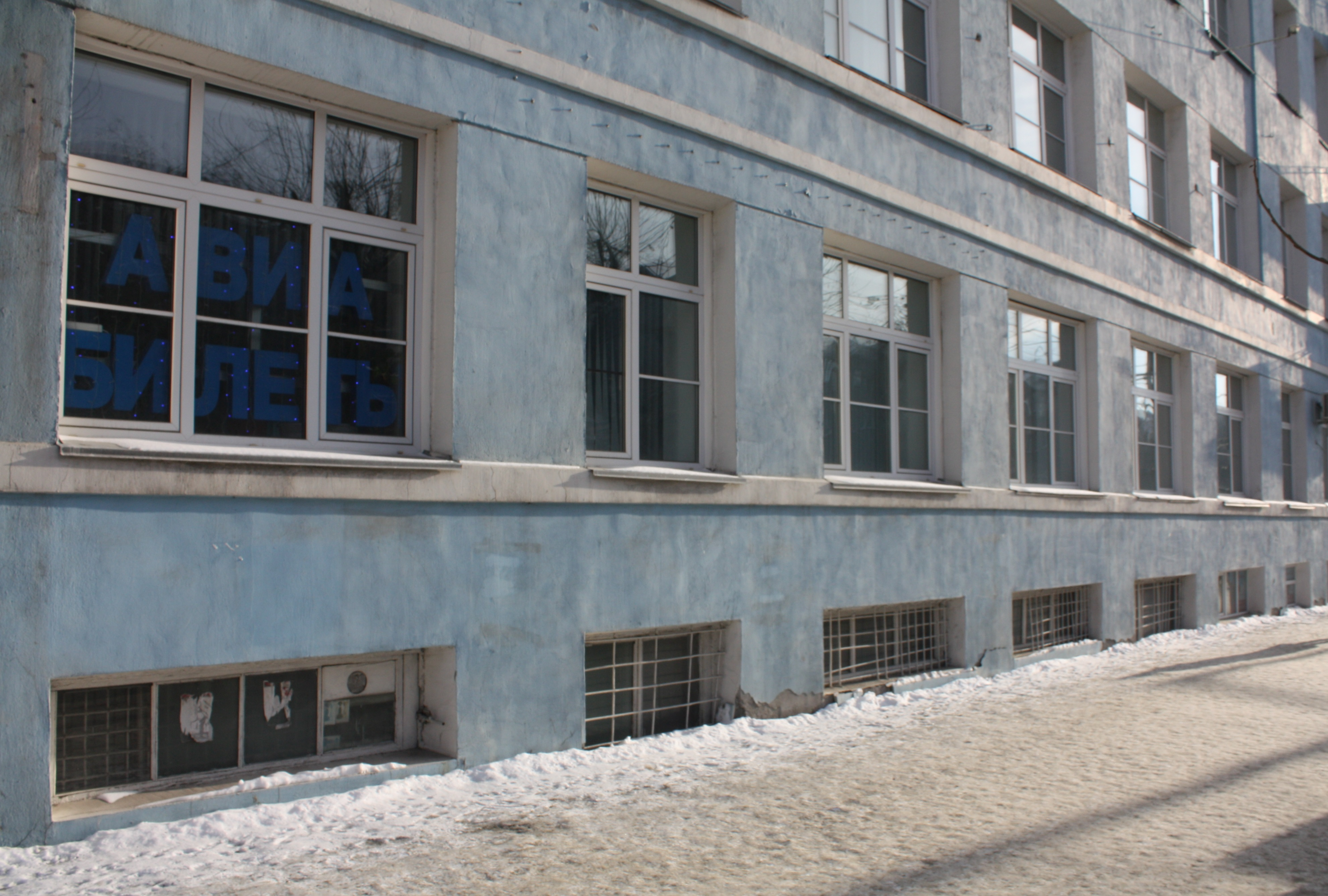

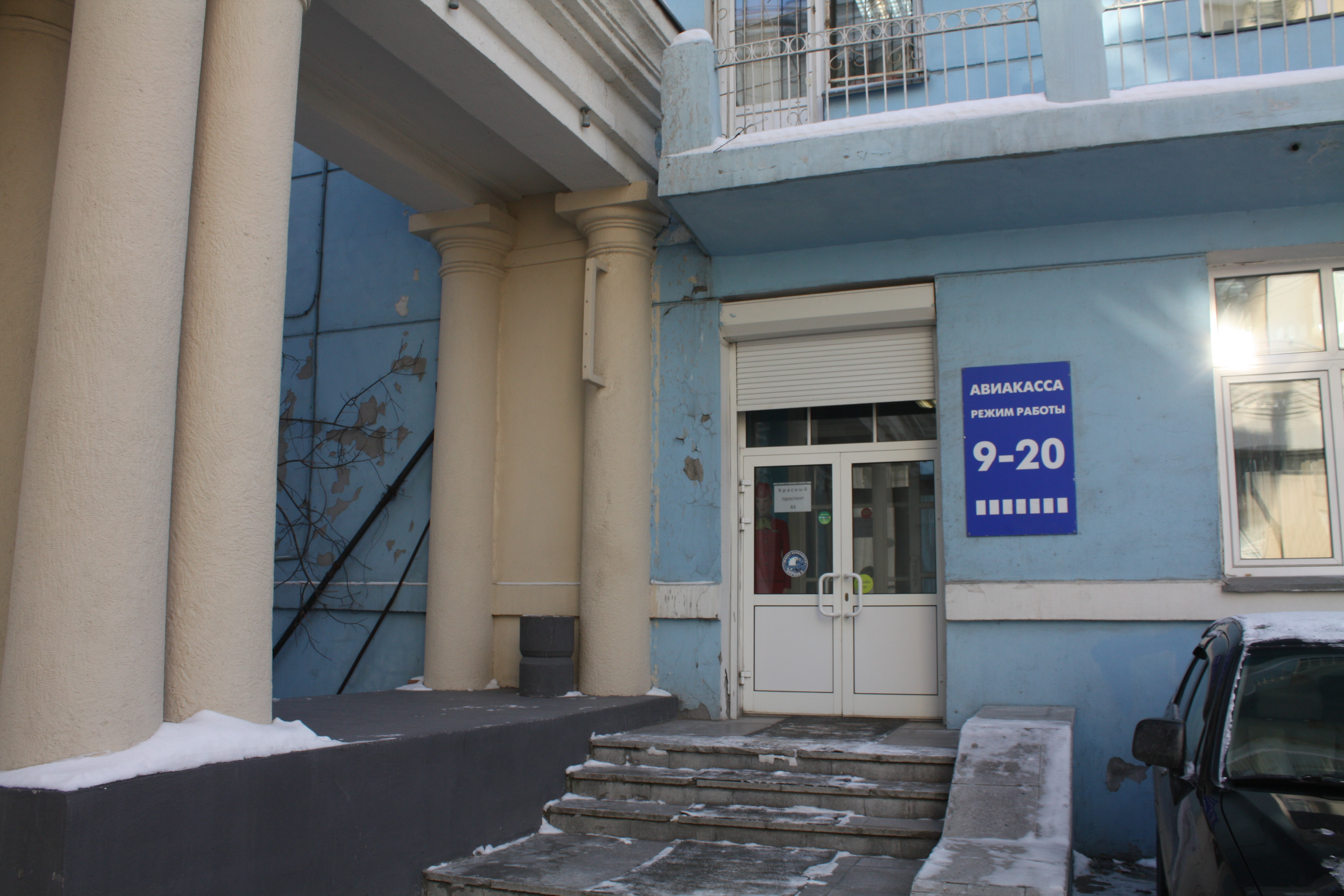
Entrance to air ticket offices.

== See also ==
- Polyclinic No. 1
- Gosbank Building
- Soyuzzoloto House
