= Novosibirsk State University of Economics and Management =

Social and economics higher research institute in Novosibirsk, Russia

- Новосибирский государственный университет экономики и управления
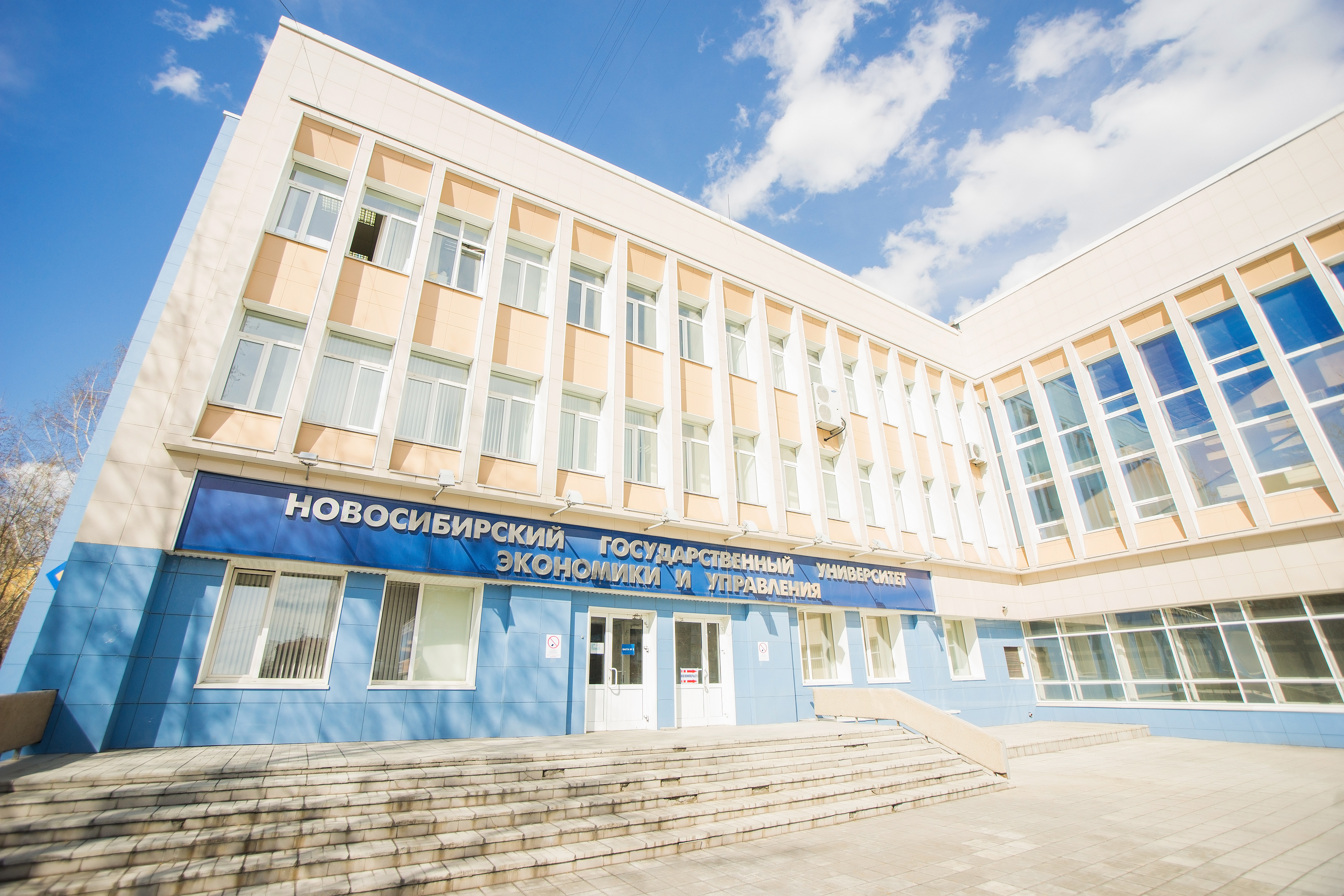
- Type: Public
- Established: 1929
- Location: Novosibirsk, 630099, Russian Federation; 55°02′02″N 82°55′44″E
- Campus: Urban
- Website: nsuem.ru

Novosibirsk State University of Economics and Management, NSUEM (Russian: Федеральное государственное бюджетное образовательное учреждение высшего образования «Новосибирский государственный университет экономики и управления «НИНХ», Federal State-Funded Educational Institution of Higher Education «Novosibirsk State University of Economics and Management») is a social and economic higher education institute in Novosibirsk, Russia.

== History ==
In 1929 Siberian Institute of National Economy was launched in Novosibirsk, and was based in the contemporary building of Novosibirsk State architectural and art Academy. The main aim was to provide the economic managers for the national economics. Teaching staff in 1929 consisted of 10 people and in 1931 it gained up to 57. In the first academic year Institute launched 4 faculties: planned economy, industrial, product exchange and distribution, economic and agricultural management.

In 1967 according to Administrative order by the Minister of high and secondary education ) Novosibirsk Institute of National Economy (NINE) was launched on the basis of All Union correspondence financial-and-economic Institute branch. NINE was launched on the 1 of August 1968.

In 1994 the Institute received the status of the Academy, and in 2004, the status of the University. The University status led NSUEM to a new name: Novosibirsk State University of Economics and Management.

There are:

- Faculty of Law,
- Faculty of Corporate Economics and Entrepreneurship,
- Faculty of Public Sector,
- Faculty of Basic Training
- Language Center: Russian Language Courses,
- International business school, where some international educational programs are realized,
- Center of graduates support, etc.

In 1991 Thesis board was organized. In 1992 Institute has become an experimental place to launch double level education system: Bachelor's Degree and master's degree.

In January, 2001 for the first time issued its magazine “Our Academy”

In 2015 University was reorganized:

- Institutes were formed into faculties;
- New management system was formed (Departments of youth policy, external affairs, informational technologies and scientific policy)

Since 4 February 2021 NSUEM is headed by Pavel Novgorodov.

== NSUEM rectors ==
- Viktor Pervushin (19 May 1967 – 17 May 1974)
- Viktor Schukin (17 May 1974 – 19 July 1983)
- Anatolii Korobkin (14 July 1983 – 15 September 1986)
- Petr Shemetov (27 November 1986 – 16 February 1998)
- Yurii Gusev (28 April 1998 – 29 April 2013)
- Olga Molchanova (29 April 2013 – 22 May 2014)
- Alexandr Novikov (7 July 2014 – 2021)
- Pavel Novgorodov (since 7 February 2021).

== NSUEM today ==
Novosibirsk State University of Economics and Management (NSUEM) is the biggest educational complex in the field of economics in Western Siberia.

Over 13 thousand students study in NSUEM.

NSUEM has tier system of continuous education: undergraduate, graduate, and doctoral programs.

There are 4 faculties at NSUEM:

1. Faculty of Corporate Economics and Entrepreneurship
2. Faculty of Government
3. Faculty of Law
4. Faculty of Basic Education

Another level of NSUEM education system is postgraduate education:

- Additional training and professional education courses;
- Educational centers and schools

NSUEM actively implements educational technologies: professional simulations, workshops, project method, and on-line education. MBA program provides training for the top-managers, APTECH program trains IT-specialists. Also there are retraining programs and advanced training programs. Cooperation with international Universities and organizations is an integral part of NSUEM life, which leads to active student exchange programs.

== University structure ==
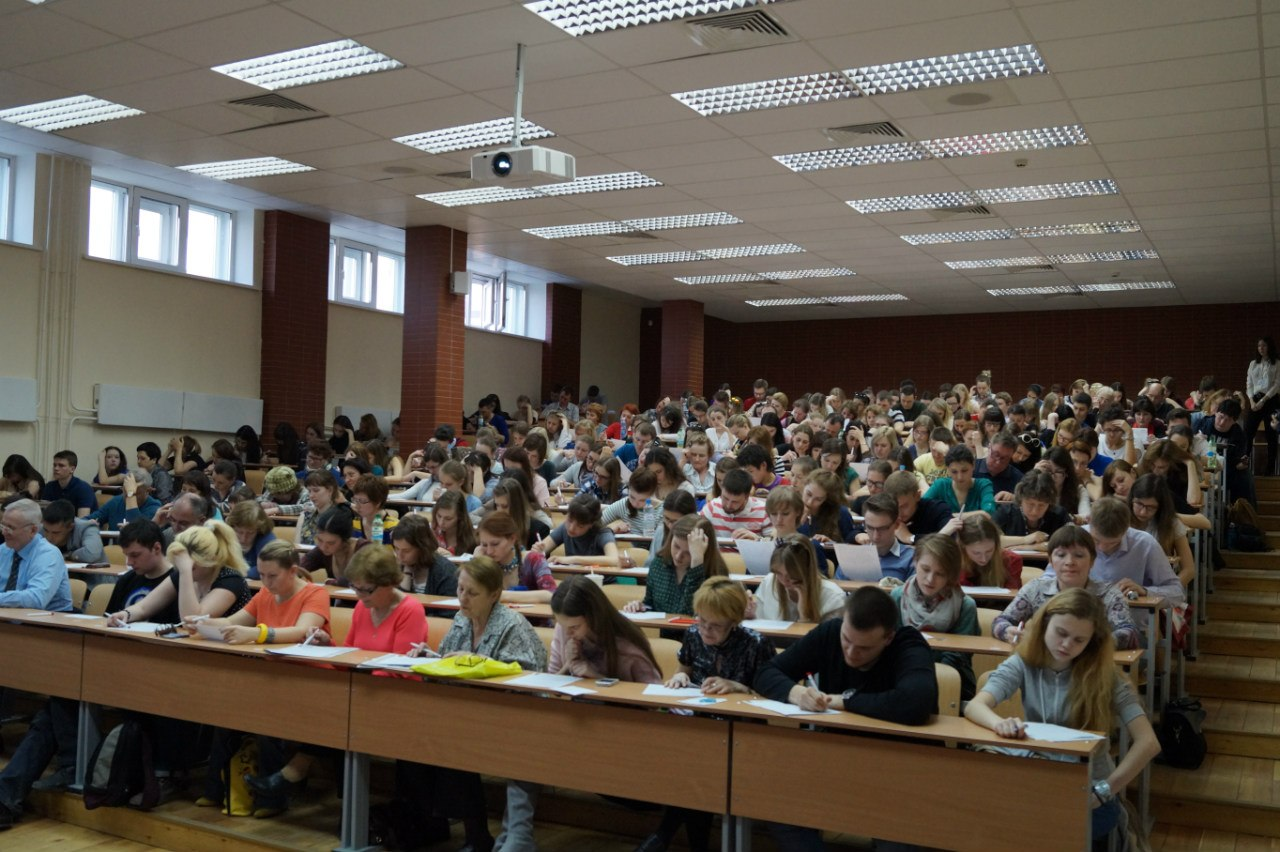
Lectory room

=== Faculty of Corporate Economics and Entrepreneurship ===
Faculty of Corporate Economics and Entrepreneurship is a structural subdivision of NSUEM

In 2015 a new step of development has begun in NSUEM, within the University reconstruction Institutes of Economics and Management were united into Faculty of economics.

At the moment Faculty of Economics is the biggest in NSUEM by the quantity of students.

Acting dean – Vladiimir Kiz, PhD.

1. Department of Service Business
2. Department of information and analytical support and accounting
3. Department of Corporate Governance and Finance
4. Department of Marketing, Advertising and Public Relations
5. Department of Financial Market and Financial Institutions
6. Department of Labor Economics and Human Resources
7. Department of Innovation and Entrepreneurship

=== Faculty of Basic Education ===
Faculty of Basic Education is a structural subdivision of NSUEM.

Acting Dean – Lada Shekhovtsova

1. Department of Foreign Languages
2. Department of Physical Education and Sport
3. Department of Philosophy and Humanities
4. Department of Economic Theory
5. Department of Mathematics and Natural Sciences
6. Center of Secondary Vocational Education

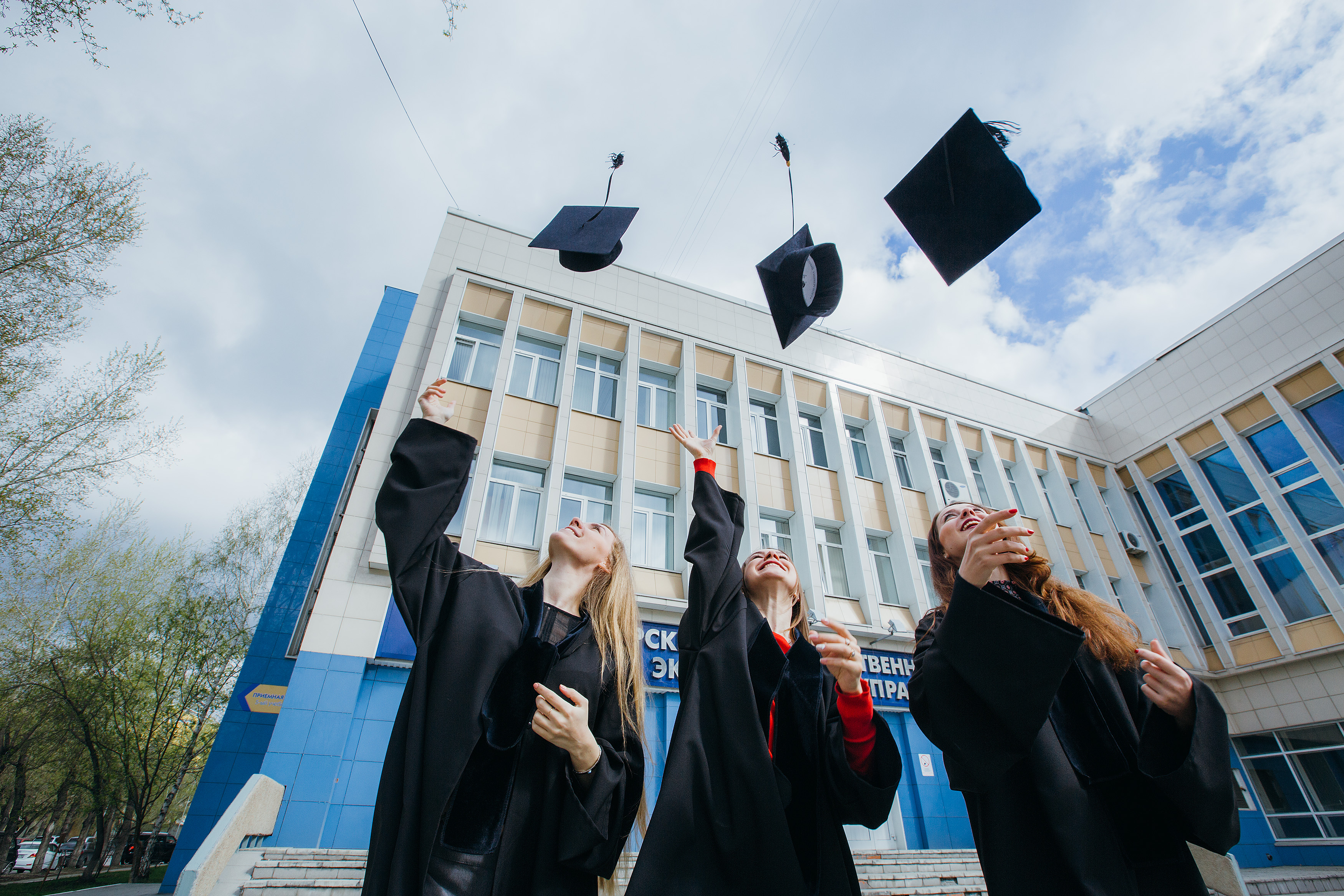
Graduation

=== Faculty of Government ===
Faculty of Government

Acting Dean – Vladimir Romashin, PhD.

1. Department of Statistics
2. Department of Sociology
3. Department of World Economy, International Relations and Law
4. Department of Public Finance
5. Department of Psychology, Pedagogy and Law
6. Department of Regional Economics and Management
7. Department of Environmental Safety and Environmental Management
8. Department of Applied Informatics
9. Department of Information Technology

=== Faculty of Law ===
the demand of the education programs development, NSUEM launches Faculty of Law. “Legal clinic” is a part of the Faculty. Faculty is oriented for lawyers training for organizations of different economy spheres.

Acting Dean – Oleg Sherstoboev, PhD.

1. Department of Administrative, Financial and Corporate Law
2. Department of Civil and Business Law
3. Department of Theory and History of State and Law
4. Department of Criminal Law and National Security.

== Academic activities ==
NSUEM academic day starts at 08.00 a.m and lasts till 20.00. In the group schedule there are 4 classes the most.

== Extra-curricular activities ==
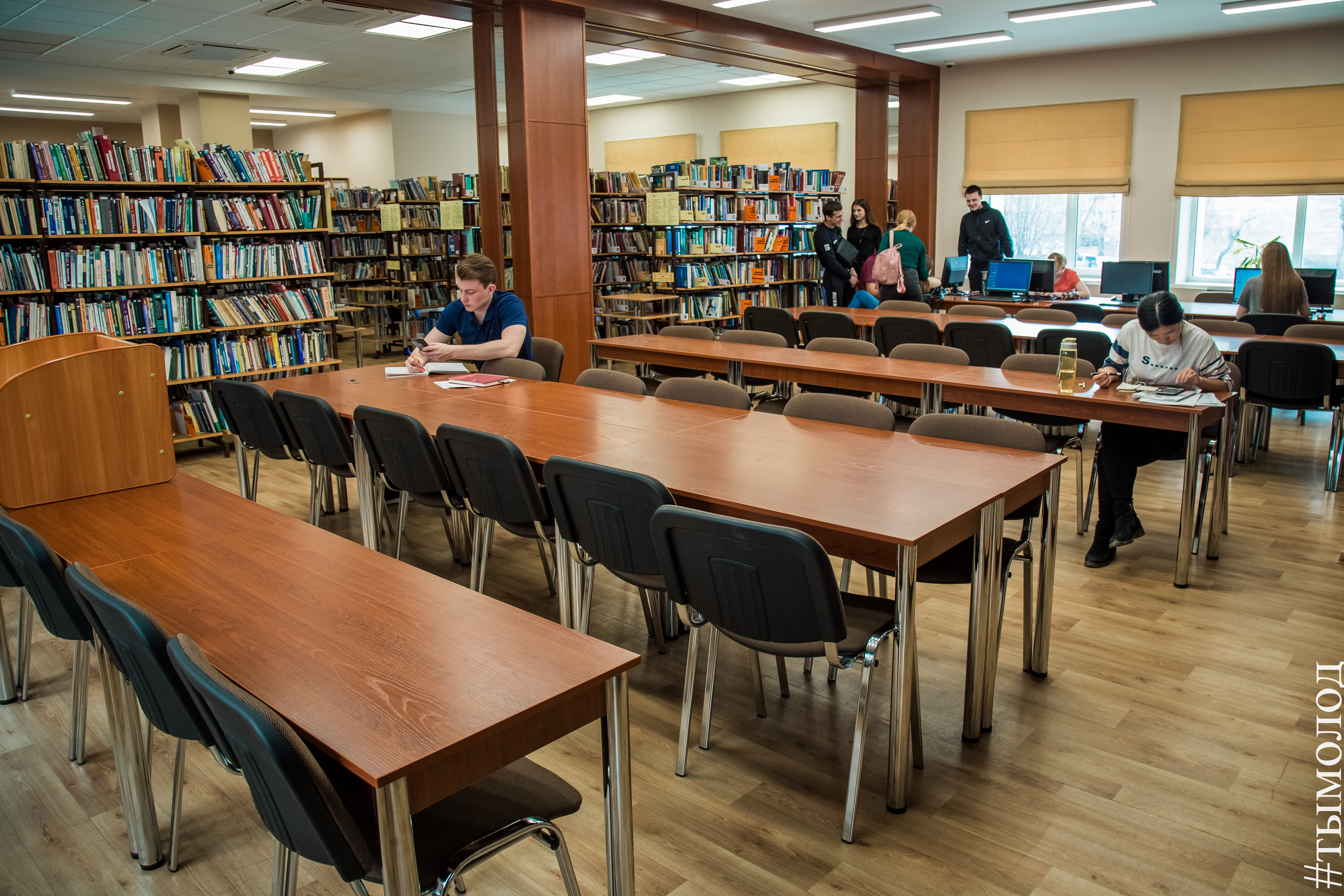
Library

NSUEM offers 7 areas of extra-curricular activities:

1. Leadership and initiatives;
2. International relations;
3. Analytics, science and innovation;
4. Culture and creation work;
5. Healthy lifestyle and safety & security;
6. Business and Entrepreneurship;
7. Politics and governance.

== International relations in NSUEM ==
NSUEM is an active participant of academic and scientific exchange programs. University has over 150 international Agreements. Since 1991 NSUEM works with international organizations and launches international projects. NSUEM cooperates with: CIS countries, Federal Republic of Germany, Republic of China, Mongolia, Republic of Korea, United States, France, Czech Republic, Republic of India, etc.

Main directions of International activities are:

- Students exchange programs;
- Interuniversity cooperation;
- Scientific and research projects

Educational programs in the frames of academic exchange:

- Student's exchange programs;
- Language schools;
- Summer schools;
- Double Degree programs;
- MBA co-programs;
- Teachers exchange programs;
- Scientific and research programs;
- New approaches in teaching technologies.

NSUEM partners:

- Xinjiang University, China
- Dalian University of foreign languages, China
- Mudanjiang Normal University, China
- SolBridge, International Business school
- State University of New York, USA
- Coburg University of Applied Sciences, Germany
- Management College, Mancosa, Republic of South Africa
- Arena Multimedia], Republic of India
- Animation Surat

Over 200 students and teaching staff took part in exchange programs and international events. NSUEM welcomed official delegation of: South Africa, Republic of India, Japan, Federal Republic of Germany, etc.

== NSUEM publications ==
=== “NSUEM reporter”, a scientific magazine ===
NSUEM reporter is issued 4 times a year.

Chief editor – Vladimir Glinskiy, Doctor of economics, professor, Head of Statistic Department, NSUEM

=== Scientific Magazine “Ideas and ideals” ===
Issued once a quarter (in 2 parts)

=== Humanitarian almanac «Human.RU»/ ===
Almanac publishes: modern research results in the spheres of: philosophy, psychology, pedagogic, traditional and modern anthropology practices.

=== Newspaper «Our Academy» ===
It is issued once in 2 weeks, having 16 columns. It covers: University life, interviews, scientific research results, etc. The circulation is 500 distributed in University. “Our Academy” has its e-publication within the official web-site of NSUEM. .

== Entering NSUEM ==
Entering NSUEM for Bachelor's degree is based on the results of Unified State Exam
