= Grigory Zhernovkov =

Russian journalist and lawyer

- Григорий Жерновков
- Born: 8 January 1876; Lebedevka, Tomsk Governorate, Russian Empire
- Died: 1937 (aged 60–61)
- Occupations: journalist, lawyer, politician

Grigory Ivanovich Zhernovkov (Russian: Григорий Иванович Жерновков; 1876–1937) was a Russian journalist, lawyer, Siberian regionalist, public and political figure.

== Biography ==
Grigory Zhernovkov was born on January 8, 1876, in the village of Lebedevka, Tomsk Governorate. His father was a village priest. He studied at the law faculty of Kazan University.

In 1898, Zhernovkov was imprisoned for participating in a student demonstration. In 1902, he was exiled to Simbirsk for chairmanship over a gathering of students and deprived of the right to study at the universities of the Russian Empire.

In September 1902, Zhernovkov moved to Paris, where he studied at the Higher Russian School of Social and Natural Sciences until August 1903, after which he returned to Russia and worked as a legal adviser to the Siberian Railways in Tomsk, but was dismissed in 1905 due to his membership in a strike committee.

In 1906, Zhernovkov graduated from the Tomsk University and in March of the same year he moved to Novonikolayevsk where he was practically immediately searched as a revolutionary figure.

Until March 1907, Zhernovkov worked as a proofreader, and later he worked as a journalist and secretary for the Narodnaya Letopis and Sibirskaya Nov. He also collaborated with publisher Nikolai Litvinov for his publications (Altaiskoye Delo etc.).

In 1910s, he propounded the ideas of regionalism and published in local and other publications, in particular, in the Law and Financial and Industrial Life of Siberia (Tomsk) as well as Sibirskie Zapiski (Krasnoyarsk).

He was an assistant barrister of the Tomsk District Court.

From 1909 to 1914, Zhernovkov was the Vowels of the Novonikolayevsk City Duma.

In 1915, he was one of the organizers of the Novonikolayevsk branch of the Society for the Study of Siberia. In the same year, he became the chairman of the parent committee of the Women's Gymnasium of P. A. Smirnova.

=== Soviet period ===
In Soviet times, Zhernovkov continued to be published in magazines and newspapers and was a member of the literary movement in Novosibirsk.

After the 1917 February Revolution, together with the playwright and journalist I. Y. Abramovich, he created a regionalist party called the Siberian Union of Independent Socialist Federalists. Nikolai Litvinov became the chairman of the Novonikolayevsk Bureau of this party. However, during the elections to the Duma, the Union failed, after which it practically collapsed.

On October 15, 1917, during the 1st Siberian Regional Congress in Tomsk, Zhernovkov was elected to the Siberian Regional Executive Committee.

In 1917–1920, he participated in public life as a liberal regionalist and at the same time practiced as a lawyer.

In 1920–1921, he was chairman of the Museum Council of the local Department of Public Education and, together with V. A. Anzimirov, participated in the creation of the Novonikolayevsk Museum.

In 1922, Zhernovkov worked in Sibrevcom as a consultant-economist, then as secretary of the directorate of Sibgostorg, and also as an economist at a textile trust, an engineer-economist at Sibstroyput and a gardener-instructor at the Michurin stronghold. He was also a member of the Collegium of Defenders of the Novonikolayevsk Governorate.

In 1920s, he was among the ideologists of the Siberian regionalism and argued that the Soviet government, thanks to the creation of autonomy in the form of the Siberian Krai, practically implements the program of the regionalists and solvs the problems of national autonomy and the development of the Siberian peoples.

In 1928, he fell ill and left for treatment and subsequently lived in Moscow.

In 1937, Grigory Zhernovkov was arrested and shot.

== Archive ==
In 1972, part of the regionalist's archive was destroyed during the demolition of his house, which was located in the floodplain of the Kamenka River, other parts of his archive are kept by the State Archive of Novosibirsk Oblast and local historian S. A. Savchenko from Novosibirsk.
