= Women's Gymnasium of P. A. Smirnova =

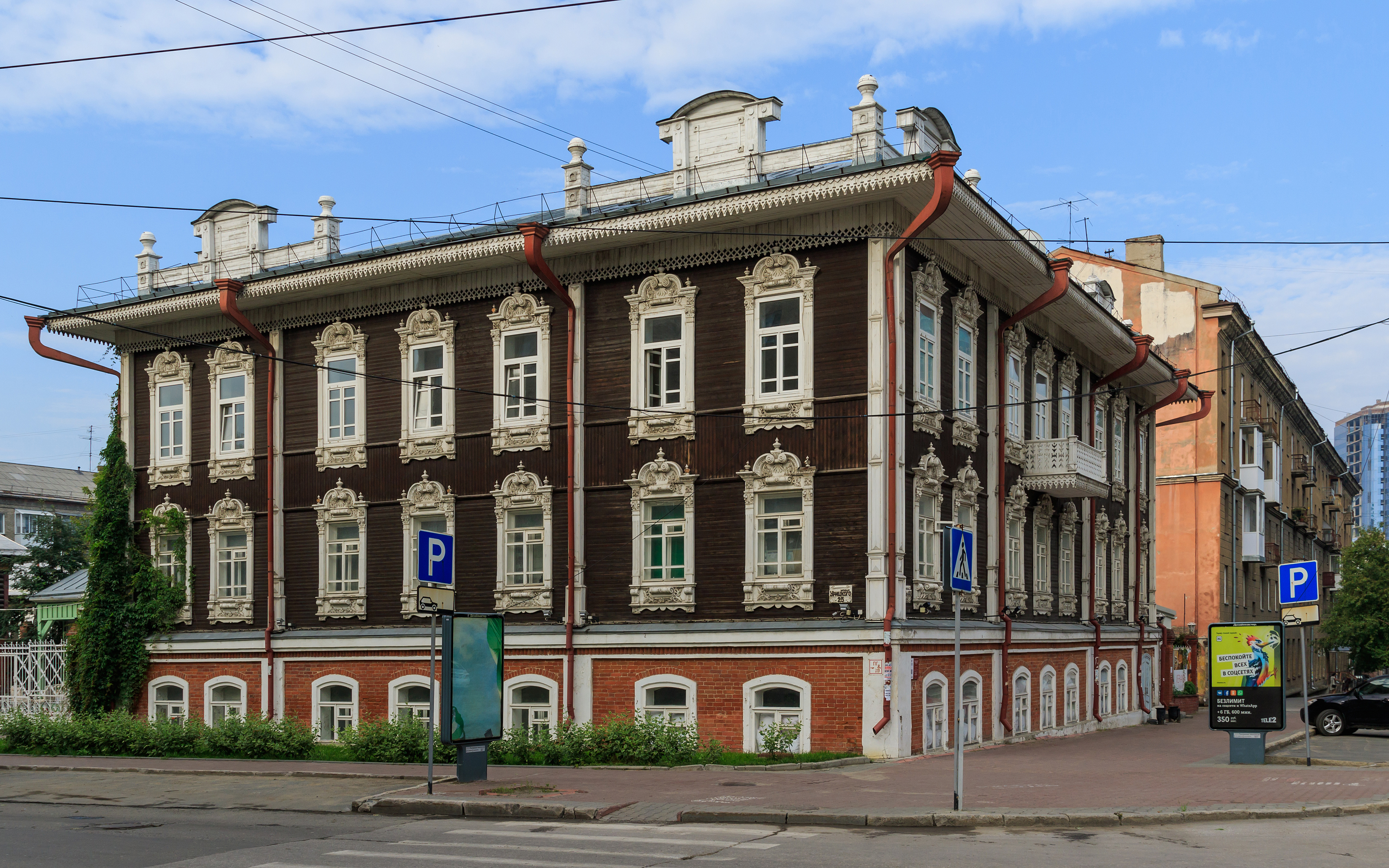
- Novonikolayevsk, Russian Empire

Information
- Founded: 1905; 121 years ago

Women's Gymnasium of P. A. Smirnova was an educational institution founded in Novonikolayevsk in 1905 as a school of the 2nd category. In 1907, the educational institution was reorganized into a women's school of the 1st category, and in 1910 it was transformed into a women's gymnasium. Since 1916, the institution has been officially known as The First Novo-Nikolayevsk Gymnasium of the Ministry of National Education.

== History ==
On May 7, 1905, Samara native Pavla Alexeevna Smirnova opened a school of the 2nd category with four classes in the central part of Novonikolayevsk. For some time, the educational institution occupied a two-story house on Asinkritovskaya Street. This building belonged to the merchant Fyodor Danilovich Mashtakov, and the City Public Administration rented it specifically for the school.

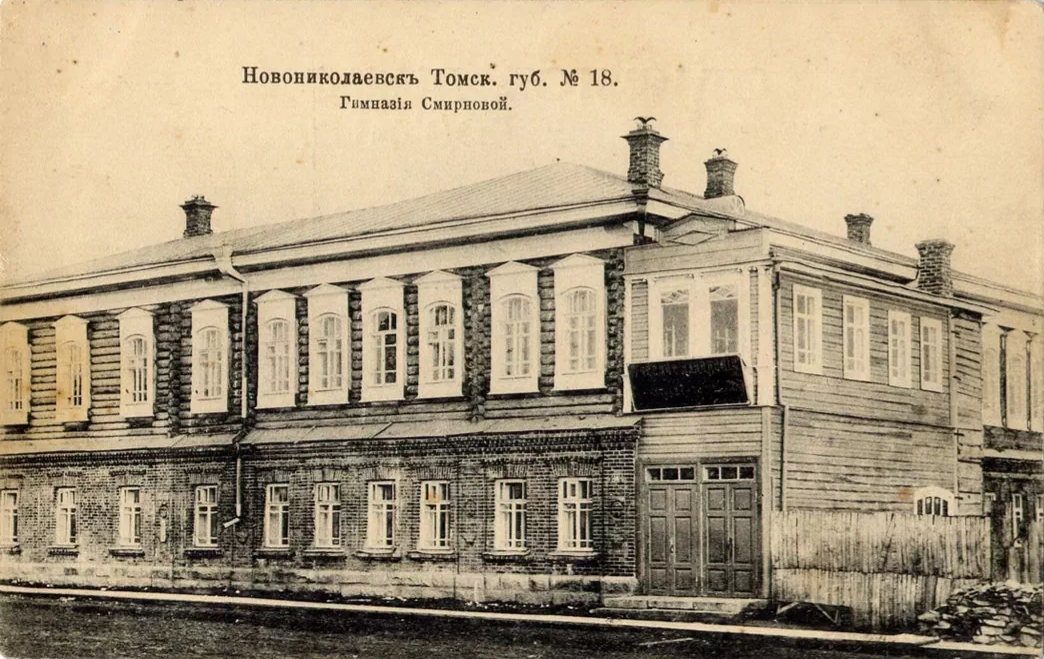
The Gymnasium building on Asinkritovskaya Street.

In 1907, the fifth grade was created at the school. In the same year, the school became a women's school of the 1st category. In 1908, it became a sixth-grade school, in 1909, the seventh grade was organized at the institution, after which Smirnova began planning the opening of the eighth pedagogical class.

The school needed financial assistance, as a result, Pavla Smirnova decided to transfer it to the city. On August 2, 1910, the trustee of the West Siberian Educational District decided to reorganize the institution into the Gymnasium of the Ministry of National Education, after which the financial and economic affairs of the school were decided by the Board of Trustees which at different times included Kalisfenia Platonovna Lapshina, Ekaterina Nikolayevna Vstavskaya, Elena Iosifovna Piton, Mikhail Pavlovich Vostokov, Alexei Grigorievich Besedin, Sergei Vladimirovich Gorokhov, Mitrofan Alexeevich Runin, Alexander Michailovich Lukanin, Nikolai Michailovich Tikhomirov, Andrei Dmitrievich Kryachkov.

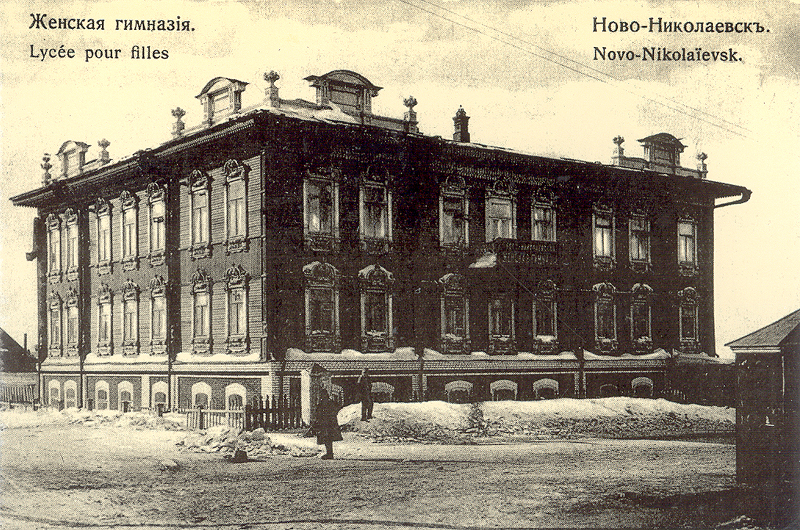
The Gymnasium building on the corner of Gondatti and Kuznetskaya streets.

In 1913, the gymnasium moved from the Mashtakov's House due to its unsatisfactory technical condition. The institution rented two buildings, which belonged to the Barnaul merchant Ivan Surikov. One of these buildings was built on the corner of Gondatti and Kuznetskaya streets at the beginning of the 20th century.

In 1916, a request was sent to the Trustee of the West Siberian Educational District to rename the educational institution into the First Novo-Nikolayevsk Women's Gymnasium of the Ministry of National Education. A new name was needed because another women's gymnasium had already appeared in the city. This request was granted.

On July 1, 1918, Sofiya Tyzhnova was appointed to the post of head of the gymnasium. The reasons for Smirnova's departure from the position of the head are unknown.

In 1919, despite the Civil War, the gymnasium continued to operate, as evidenced by various documents from that period. One of the last known applications for admission to the institution was written on October 13, 1919. It was written by a peasant woman from the village of Verkh-Irmenskoye, Novonikolayevsky Uyezd who asked to accept her daughter for a knowledge test for admission to the first grade. Also in the application it was said that she could not come at the right time "due to the Bolshevik uprising in the village". The next day, this request received a positive response.

== Gymnasium buildings and location of premises ==
According to school student Zinaida Matveevna Siryachenko, who left the most detailed memories of the school, preparatory classes were located in a two-story building on Gondatti Street, its second floor was occupied by the living rooms of Pavla Smirnova. Grades 1–7 were in a three-story building on Kuznetskaya Street. The hall was located on the third floor, the library was on the second floor. The first floor was occupied by the chief and doctor's offices, a dressing room, a dining room and a needlework room, in which sewing machines were installed.

Next to the main building there was another house in which students from two parallel classes studied. These classes were organized due to the increase in the number of students.

== Rules ==
According to the recollections of the daughter of one of the pupils of the gymnasium, the rules of the educational institution were very strict: the wearing of jewelry was prohibited, the distinction between the rich, the middle class and the poor was forbidden, senior 7th grade students had the right to get married, and they could wear the only piece of jewelry, namely a wedding ring.

Visits to summer gardens, masquerades, circus events and other entertainment venues were also banned. Any gymnasium student could be expelled for visiting such places without permission. For example, Sofiya Mashtakova, the daughter of the merchant Ivan Danilovich Mashtakov, could be expelled from the gymnasium for attending a masquerade organized at the Officers' Assembly. The young woman continued her studies thanks to her remorse and the absence of violations in the past. The Pedagogical Council also decided to express deep regret to her parents.

Permission to visit entertainment places could only be issued by the class matron. The Journal of Accounting for Information of 7th Grade Students 1912–1913, for example, documented individual permissions to attend Karinskaya's concert and such operas as The Queen of Spades, and The Demon.

The students also visited the cinema, as evidenced by the letter of thanks from Pavla Smirnova to Fedot Makhotin, the owner of the cinema.

School matrons were obliged to supervise the life of their pupils also outside the gymnasium. This applied to students who lived without parents. The matrons were supposed to visit the apartments of these young women, and then report any extraordinary cases to the Head, who passed the information to the Pedagogical Council through the Chairman of the Pedagogical Council.

=== School day ===
Before the start of the lessons, the students and teachers went up to the third floor to pray, after which they dispersed to the classrooms. Schoolgirls greeted teachers by standing up. The lessons lasted 45 minutes. The breaks between classes were 10 minutes. There was also a big break (20 minutes).

== Educational programm ==
Pupils began to learn a foreign language from the first grade. There were also needlework lessons in the gymnasium.

== Holidays and suspension of classes during extreme weather ==
Nonresident students could go on vacation after issuing a special ticket signed by the headmistress. In December 1912, such a document was received, for example, by Alexandra Dobrokhotova who was allowed to go to the village of Verkh-Irmen, Barnaul Uyezd, Tomsk Governorste, to visit her parents. The vacation lasted from December 13, 1912 to January 7, 1913. Similar tickets were received in 1912–1913 by Evlampiya Ryazantseva (to Bolotnoye), Nina Sizikova (to Barlak), Bronislava Karvatskaya (to Kainsk Station), Elizaveta Lunts (to Kochenyovo), Kobyakova Lyudmila (to Spirino).

According to the order, which was received by all educational institutions of Novonikolayevsk in December 1915, studies were canceled during strong winds and frosts. Green flags on fire and bell towers were supposed to signal the day of stopping studies.

== Paid and free education ==
The annual tuition fee at the gymnasium was: preparatory classes – 50 rubles; main classes – 100 rubles; additional eight (pedagogical) class – 150 rubles.

During the Civil War, a letter from the Board of Trustees to the City Duma reports that the board was forced to increase the fee for all classes to 140 rubles due to the increasing cost of living. It also mentioned that payment for all classes was 60 rubles before the war, except for the 8th class (160 rubles).

Some students were exempted from tuition fees. Applications for exemption from the fee were considered in the City Duma. For example, student Anna, daughter of the deceased tradesman Timofei Andreev Sukovatov, continued to study for free. Pavla Smirnova, in her petition to the Board of Trustees, indicated that Anna's guardian, Ekaterina Gavrilova Sukovatova, is an elderly woman who suffers from rheumatism and earns money by washing clothes.

Funds for tuition fees for students could come from charity evenings, which were often organized jointly with students of the men's gymnasium. These events took place in the City Trade House, the men's gymnasium or Officers' Assembly.

== Financial expenses ==
The gymnasium was constantly experiencing financial difficulties, as evidenced by correspondence with various institutions, merchants, suppliers, owners of premises, etc. For example, the water carrier Mikhail Pavlov Gutovskikh presented an invoice to the gymnasium for November 1908, in which the following prices were indicated: 324 rubles for the delivery of 54 barrels of water (one barrel cost 6 rubles) to the first building; 208 rubles for the delivery of 26 barrels (one barrel cost 8 rubles) to the second building. The total amount was 532 rubles.

The Siberian Commercial and Industrial Partnership 129 rubles 7 copecks for needles, muslin, paper, coarse calico, etc.

== Crowdfunding ==
Money for the needs of the educational institution could be raised through crowdfunding. So, the City chronicle section of the Narodnaya Letopis indicated the names of people who donated money to install a telephone in the gymnasium: N. A. Ippolitov – 1,50 rubles, K. N. Lapina – 1,60, M. P. Vostokov – 1, D. L. Nakhimson – 1, A. M. Lukanin – 3, N. P. Litvinov – 3. As a result, the phone was installed.

== Uniform ==
The uniform consisted of a dark green dress, an apron, brown or (more often) black linen stockings and boots. Schoolgirls also wore a white dress apron to attend symphony orchestras or charity evenings. They usually wore dark bows, while white bows were worn during the holidays. In the warm season, schoolgirls wore white stockings and shoes. Since the fifth grade, girls could wear shoes with a heel. Students brought own shoes and changed shoes in the gymnasium wardrobe, which was locked by a doorman during the lessons.

Yellow oval badges with the name of the institution (The First Novo-Nikolayevsk Gymnasium) were attached to the cap or to the left side of the dress.

The teachers wore a blue dress.

== Gymnasium meal ==
Women from the charitable society prepared sandwiches for schoolgirls in the dining room of the gymnasium. Sandwiches consisted of a quarter of a French roll with butter, caviar, sausage, cheese or ham. Drinks included tea, coffee and cocoa. A sandwich cost five kopecks, while tea could be taken for free.

== Teachers and students ==
Zinaida Siryachenko recalled that Klavdiya Sergeevna Polyanskaya taught literature and history. She was leftist and was very attached to the students. The girls came to her house and read there Chekhov, Kuprin, Gorky and Veresaev, the teacher's favorite writers. She lived a very long time and died in the 1990s. Russian language was taught by Avgusta Ivanovna Nikolskaya, and Maria Fyodorovna Ramman taught German, the singing teacher was Zavadovsky, "a young, handsome, svelte man".

Both peasant girls from Kochenyovo, Kainsk, Ordynskoye, Bolotnoye etc., and the daughters of the richest people in Novonikolayevsk (Lukanin, Kogan, Mashtakov and others) studied at the gymnasium.

The institution was graduated by two well-known physicians in the city: neuropathologist Esfir Shamovskaya and Honored Doctor of the RSFSR Anna Benevolenskaya.
