= Novosibirsk State Art Museum =

Museum in Novosibirsk, Russia

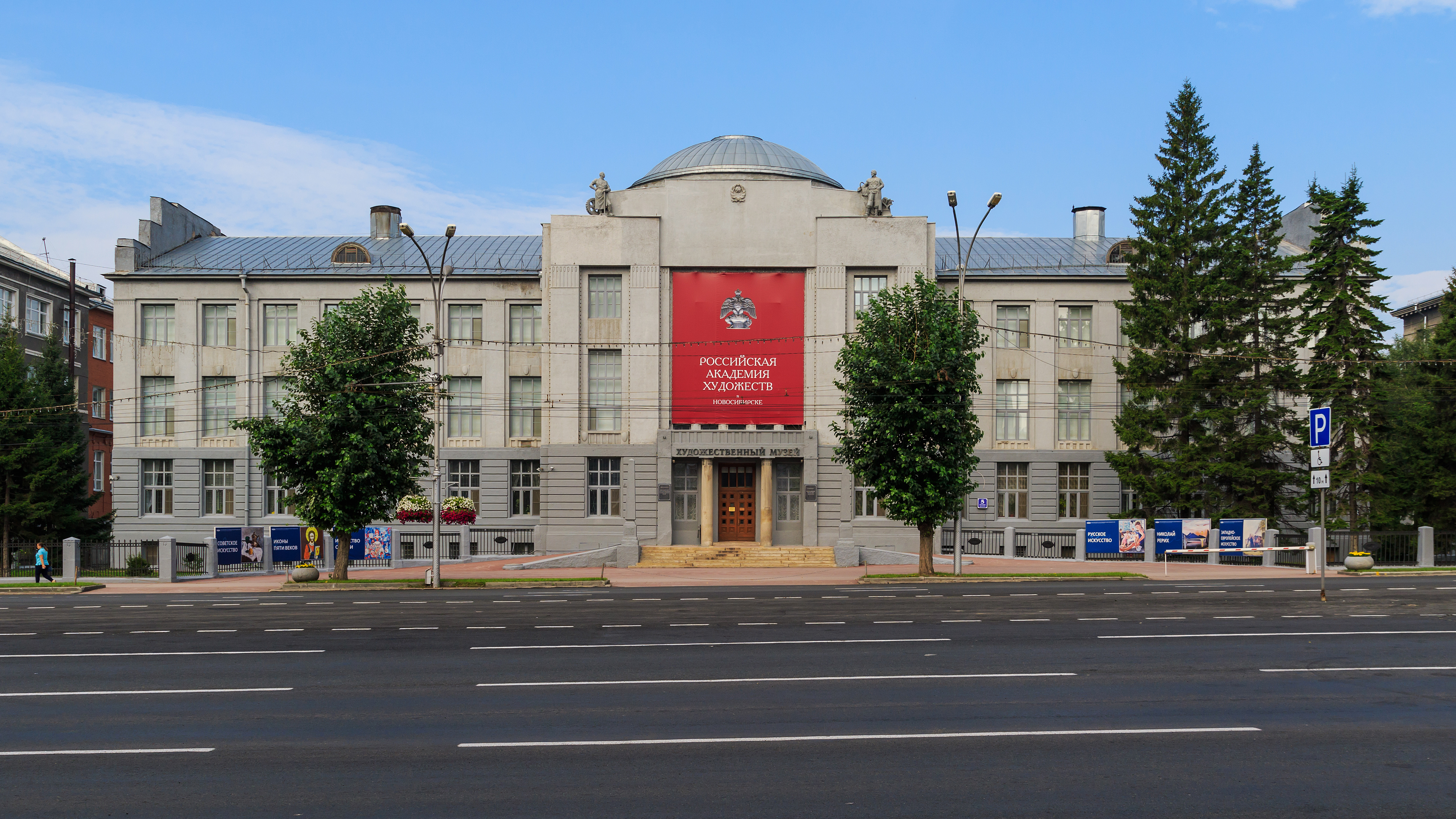
- Interactive map of the Novosibirsk State Art Museum area

General information
- Location: Krasny Avenue 5, Novosibirsk, Russia
- Coordinates: 55.0218°N 82.9215°E
- Construction started: 1925
- Completed: 1926

Design and construction
- Architect: Andrey Kryachkov

The Novosibirsk State Art Museum is a museum in Tsentralny City District of Novosibirsk, Russia. The building was designed by architect Andrey Kryachkov.

== History ==
The museum was founded in 1958 as the Novosibirsk Regional Art Gallery. Initially, it was located on the first floor of one of the 5-story apartment building along the Sverdlov Street.

In 1982, the Gallery moved into the Sibrevcom Building (Krasny Avenue 5) which was built in 1926. The building was designed by architect Andrey Kryachkov. The Sibrevcom Building is a local landmark — the monument of the cultural heritage.

In 2004, the Novosibirsk Regional Art Gallery was renamed the Novosibirsk State Art Museum.

== Contents of exhibition ==
The Novosibirsk State Art Museum exhibits 70 classical and modern artwork annually with average or 150 thousand visitors.

== Gallery ==
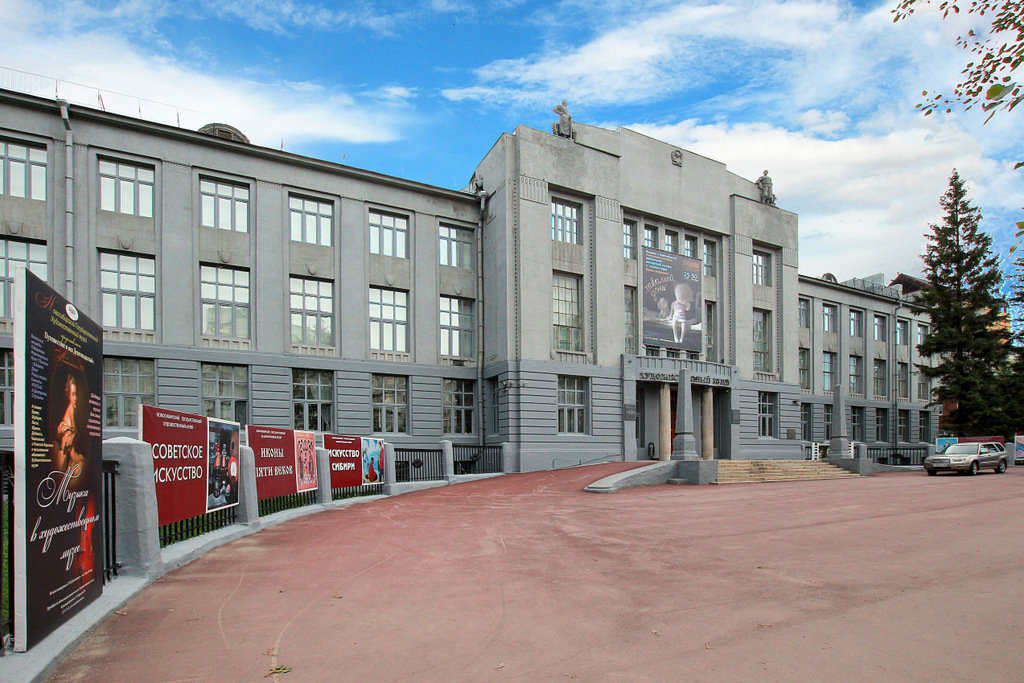

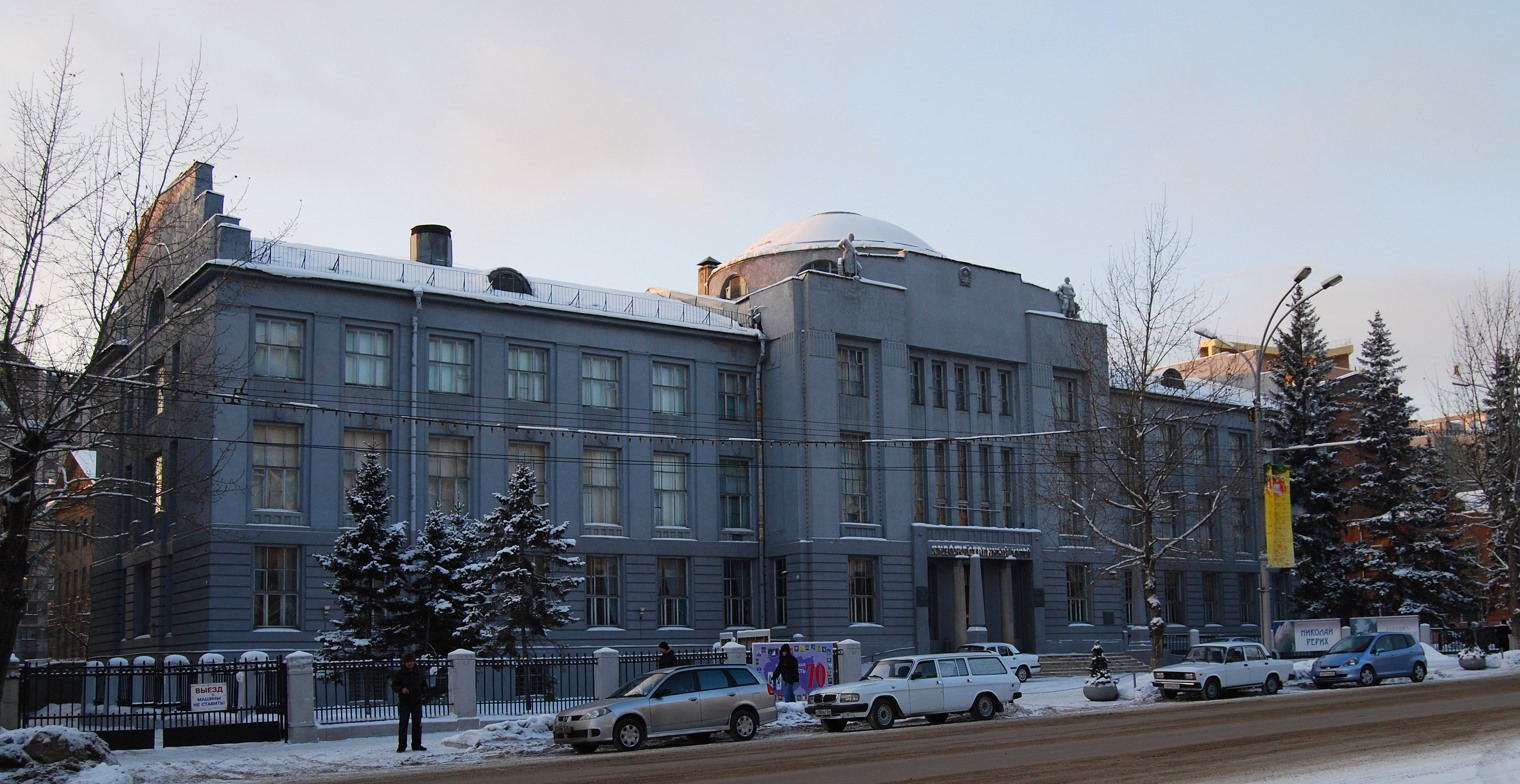

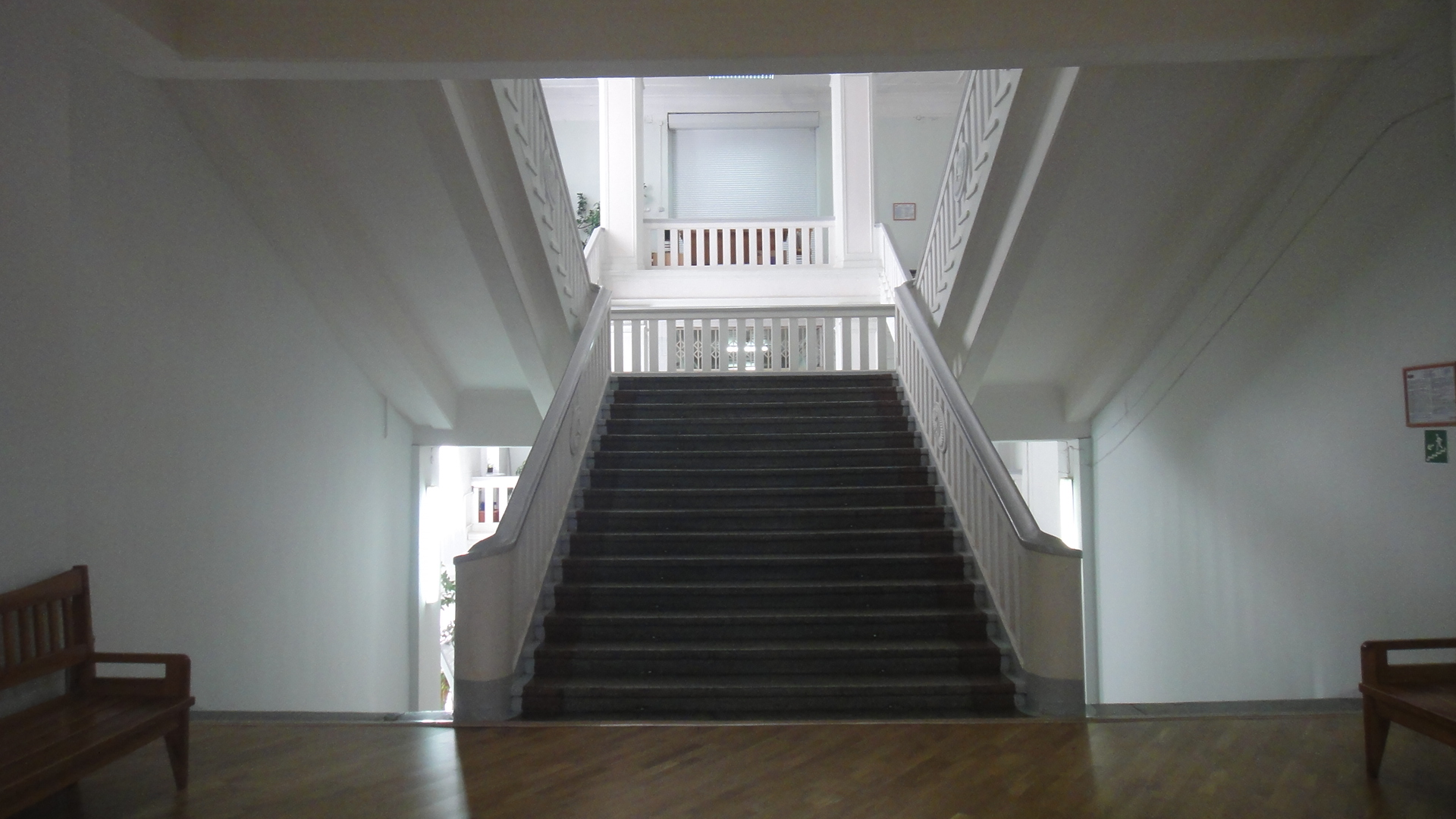

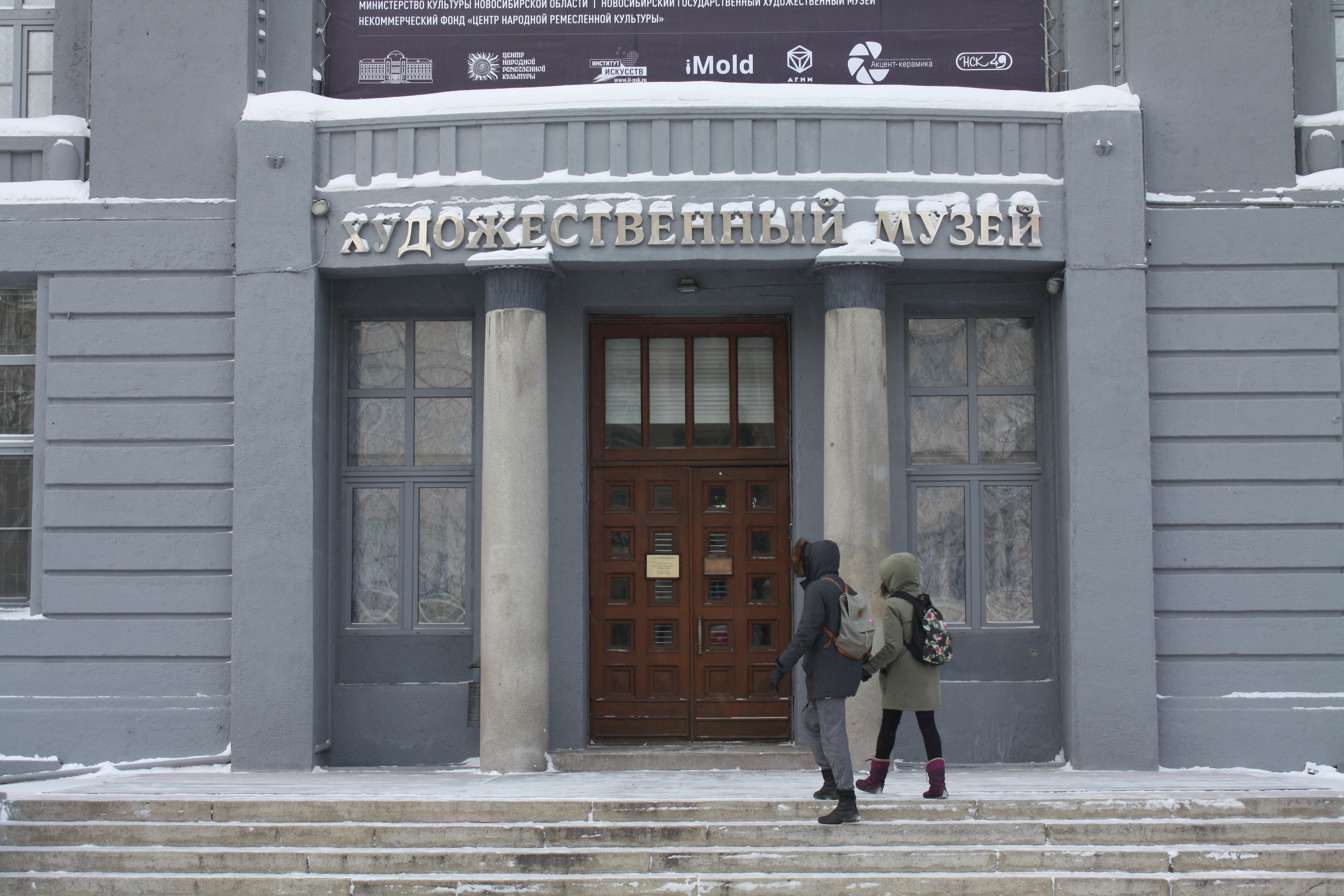

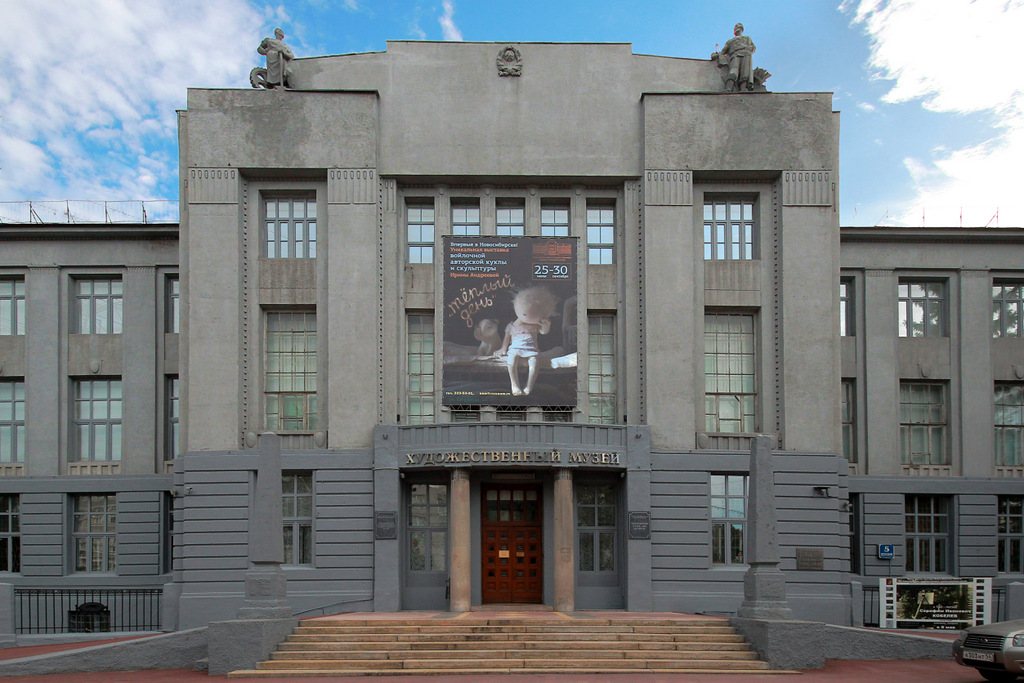

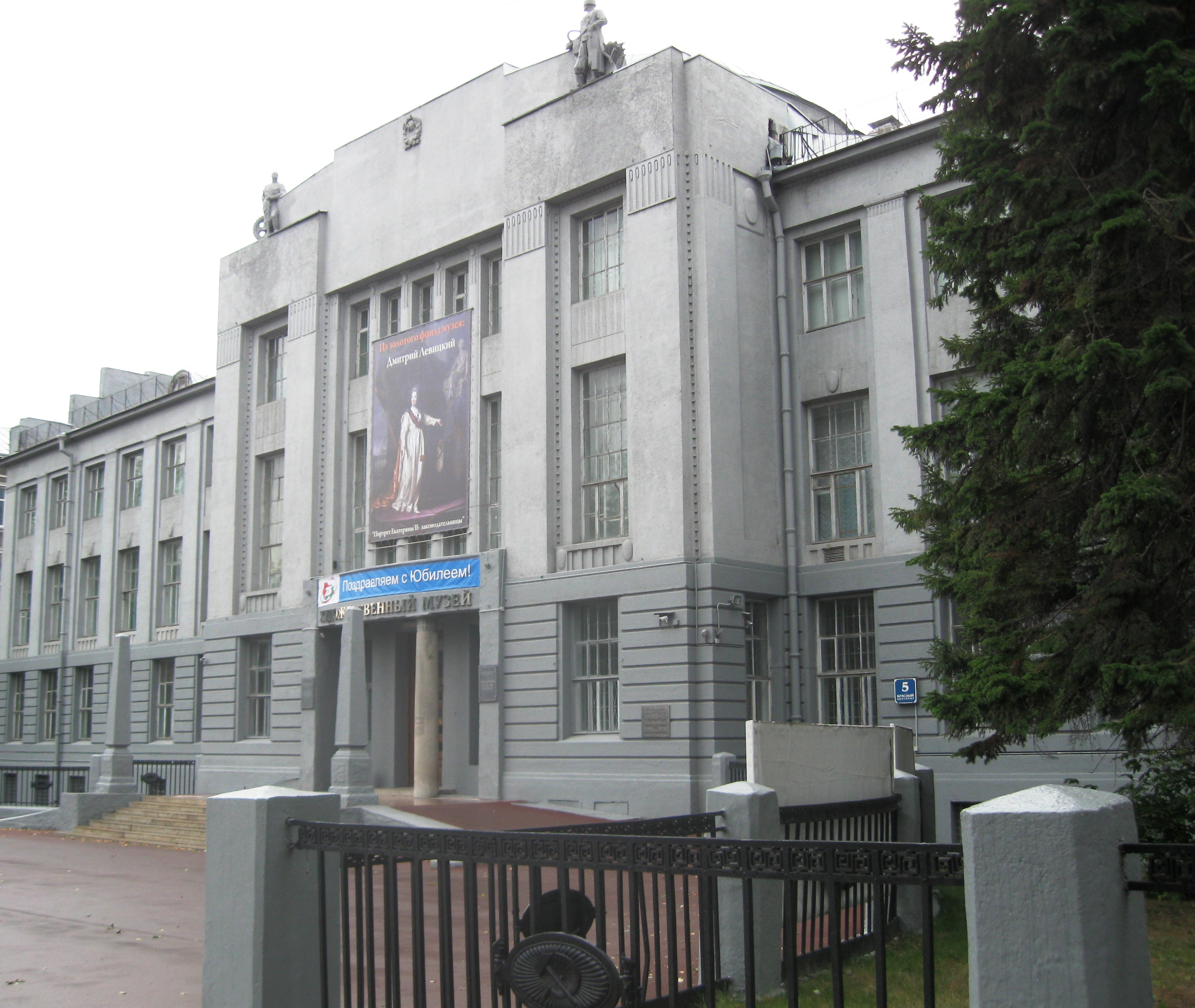

== See also ==
- Russian Museum
- The Museum of Russian Art
