= Novonikolayevsk Fire (1909) =

1909 fire in Russia

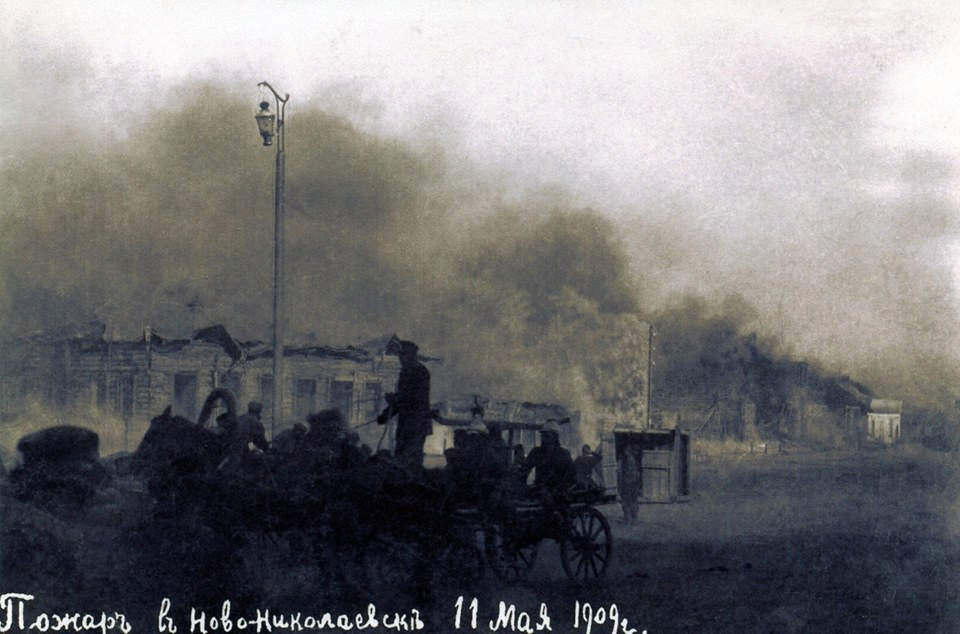
- Date: May 11, 1909
- Location: Novonikolayevsk, Russian Empire

Impacts
- Structures lost: 794 buildings

The Fire of Novonikolayevsk was a conflagration that swept through the central part of the city of Novonikolayevsk (current Novosibirsk) on May 11, 1909.

== Description ==
The fire began in the central part of Novonikolayevsk on Kainskaya Street. Gnusin, a resident of the house on the street, burned resin for his own purposes near his dwelling. Sparks hit one of the buildings, which caught fire. A few minutes later, the hayloft and the warehouse of agricultural tools were ignited. The fire then swept through the Alexandrovskaya, Mostovaya and Spasskaya streets. An hour later, Vorontsovskaya, Krivoshchyokovskaya and Logovskaya streets were on fire.

The Team of Voluntary Firefighting Society could not stop the fire. The City and Zakamenskaya fire brigades also arrived to extinguish the fire, but they also failed.

The fire covered a huge part of the city, from the place of the modern Avtovokzal (Krasny Prospekt 4) to the territory where Central Park is now located, from Nikolayevsky Prospekt to the Kamenka River.

== Damage ==
Damage amounted to more than 5 million golden rubles. The fire destroyed 22 city blocks, with 794 houses burning down. This left around eight thousand people homeless. A few days after the fire, the typhus epidemic hit the city.

== Help ==
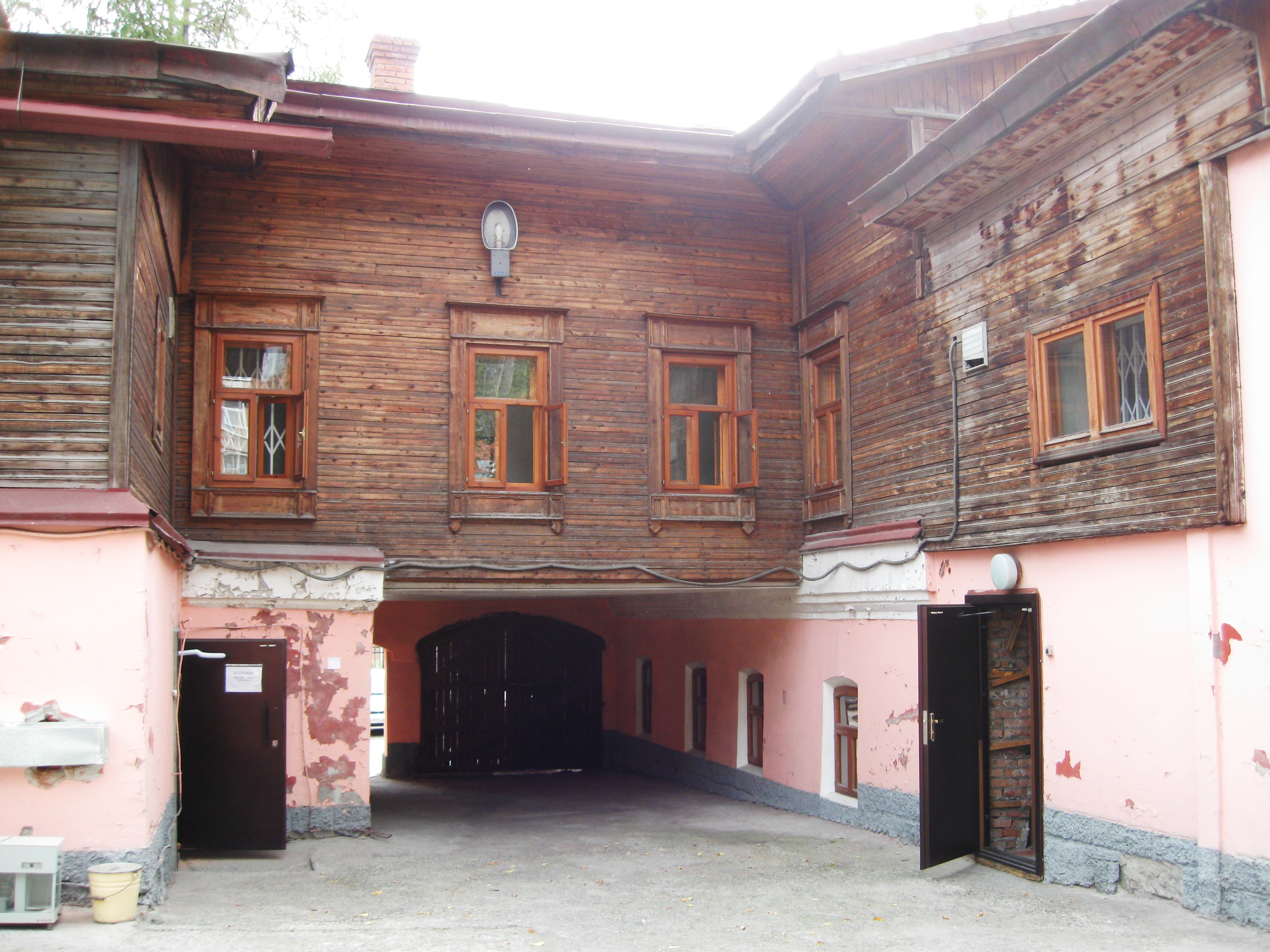
The house, built after the fire at its place of origin.

=== Charitable help ===
Newspaper editoring of the "Narodnaya Letopis" organized a collection of donations for victims of the fire. Members of the Administration (Uprava) Zakharov and Kuznetsov provided a place for the fire brigade and telephone station for free. The owner of the burnt "Lebel Laundry" Miroshnikov proposed to take the linen that had survived the fire in the House of Frolov, located on Obskaya Street. Tomsk Governor N. L. Gondatti arrived in Novonikolayevsk to assist. The Novonikolayevsk Theater of B. D. Chindorin played three performances, the money from these performances was given in favor of the fire victims. The city was visited by the famous actress Vera Komissarzhevskaya, she transferred all the money received from the performance "in favor of the long-suffering city of Novonikolayevsk ..."

=== State aid and insurance payments ===
The state provided lumber for 100 thousand rubles for fire victims and a loan of 150 thousand rubles for the restoration of the city.
