= Tomsk Railway Residential Building =

- Жилой дом Томской железной дороги
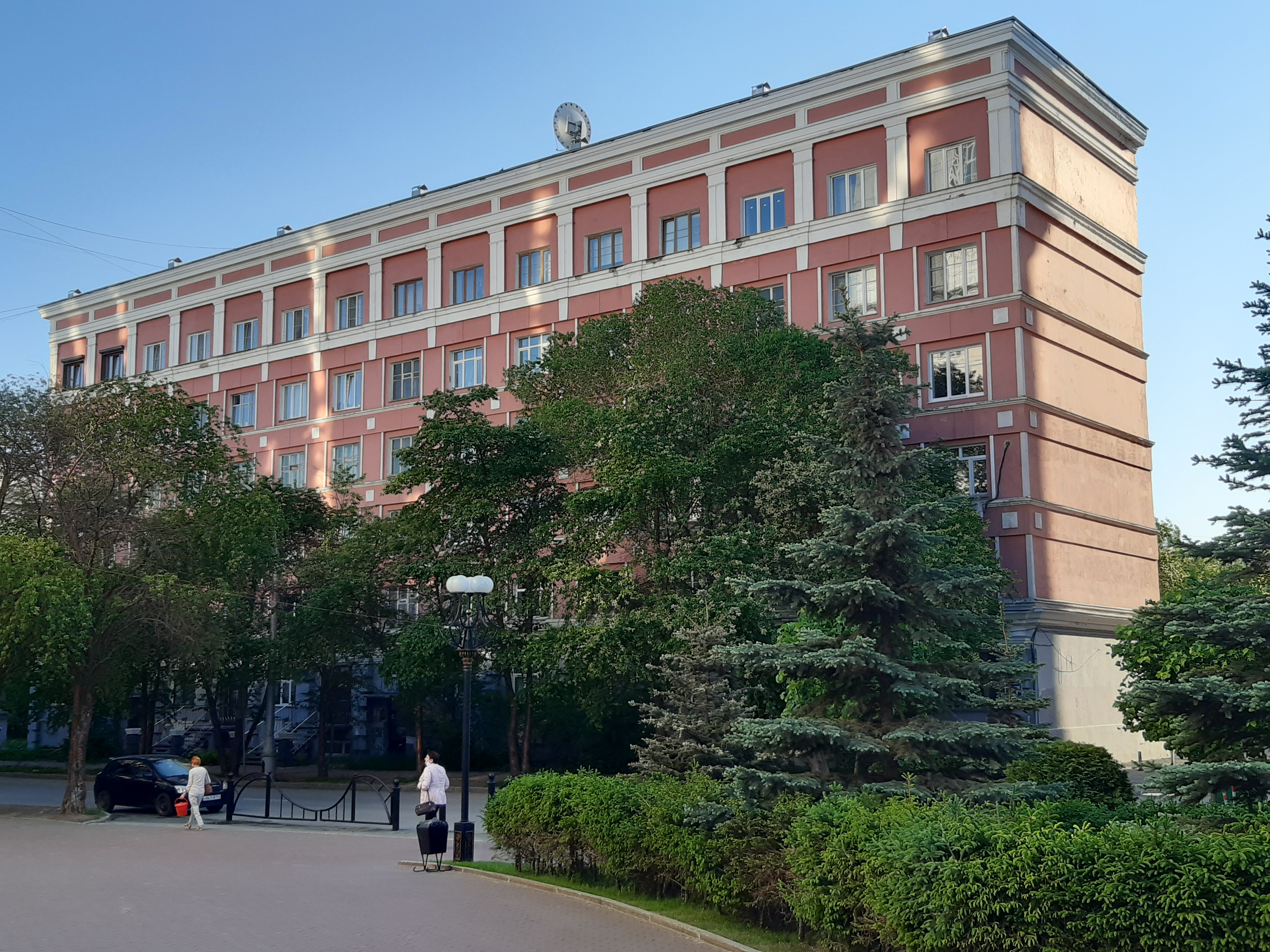
- Interactive map of the Tomsk Railway Residential Building area

General information
- Location: Novosibirsk, Russia
- Coordinates: 55.031°N 82.911°E
- Completed: 1935

Design and construction
- Architect: Arkady Shiryayev

Tomsk Railway Residential Building (Russian: Жилой дом Томской железной дороги) is a building in Zheleznodorozhny District of Novosibirsk, Russia. It is located along Uritsky Street. The building was built in 1935. Architect: Arkady Shiryayev.

== Description ==
The building is located within the historical district of the 1930s.

== Gallery ==
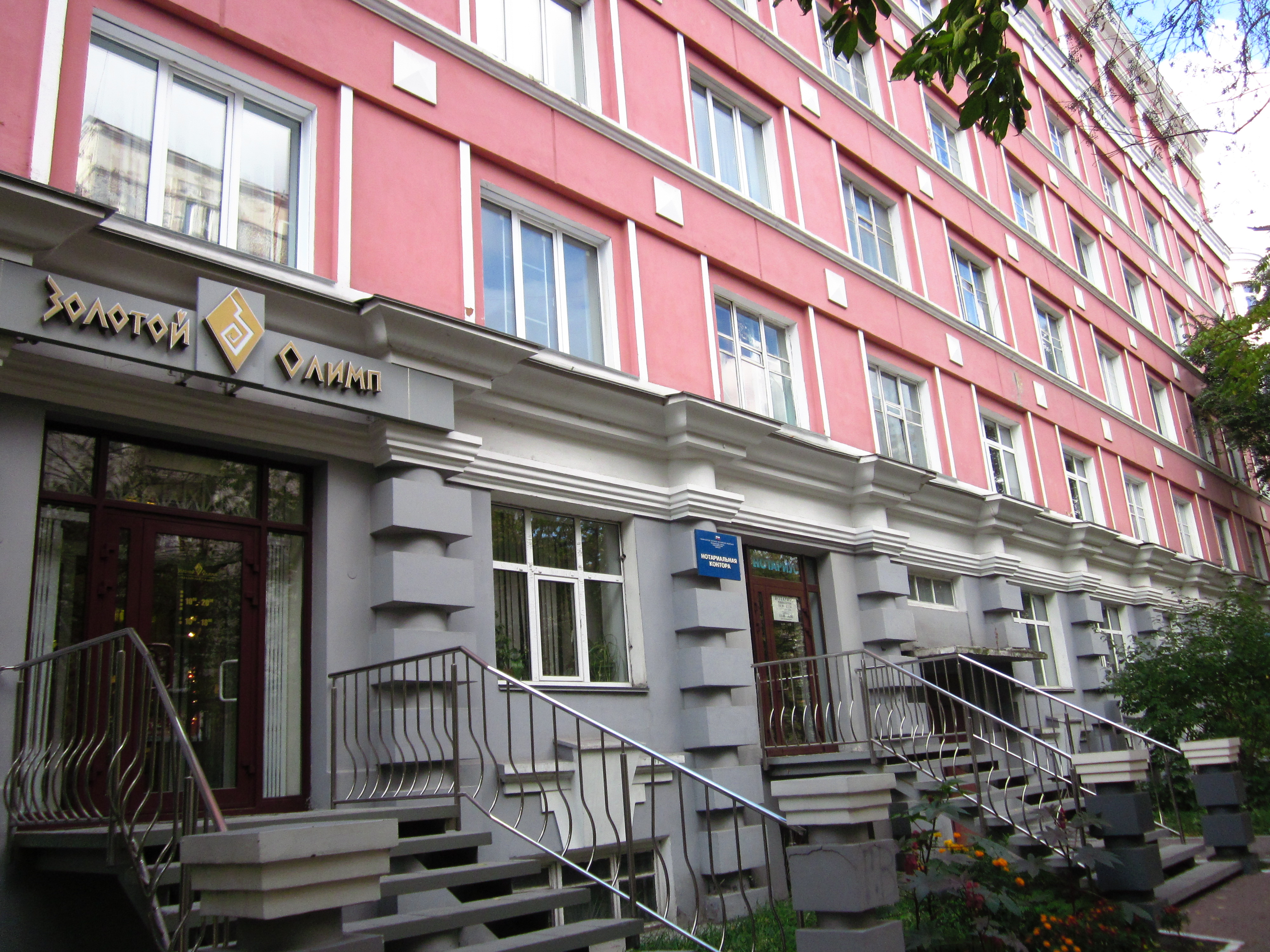

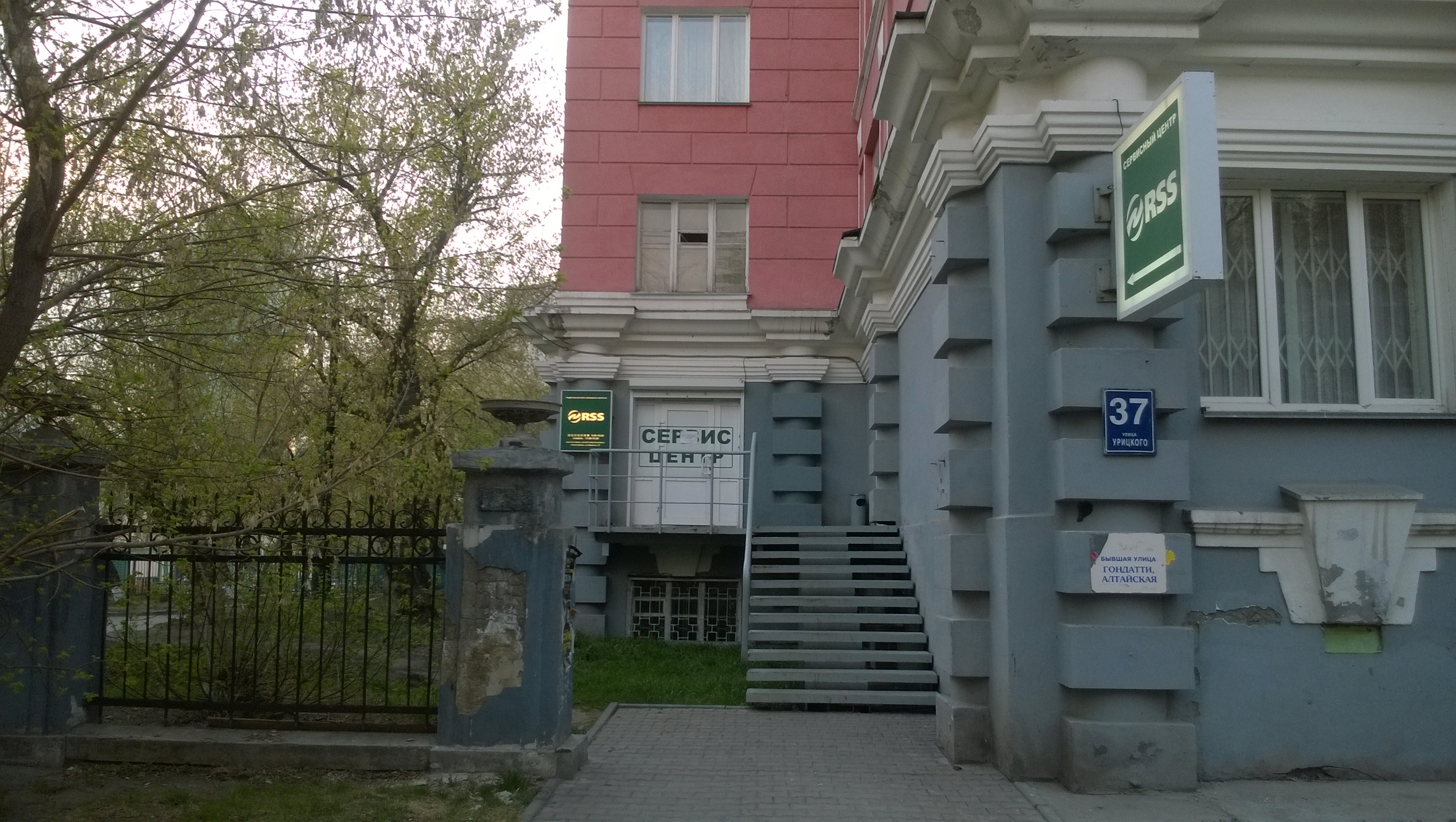

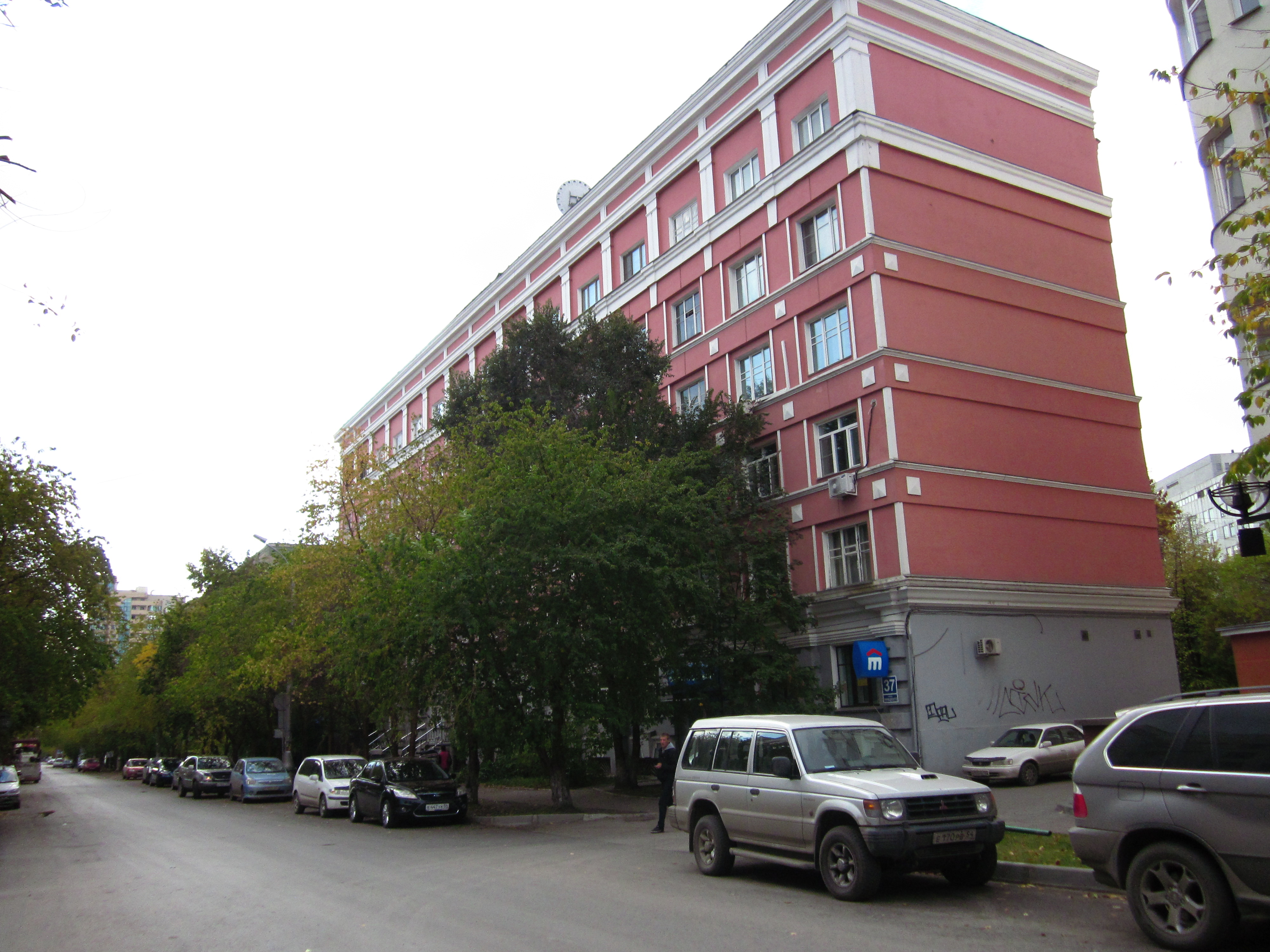

== Bibliography ==
- Воеводина Т.В., Грес М. В., Минов И. Г. etc. (2011). Памятники истории, архитектуры и монументального искусства Новосибирской области (PDF). Новосибирск: ПК «ДЕАЛ». p. 226. ISBN 5-8402-0368-8.
