= Sverdlov Street, Novosibirsk =

Street in Novosibirsk, Russia

Sverdlov Street
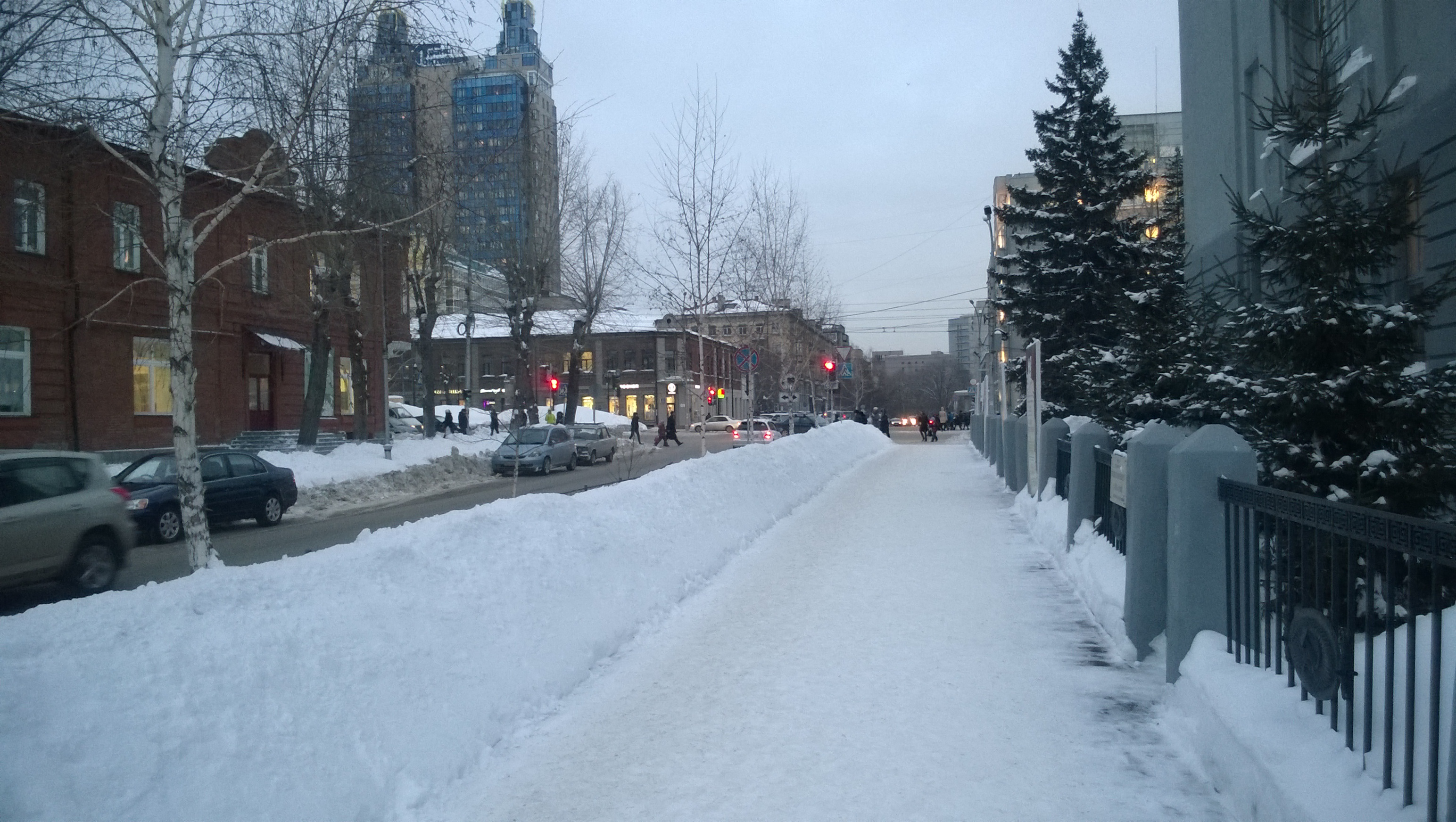
- Interactive map of Sverdlov Street
- Native name: Улица Свердлова (Russian)
- Location: Novosibirsk; Russia
- Coordinates: 55.0221°N 82.9205°E

Sverdlov Street (Russian: Улица Свердлова) is an east–west street between Viktor Vashchuk Proyezd and Serebrennikovskaya Street in Zheleznodorozhny and Tsentralny districts of Novosibirsk, Russia. The street crosses Sovetskaya Street and Krasny Avenue.

== History ==
The street was previously called the Vorontsovskaya Street, but was renamed in 1920.

== Architecture ==
- Mashtakov House is a house built in 1903. Baron Ungern may have been executed in this building.
- Sibrevcom Building is a building designed by Andrey Kryachkov. It was built in 1926.
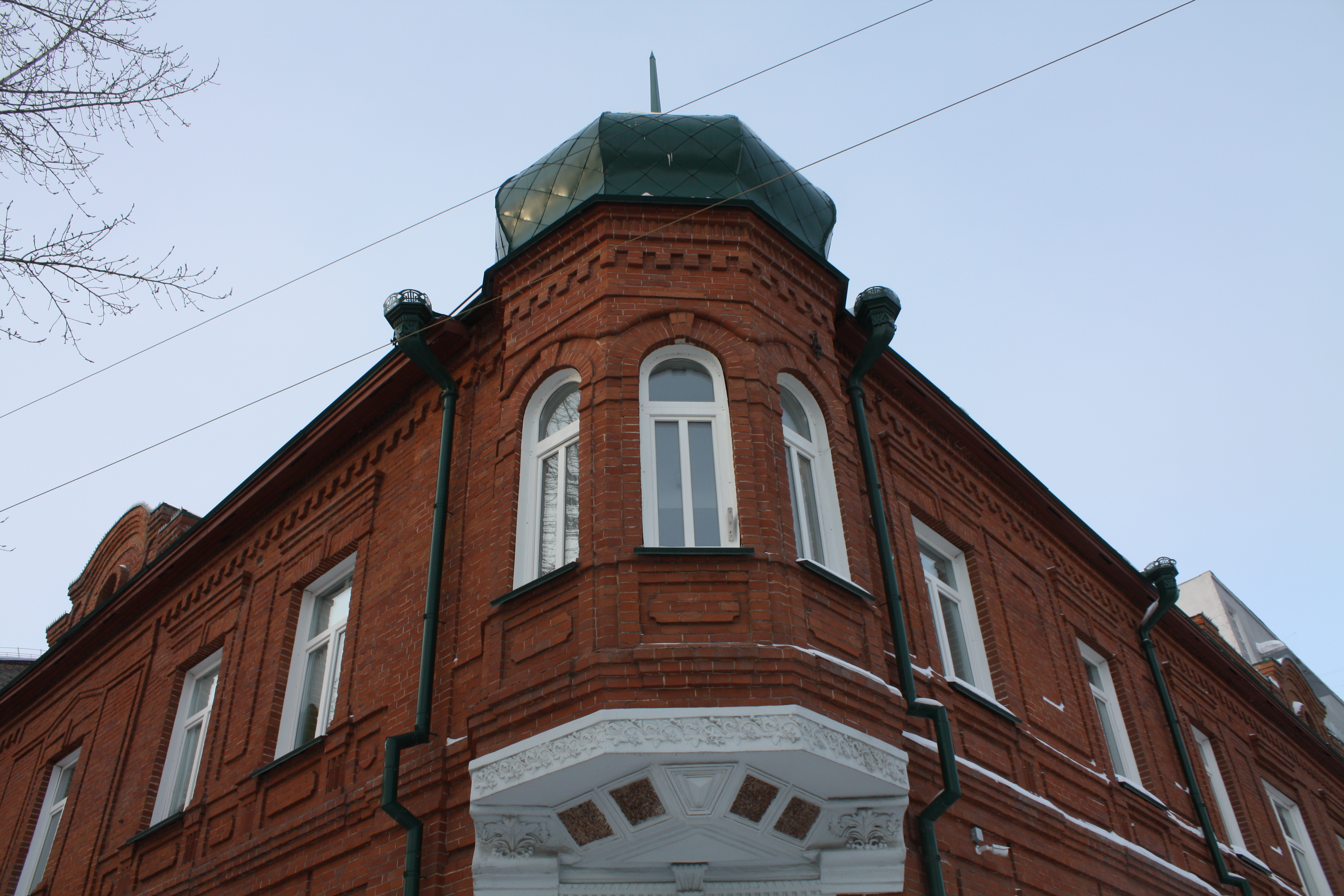
Mashtakov House

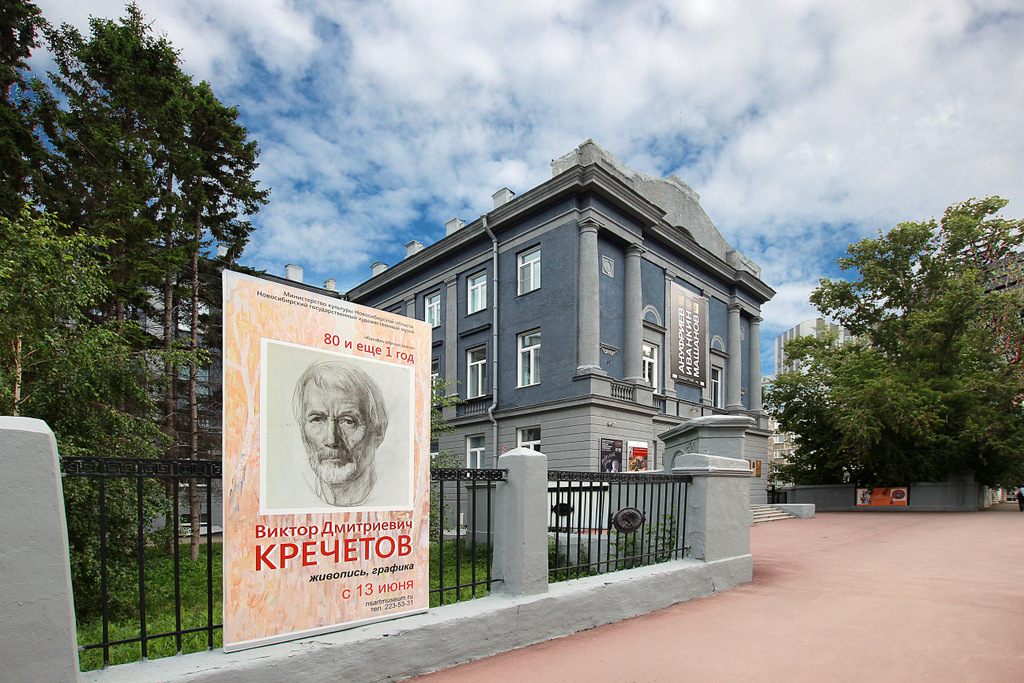
Sibrevcom Building

== Gallery ==
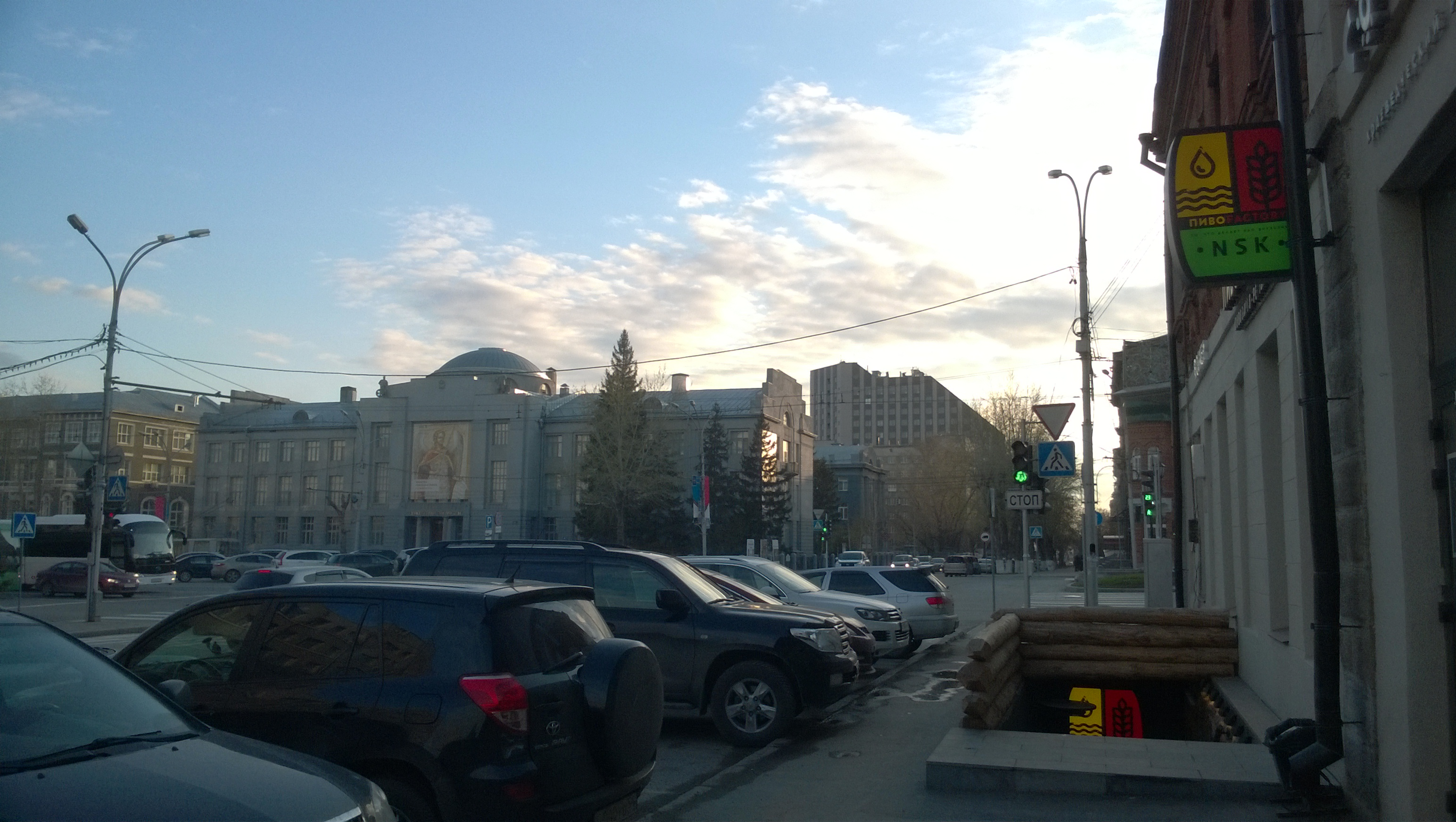

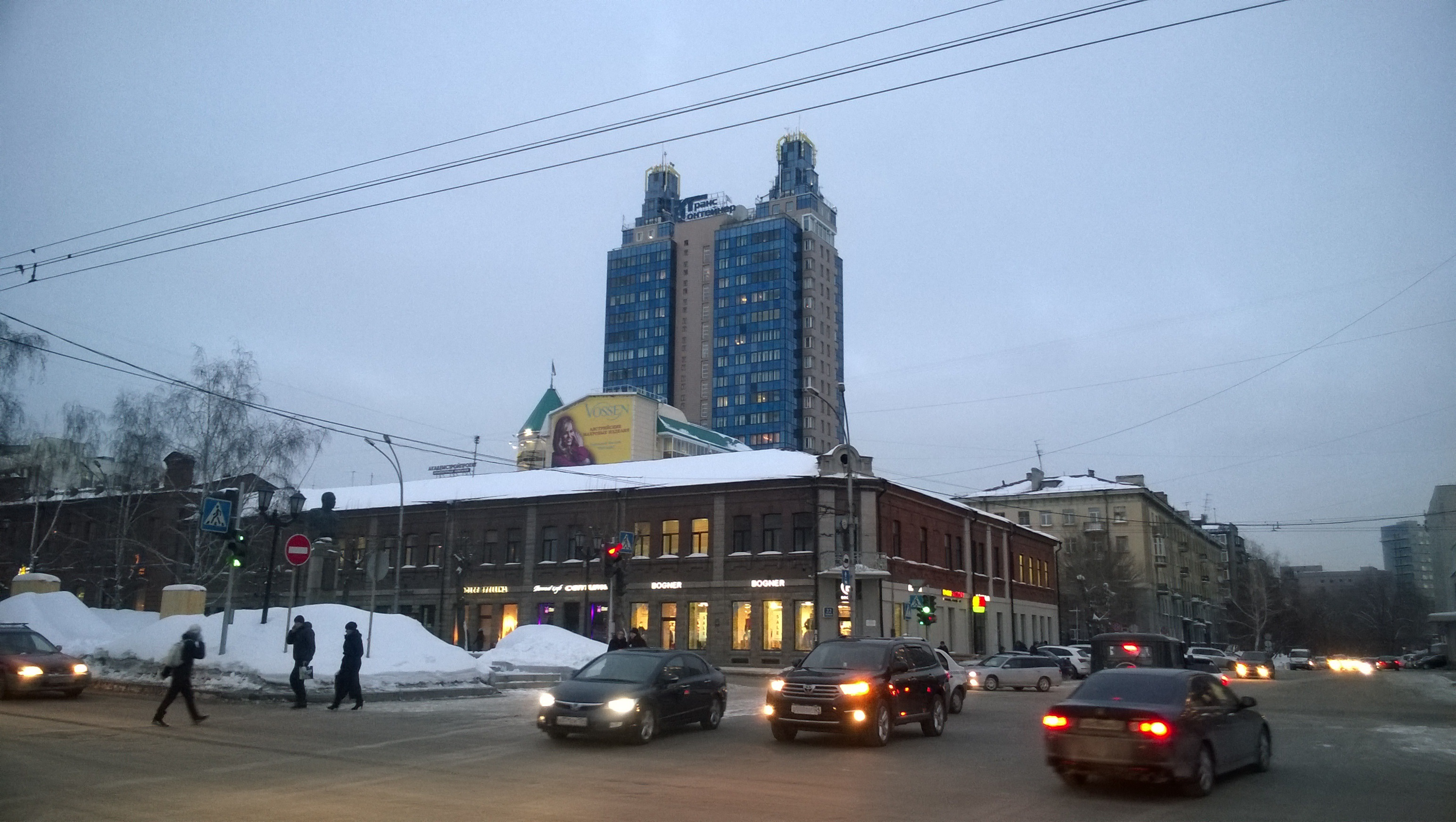
The intersection between Sverdlov Street and Krasny Avenue

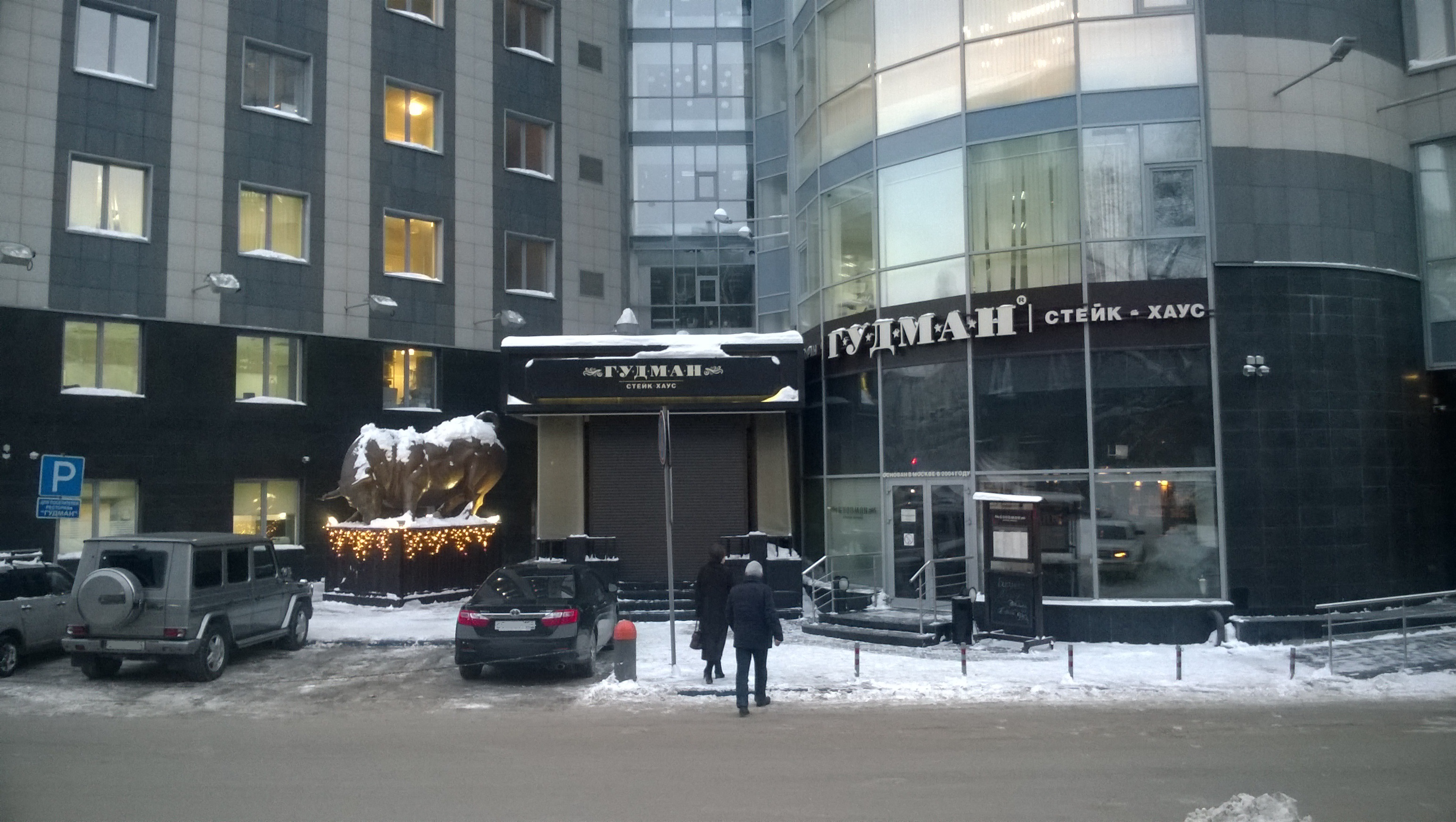

== Organizations ==
- Novosibirsk Oblast Administration
- Novosibirsk State Art School
- Novosibirsk State Oblast Scientific Library
- State Archive of Novosibirsk Oblast
