= Uritsky Street, Novosibirsk =

Street in Novosibirsk, Russia

Uritsky Street
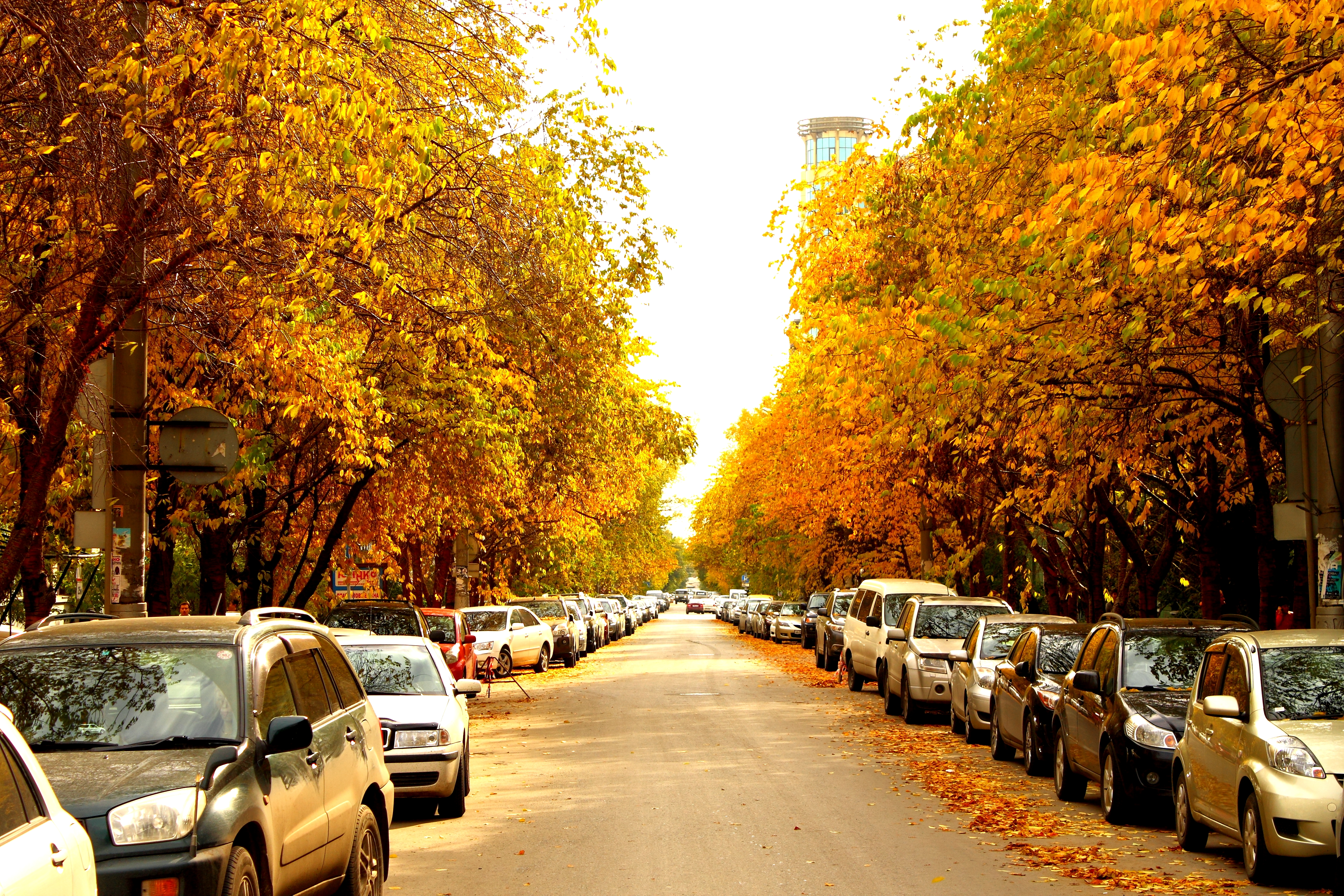
- Native name: Улица Урицкого (Russian)
- Location: Novosibirsk; Russia

Uritsky Street (Russian: Улица Урицкого) is a south-north street in Zheleznodorozhny City District of Novosibirsk, Russia. It starts from Kommunisticheskaya Street, crosses Oktyabrskaya, Chaplygin, Gorky and Lenin streets and then forms an intersection with Vokzalnaya Magistral.

== Architecture ==
- Women's Gimnasium of P. A. Smirnova is a building on the corner of Uritsky and Lenin streets. It was built in 1905.
- Uritsky Street 34 is a residential building built in 1927. Architect: I. A. Burlakov.
- Gosbank Employees Residential Building is a building constructed in 1932–1935. Architect: Andrey Kryachkov.
- Uritsky Street 17 is a building built in the 1930s. The architectural style of the building is a symbiosis of constructivism and Soviet classicism. Architect: A. N. Shiryaiev.
- West Siberian Railway Building is a building on the corner of Vokzalnaya Magistral and Uritsky Street. It was built in 1935. Architects: Vengerov and A. N. Shiryaiev.
- Tomsk Railway Residential Building is a building built in 1935. Architect: A. N. Shiryayev.
- Uritsky Street 35 is a residential building constructed in the second half of the 1930s. Architect: A. I. Loscutov.
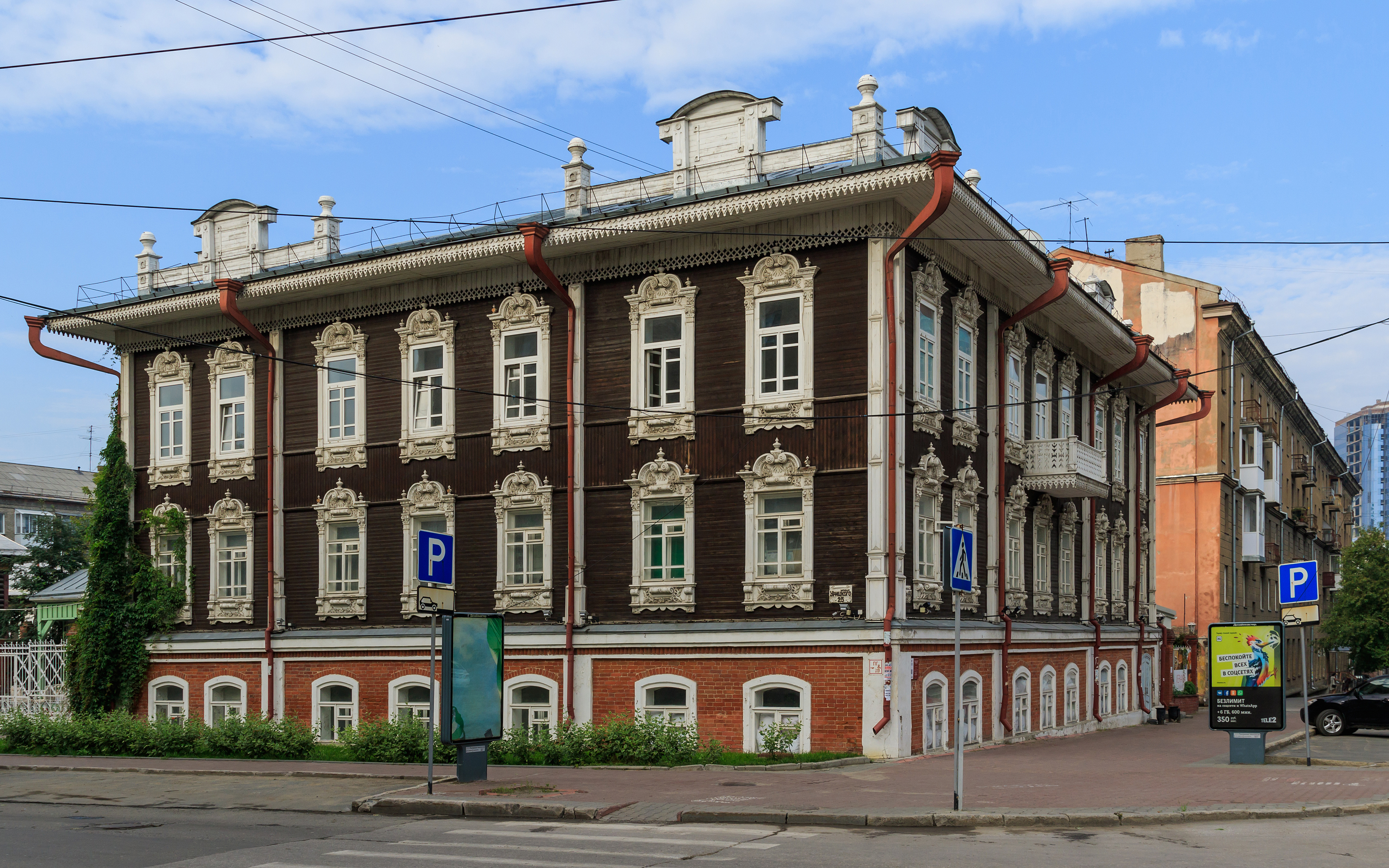
Women's Gimnasium of P. A. Smirnova

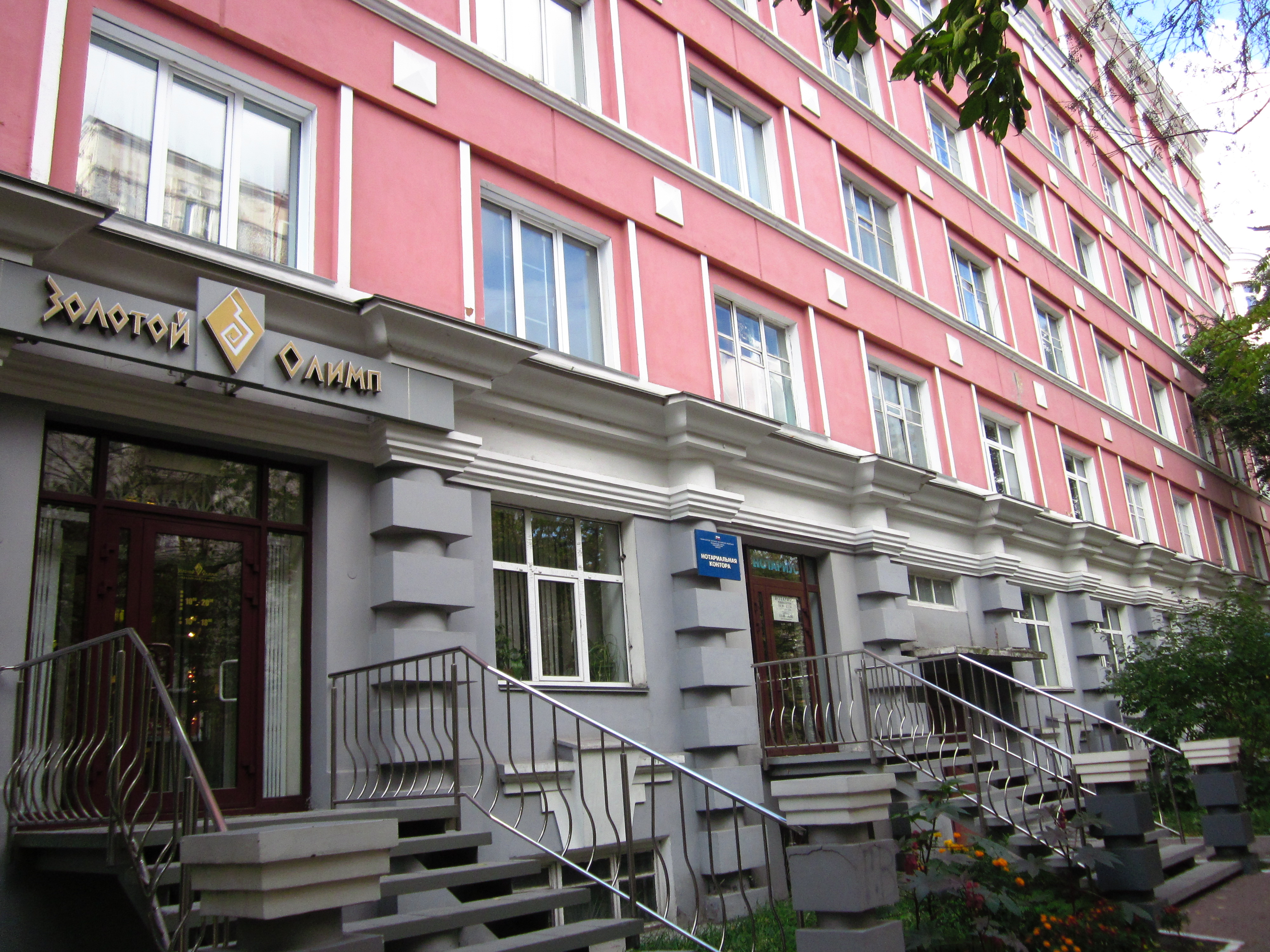
Tomsk Railway Residential Building

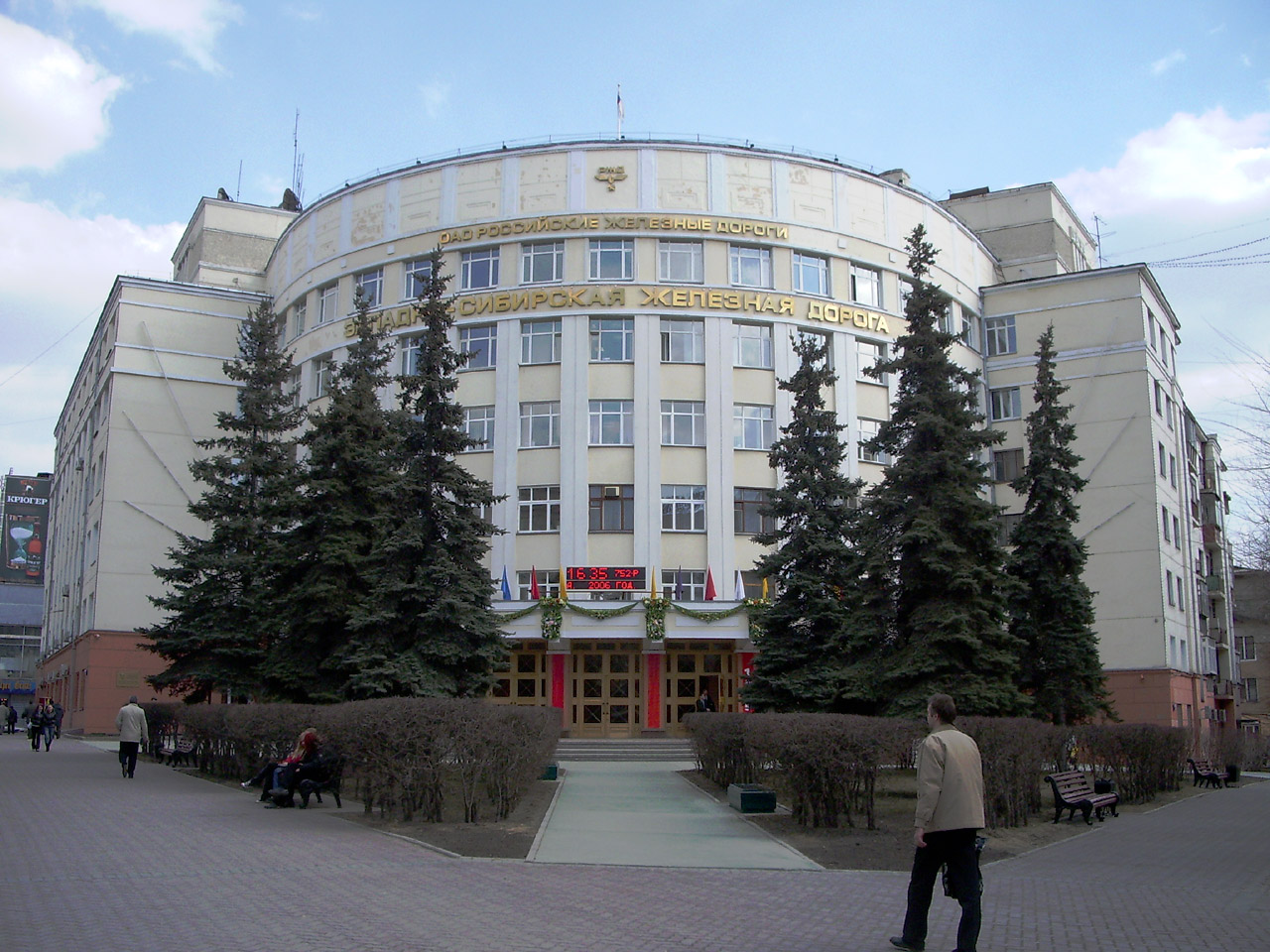
West Siberian Railway Building

=== Demolished buildings ===
- Surikov House is a building built in 1897. It was located on the corner of Uritsky and Deputatskaya streets. The building was demolished in the early 2000s.

== Gallery ==
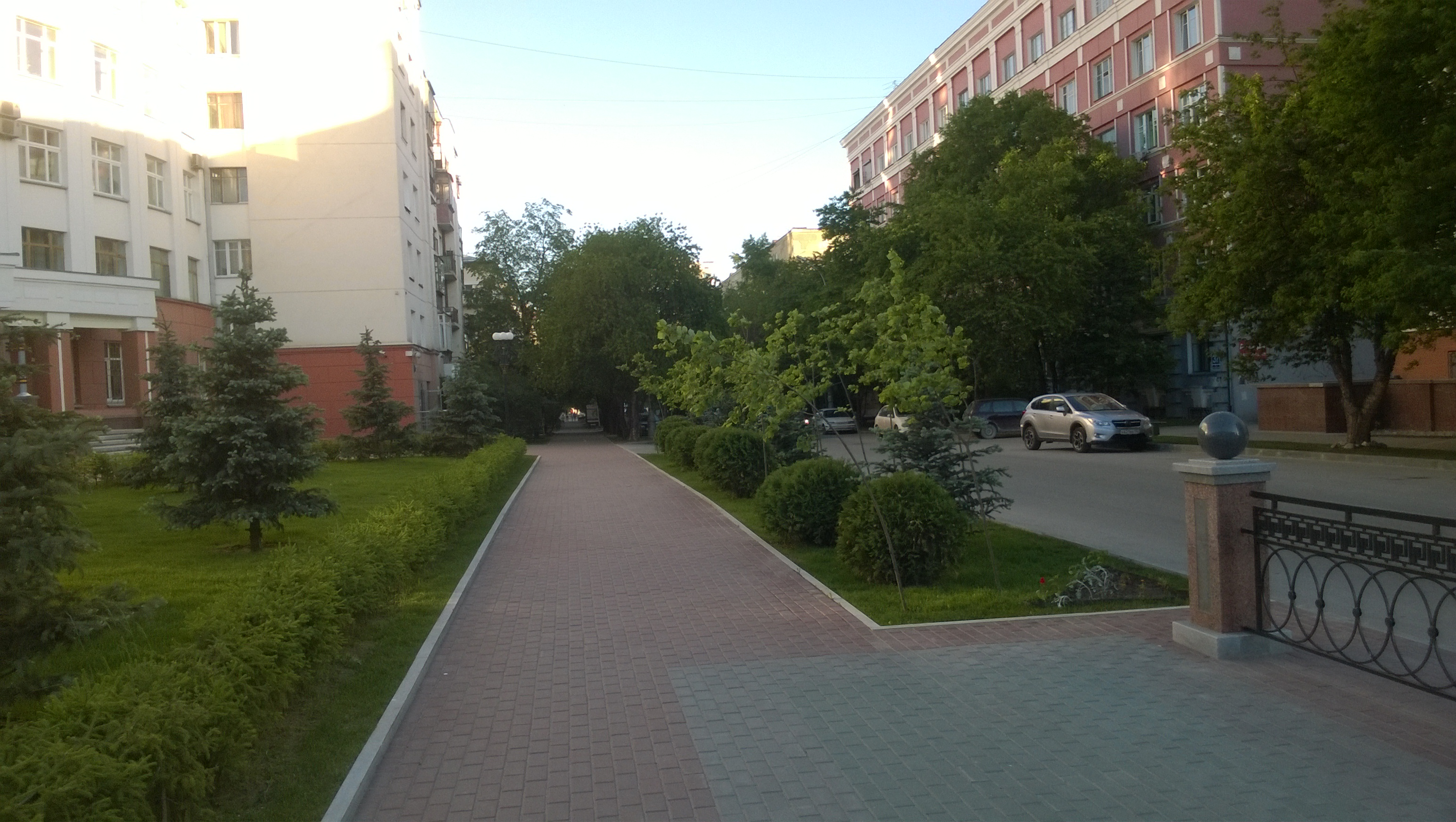

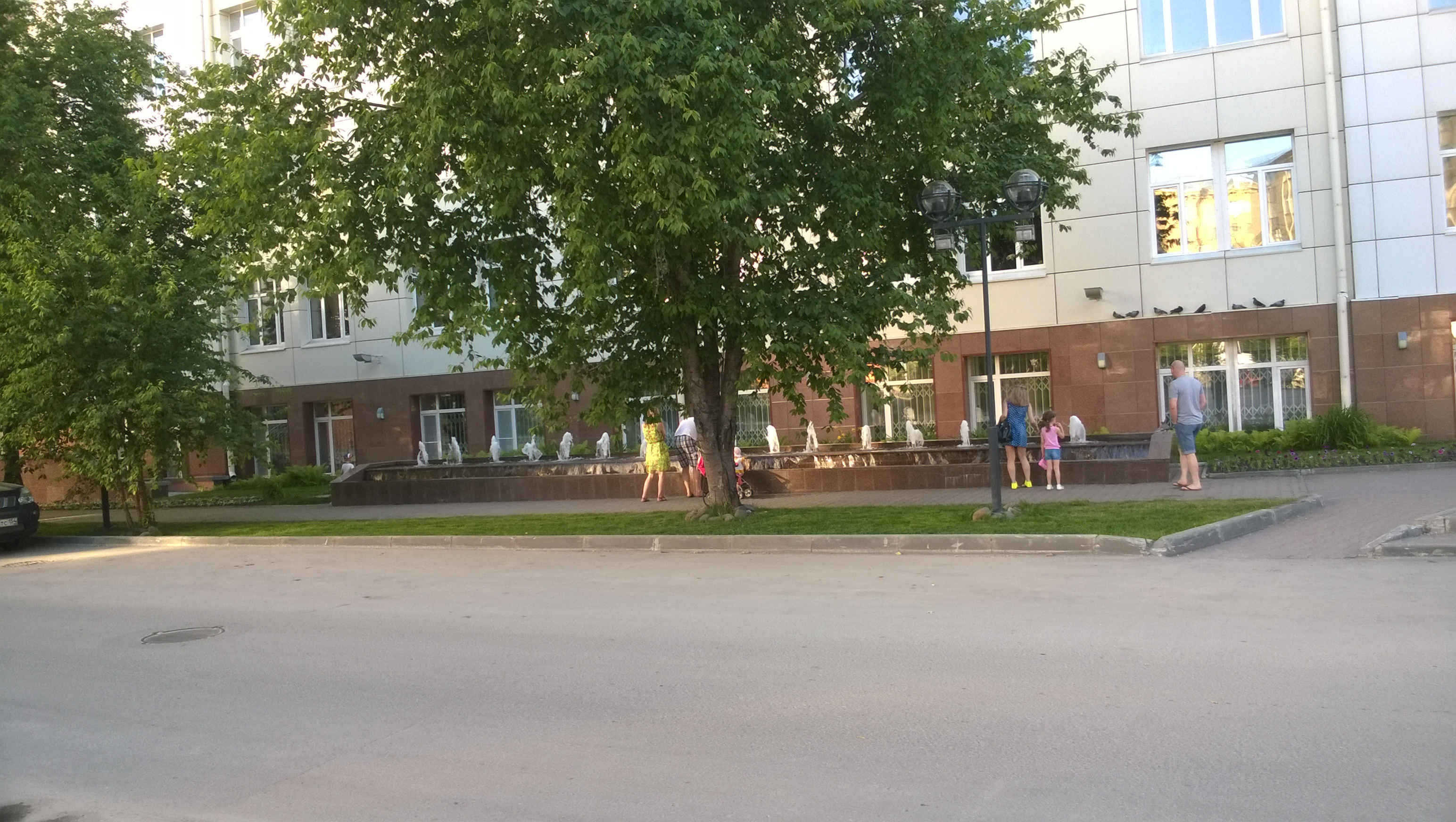

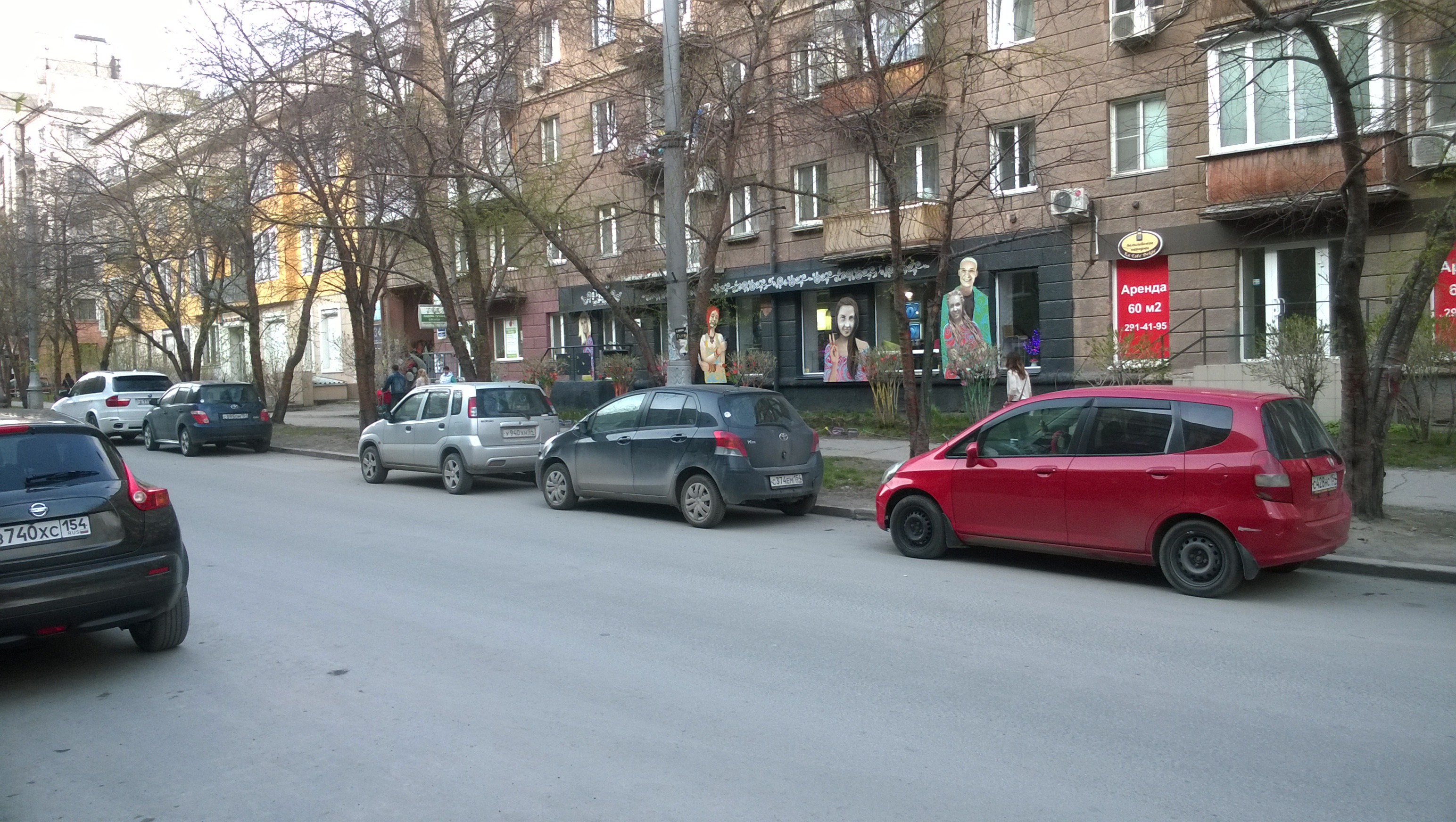

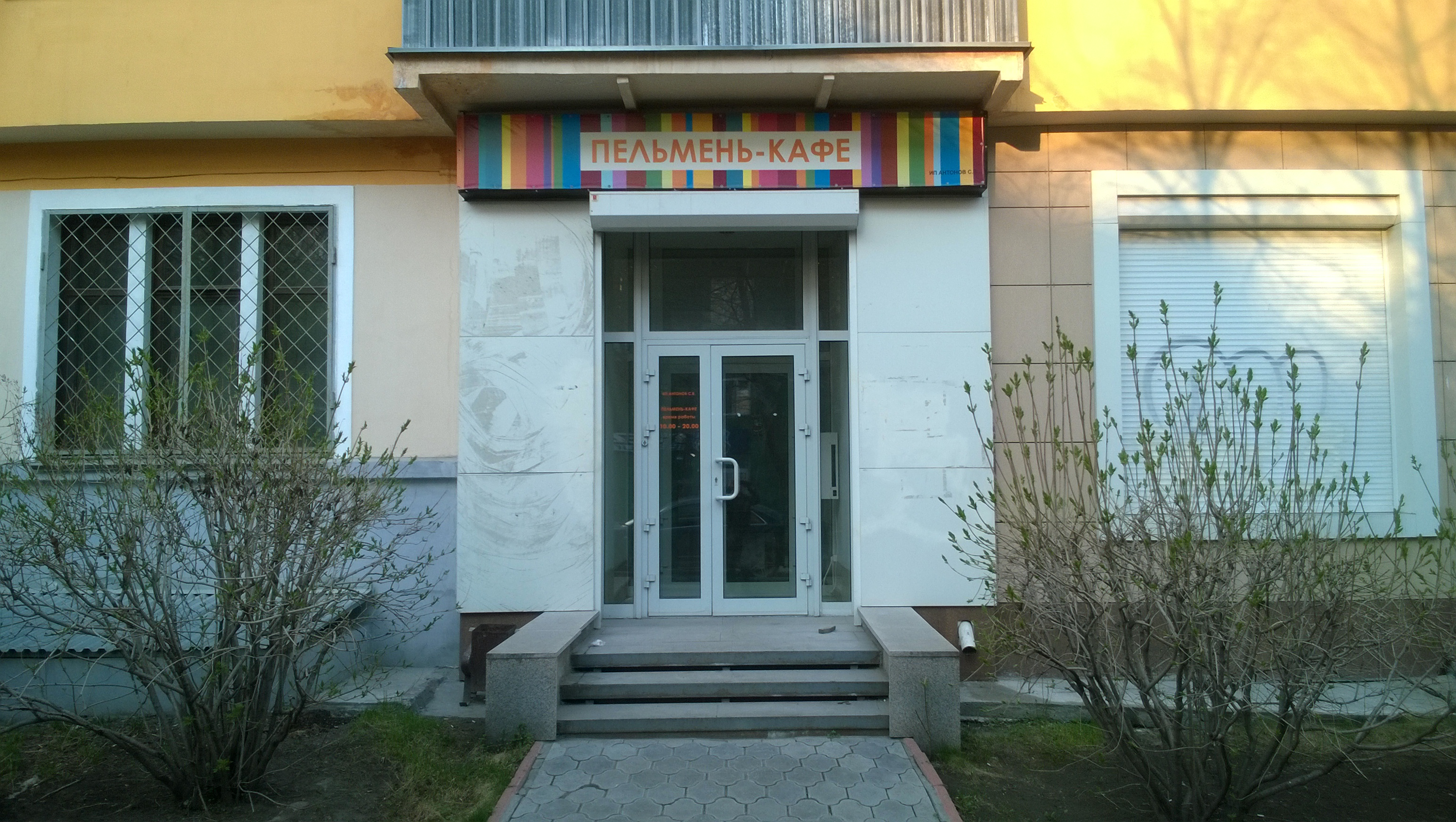

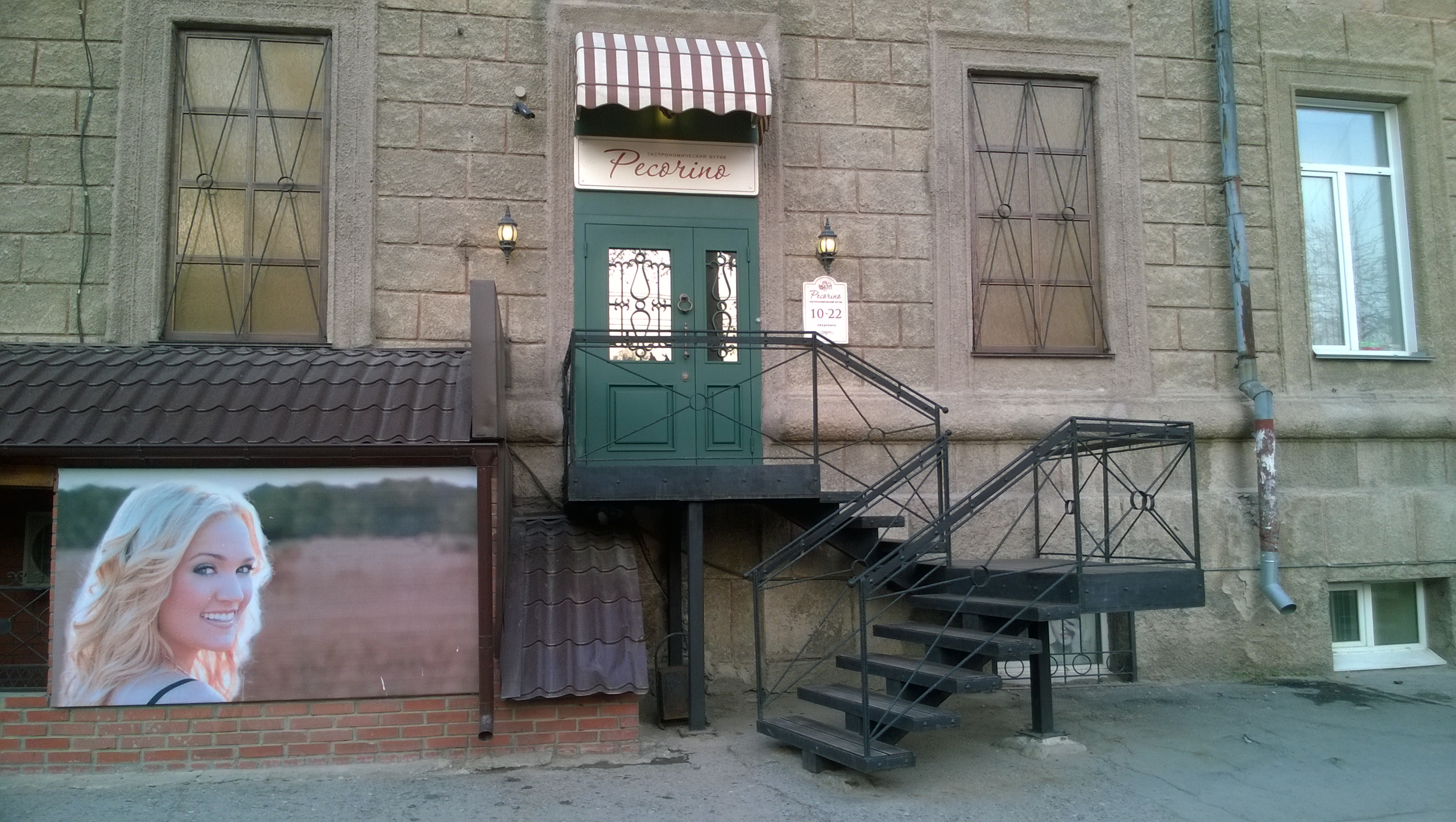

== Facts ==
American architect Michael Mehaffy described the street as a street properly and conveniently organized for people.
