= Narodnaya Letopis (Novonikolayevsk) =

Narodnaya Letopis Народная летопись
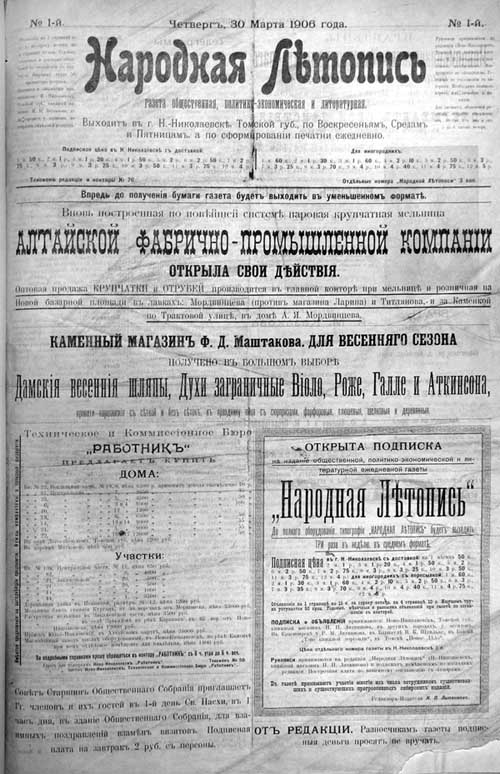
- Founded: 30 March 1906; 120 years ago (officially)
- Ceased publication: 1910
- Language: Russian

The Narodnaya Letopis (Russian: Народная летопись) was the first newspaper of Novonikolayevsk, the Russian Empire. It was published in 1906–1907 and 1909–1910. The founder and first editor of the newspaper was Nikolay Litvinov.

== History ==
The newspaper was initially published on March 30, 1906, coinciding with the elections to the 1st State Duma. However, by 1909–1910, it encountered significant pressure from authorities due to its liberal course. Consequently, the Narodnaya Letopis ceased publication in 1910. The Obskaya Zhizn newspaper is considered the successor to the Narodnaya Letopis.

== Newspaper editors ==
- N. P. Litvinov (1906)
- M. O. Kursky (since No. 21, 1906)
- A. G. Novitsky (1909–1910)

== Charity ==
The editorial team of the Narodnaya Letopis newspaper coordinated a fundraising campaign to support the victims of the Novonikolayevsk Fire of 1909.

== Bibliography ==
- Ламин В. А. (2003). Энциклопедия. Новосибирск. Новосибирск: Новосибирское книжное издательство. p. 554. ISBN 5-7620-0968-8.
