= Kopylov House =

Building in Novosibirsk, Russia

- Дом Копылова
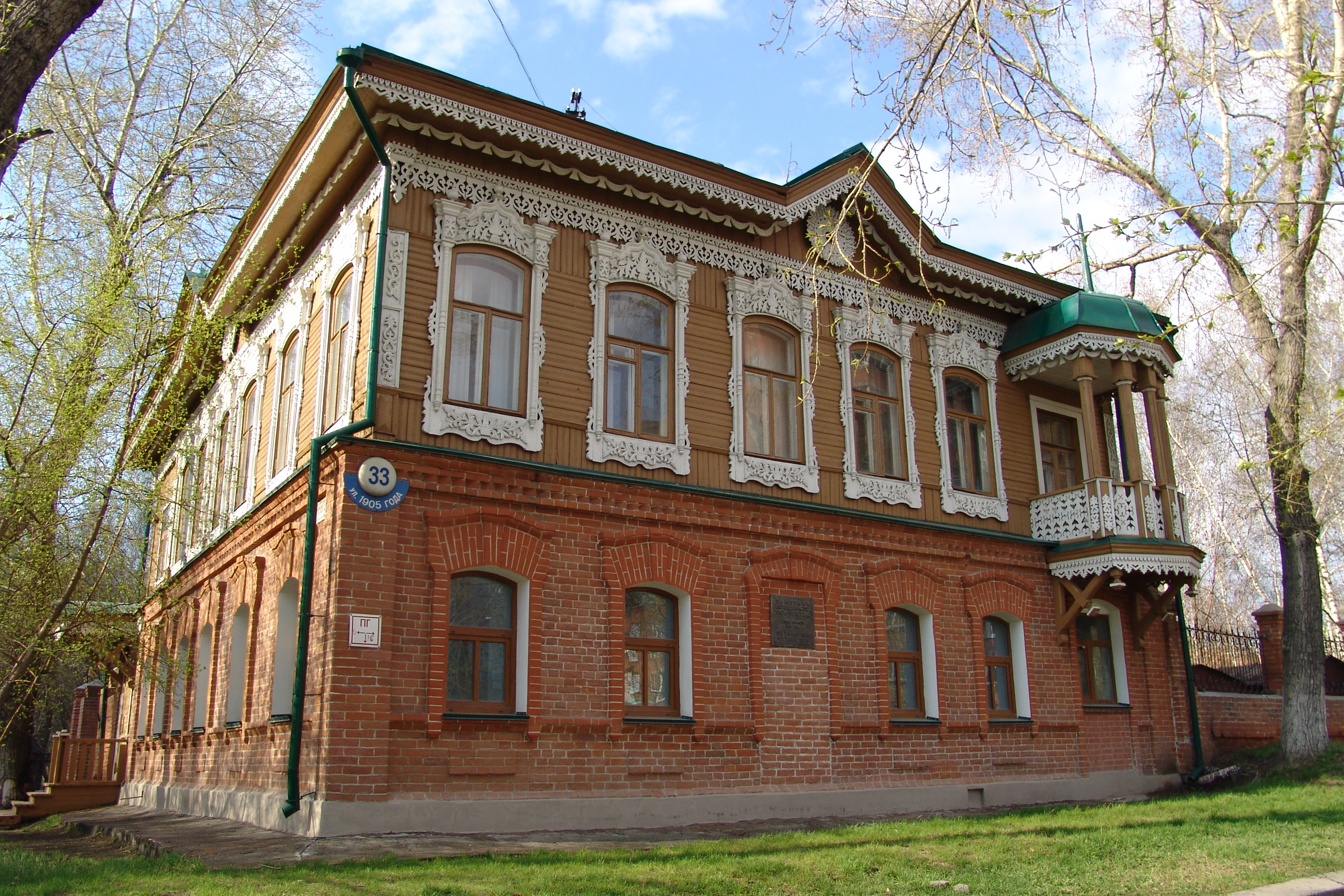
- Interactive map of the Kopylov House area

General information
- Location: Krasnoyarskaya Street 112, Novosibirsk, Russia
- Completed: 1901

Kopylov House (Russian: Дом Копылова) is a building in Zheleznodorozhny City District of Novosibirsk, Russia. It is located on Krasnoyarskaya Street. The building was constructed in 1901.

== History ==
The Kopylov House was built in 1901 and belonged to Rodion Martemyanovich Kopylov, who headed the Union of the Russian People (Novonikolayevsk department).

== Interior ==
The original round ovens are preserved in the interior of the building.

== Gallery ==
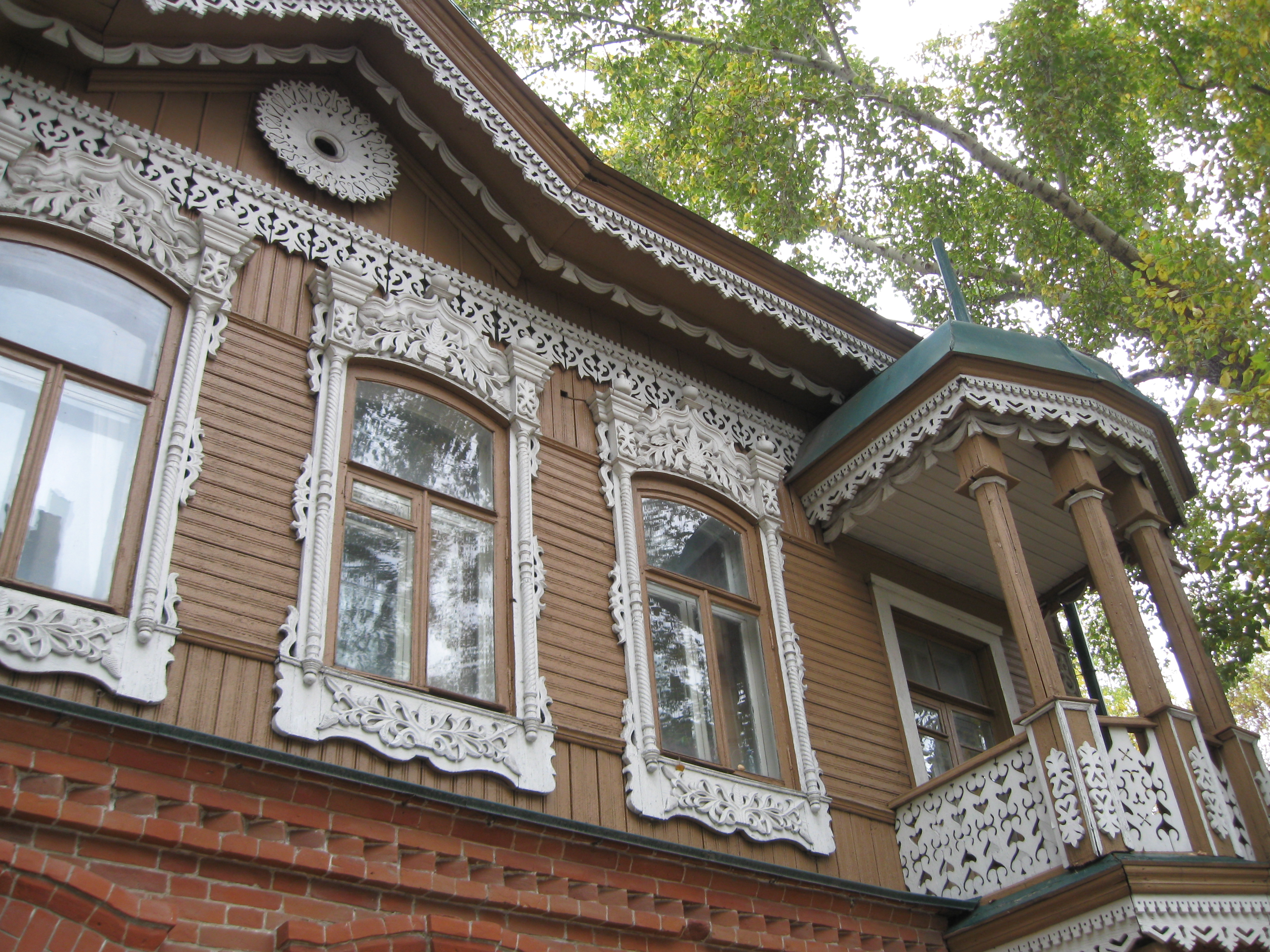

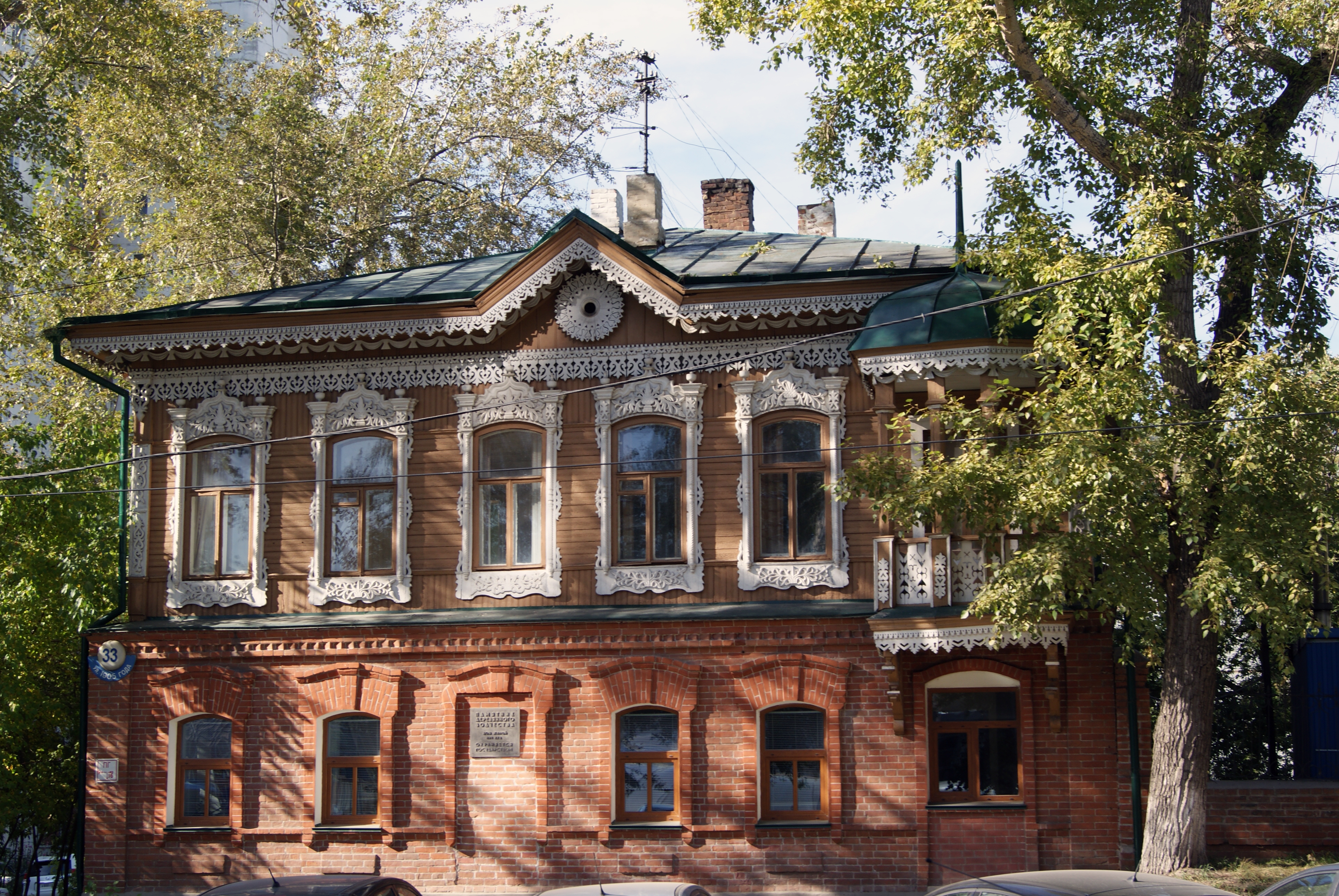

== See also ==
- Ikonnikova House
- Zedain House
