= Ikonnikova House =

Building in Novosibirsk, Russia

Coordinates: 55.02536°N 82.91639°E

- Дом Иконниковой
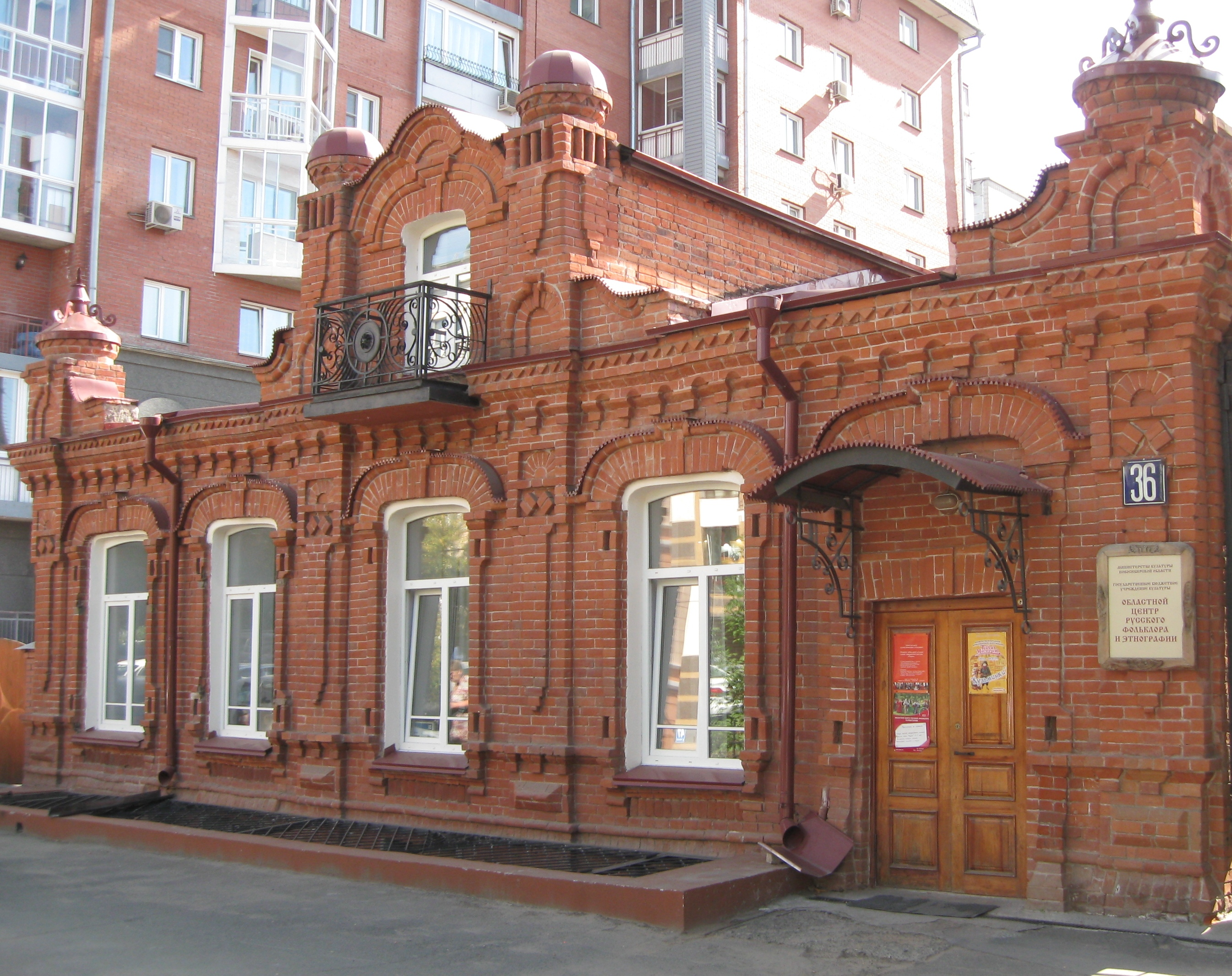
- Interactive map of the Ikonnikova House area

General information
- Architectural style: Art Nouveau
- Location: Chaplygin Street 36, Novosibirsk, Russia
- Completed: 1900s

Ikonnikova House or House with the Mezzanine (Russian: Дом Иконниковой) is an Art Nouveau-style building in Zheleznodorozhny City District of Novosibirsk, Russia. It is located on Chaplygin Street. The building was built in the early 1900s.

== History ==
The place where the house is located belonged to the trading house of E. G. Ikonnikova.

In the 1980s, the house was occupied by the Terpsichora Dance Society.

== See also ==
- Kryukov House
- Zedain House
- Zhernakova House
