= Gorky Street, Novosibirsk =

Street in Novosibirsk, Russia

Gorky Street
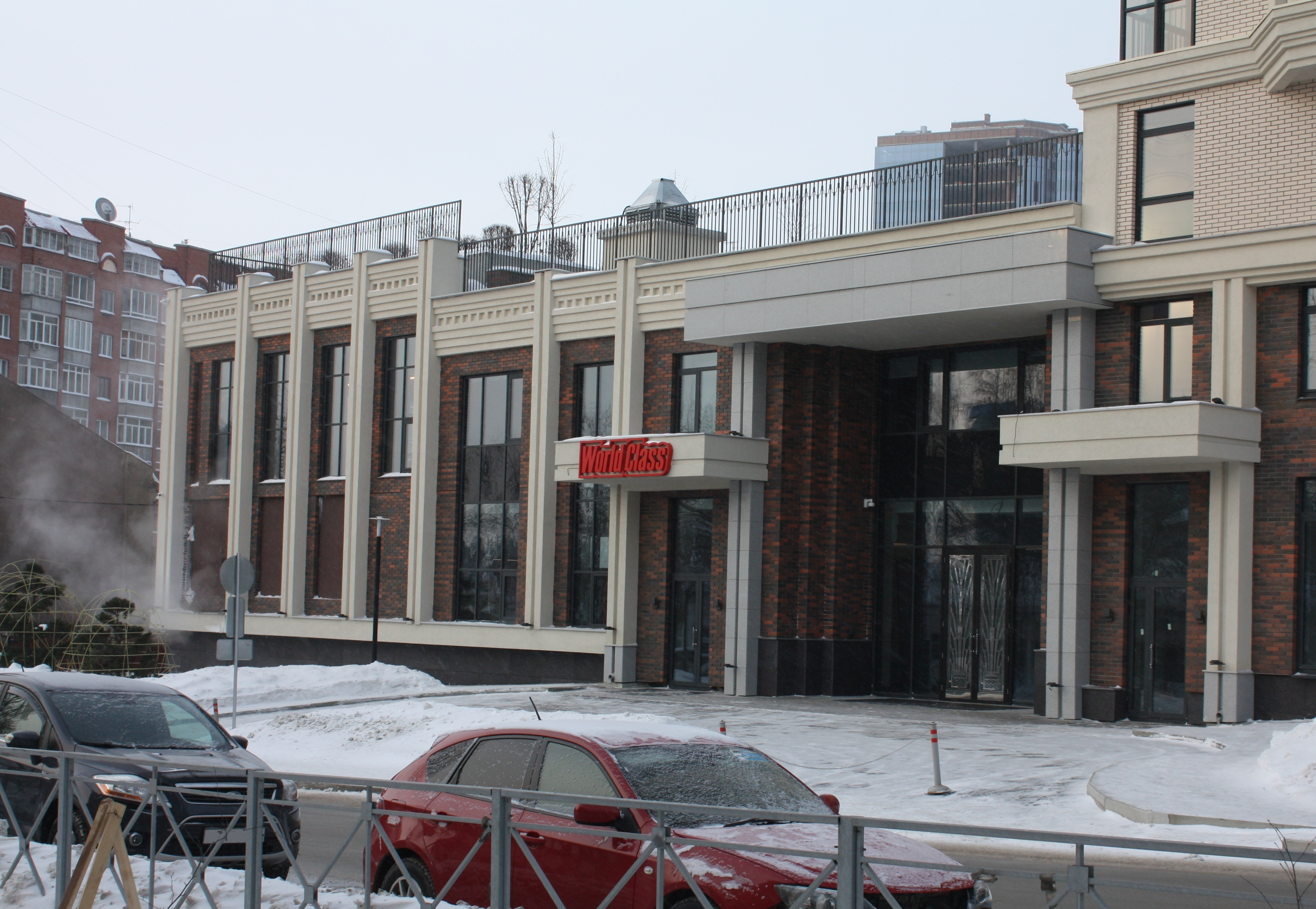
- Interactive map of Gorky Street
- Native name: Улица Горького (Russian)
- Location: Novosibirsk; Russia

Maxim Gorky Street (Russian: Улица Максима Горького) is an east–west street in Zheleznodorozhny and Tsentralny districts of Novosibirsk, Russia. The street starts from nameless passage connecting Gorky Street with Dimitrov Avenue, crosses Street of Revolution, Uritsky and Sovetskaya streets, Krasny Avenue, Serebrennikovskaya, Kamenskaya and Shamshin Family streets. The street ends in city block opposite the Aura Mall.

== History ==
The street was previously called the Tobizenovskaya Street, in 1920 it was renamed in honor of Maxim Gorky.

== Gallery ==
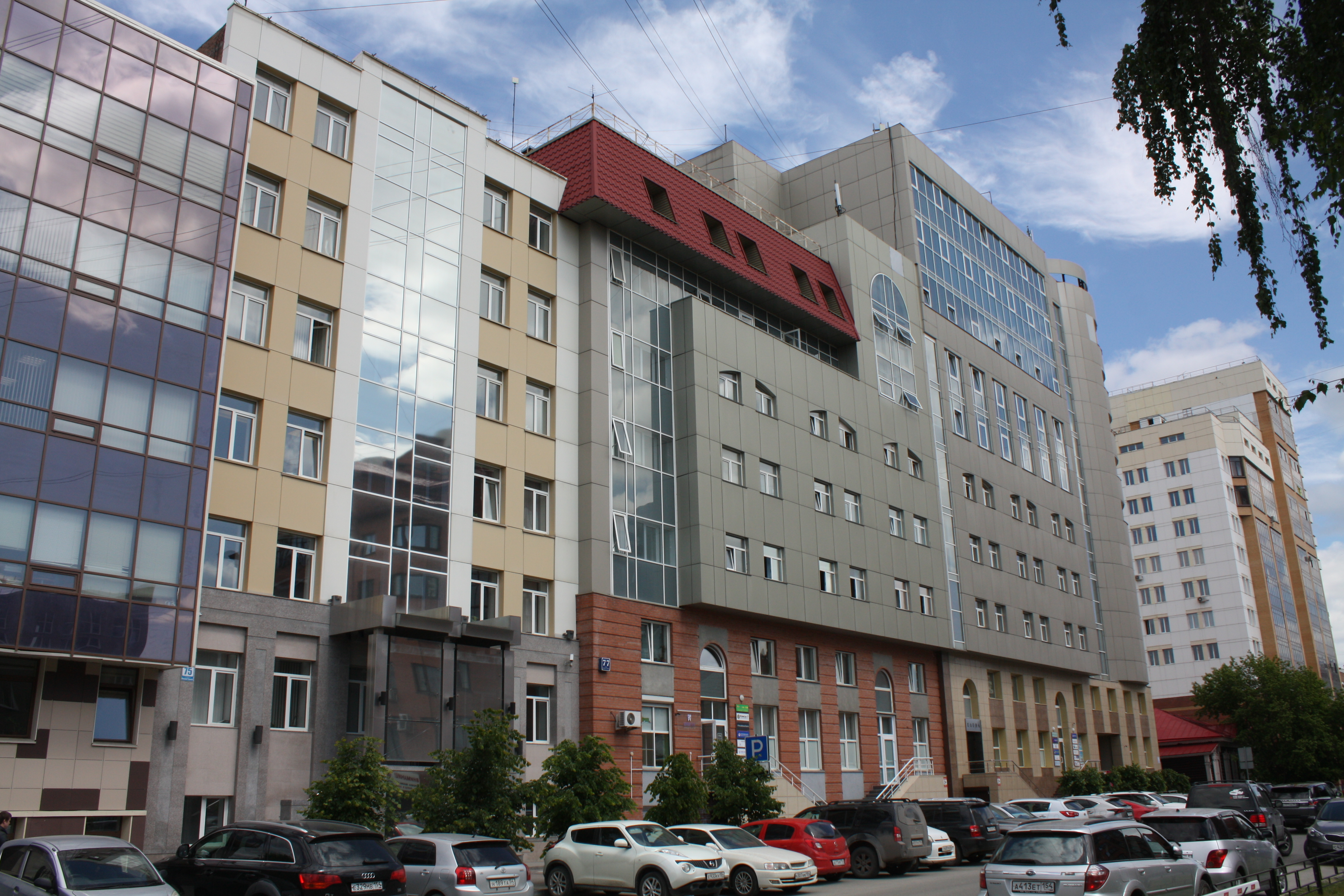

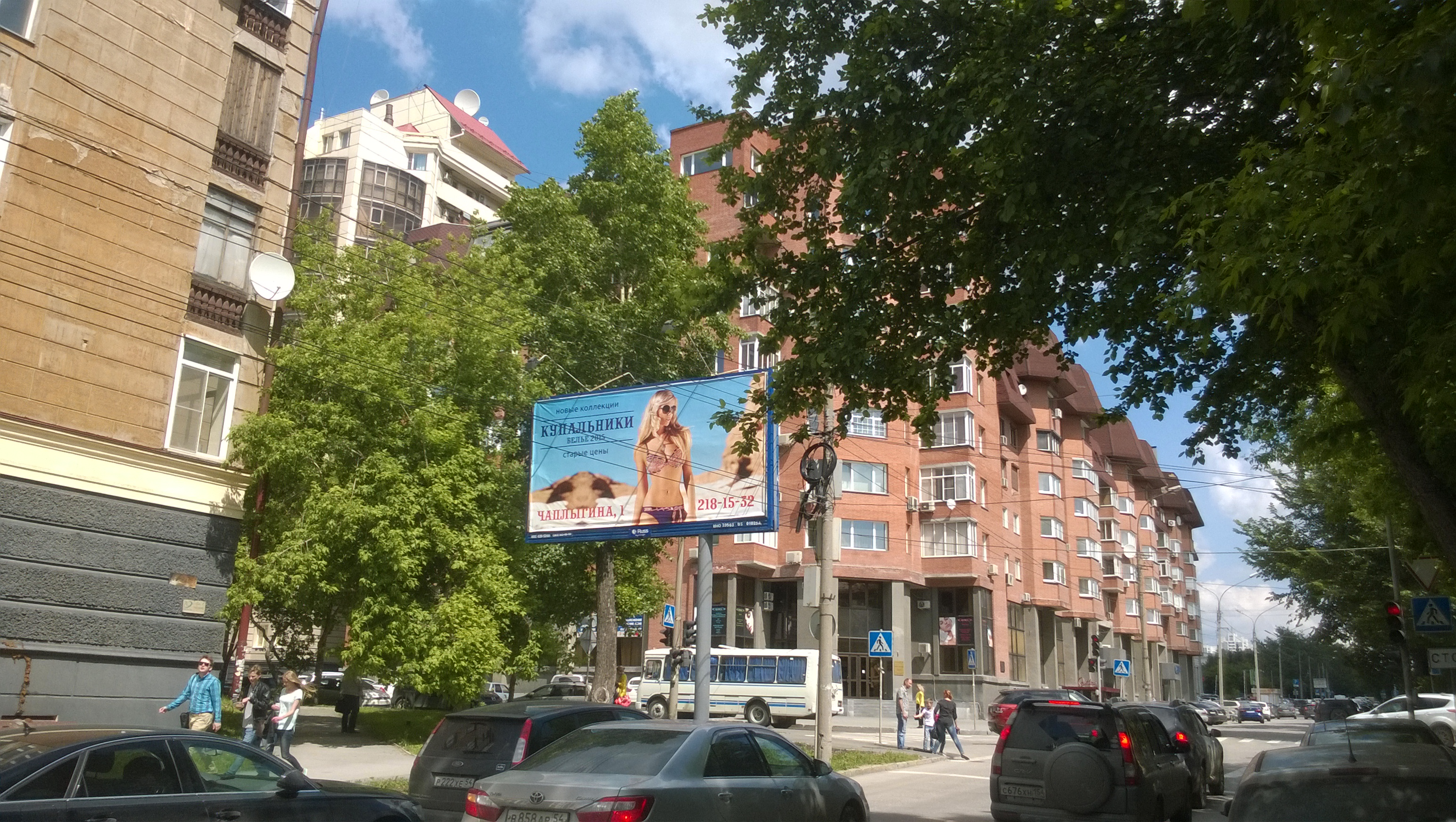

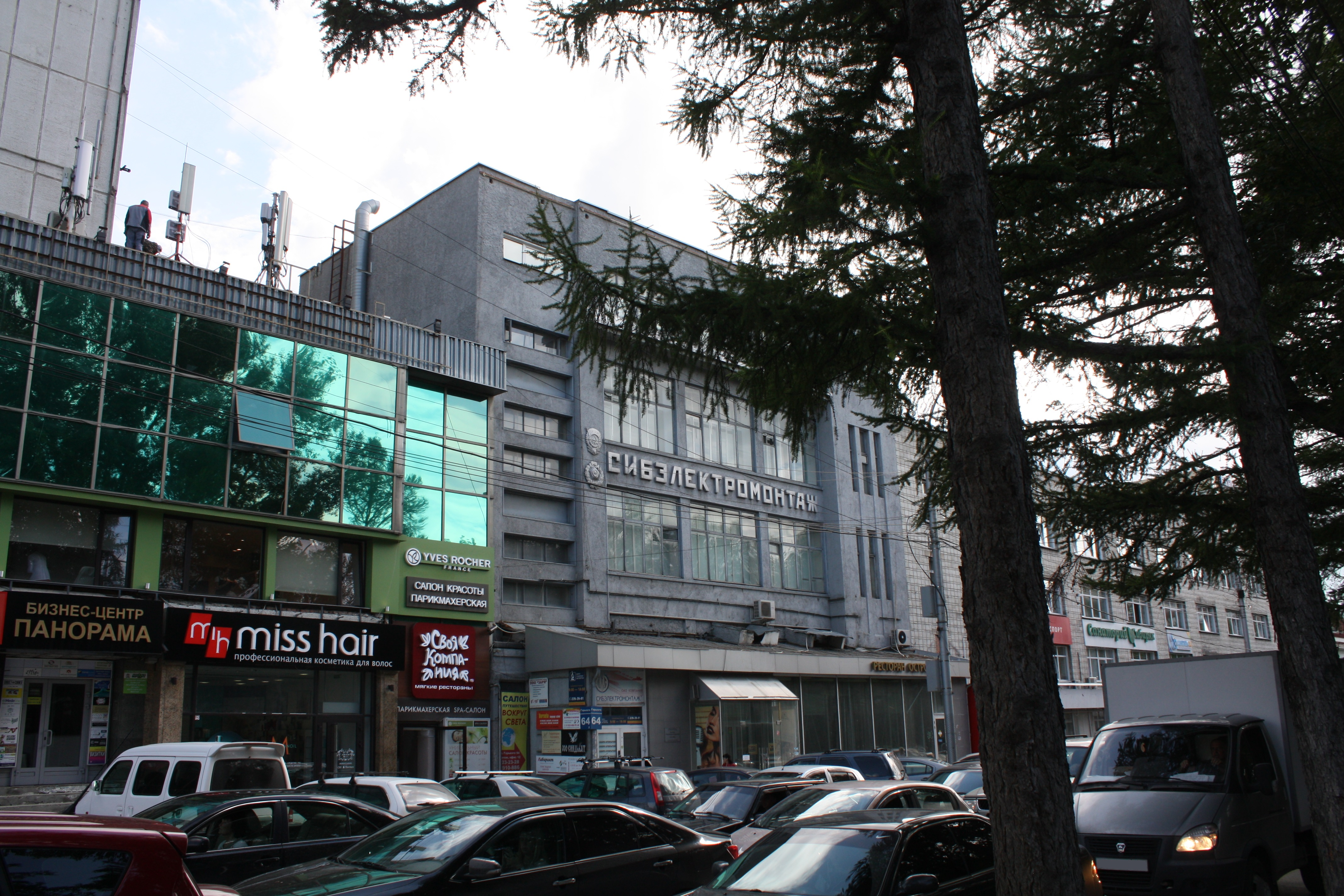

== Architecture ==
=== Tsarist period ===
- Verkhovaya House is a wooden house built in 1908.
- Gorky Street 81 is a wooden house built in 1910
- Kryukov House is a building on the corner of Sovetskaya and Gorky streets. It was built in 1908 by merchant Kryukov.

==== Preserved architectural ensemble of three wooden houses ====
- Gorky Street 16 is a wooden house built in 1917.
- Gorky Street 18 is a wooden house built in the early 20th century
- Gorky Street 20 is a wooden house built in the late 1890s.
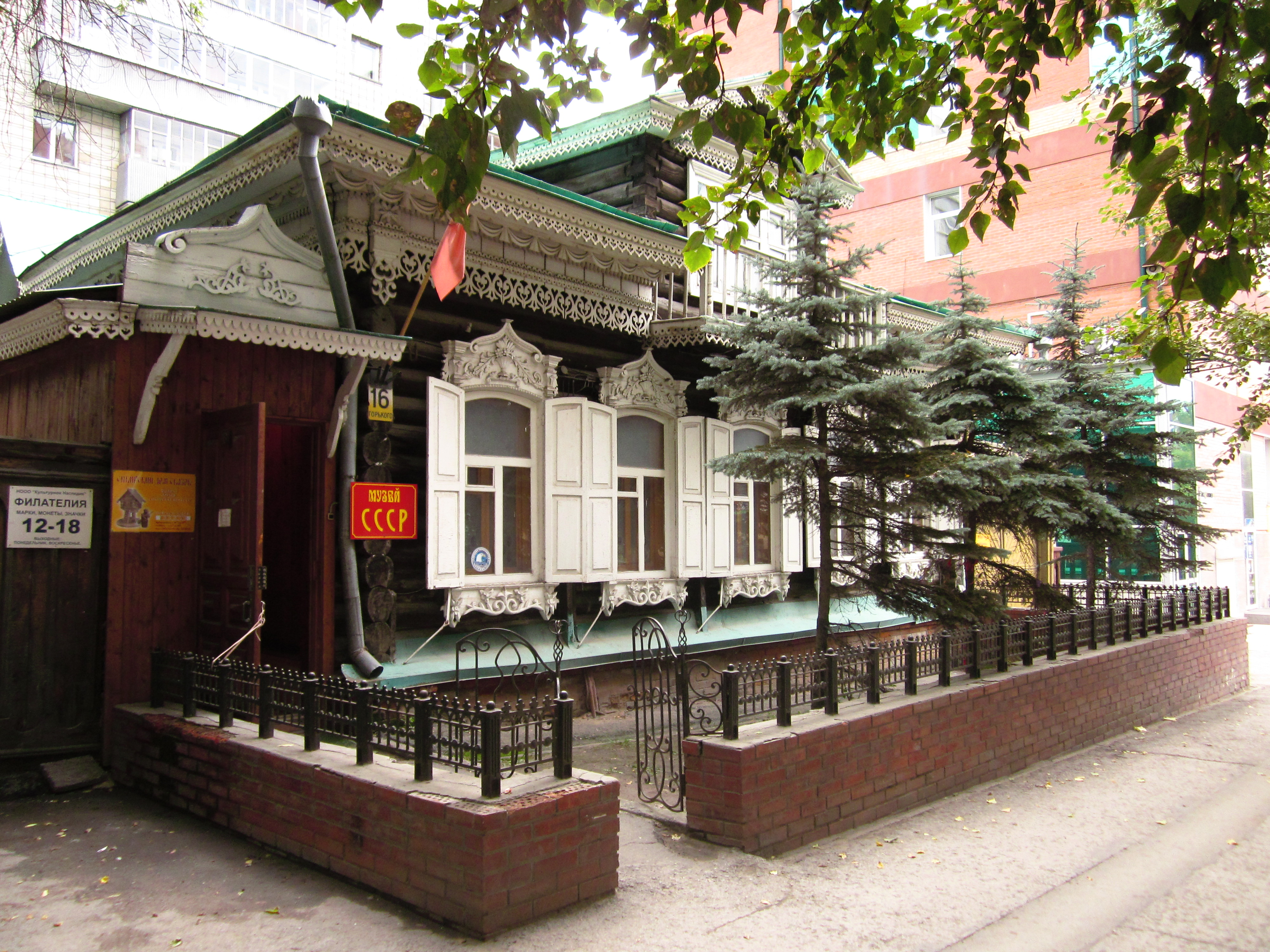
Gorky Street 16

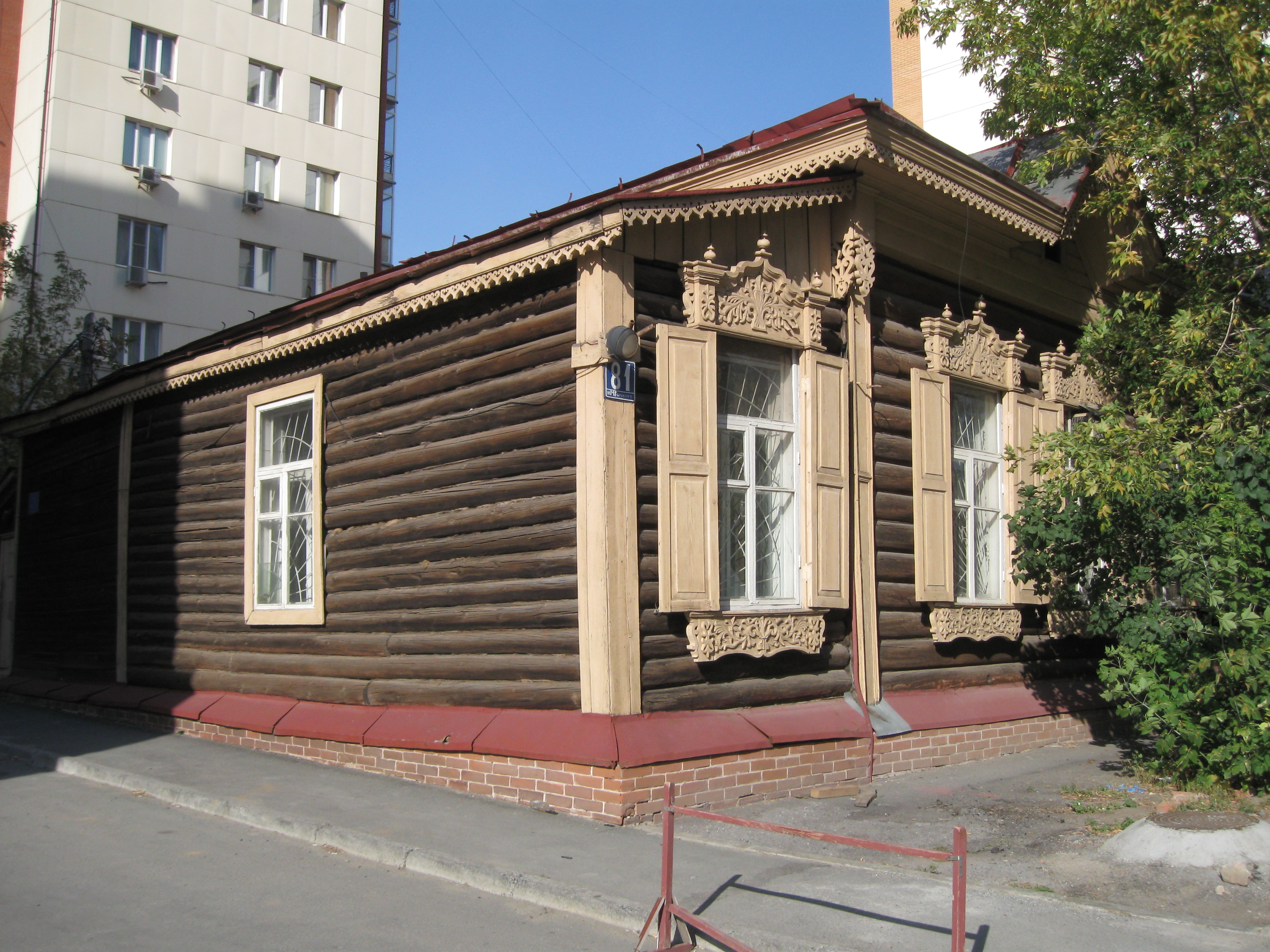
Gorky Street 81

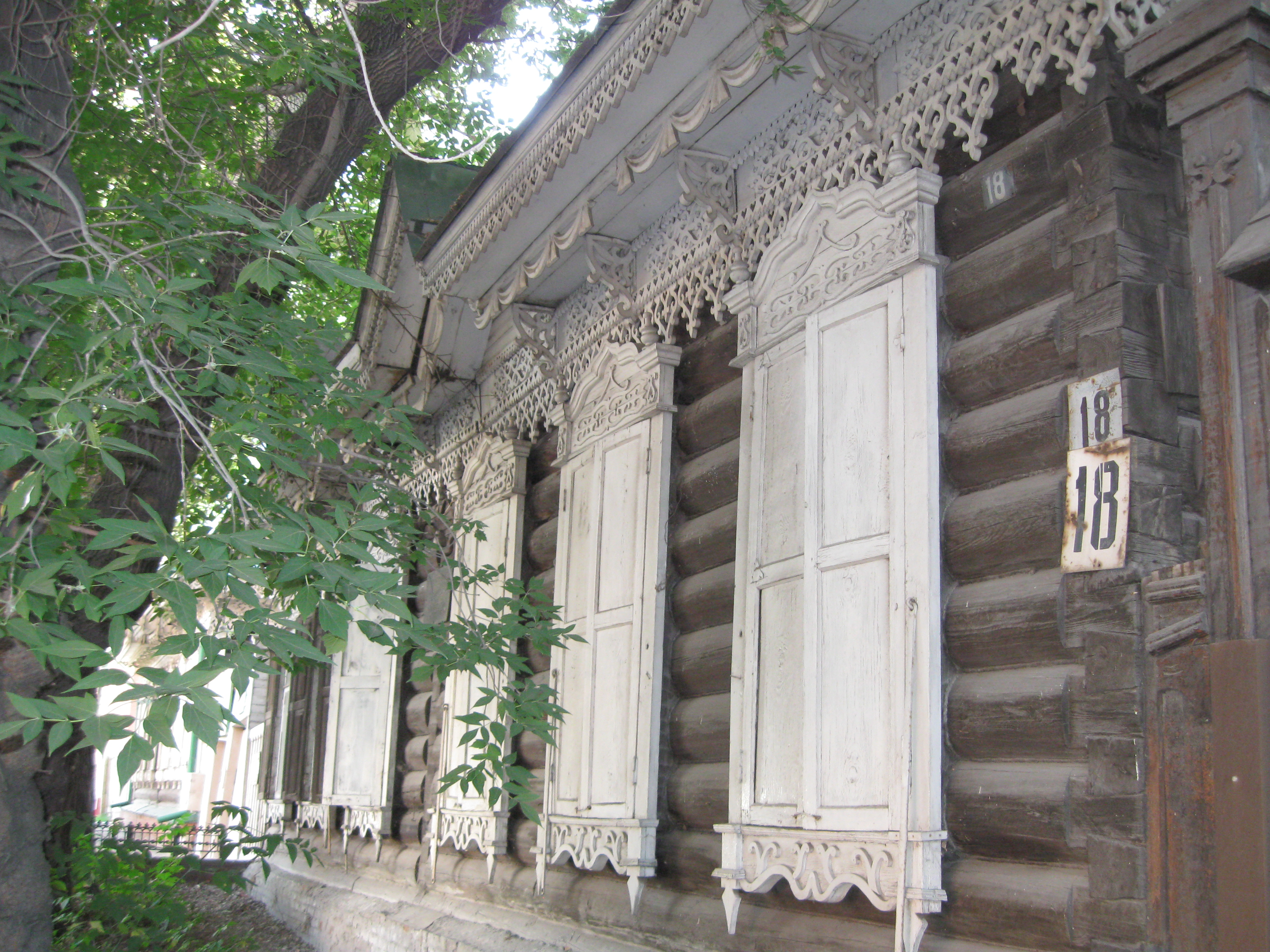
Gorky Street 18

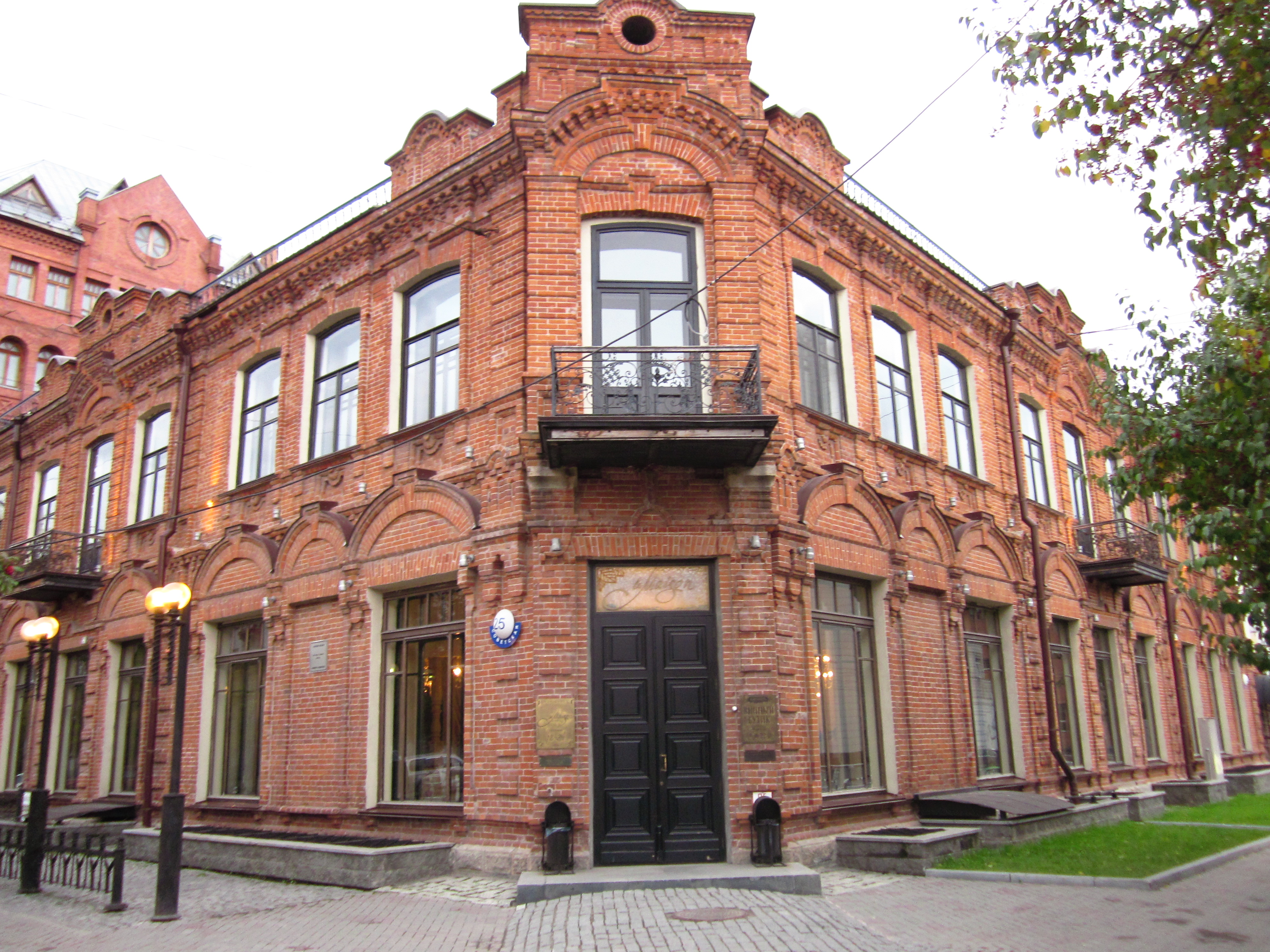
Kryukov House

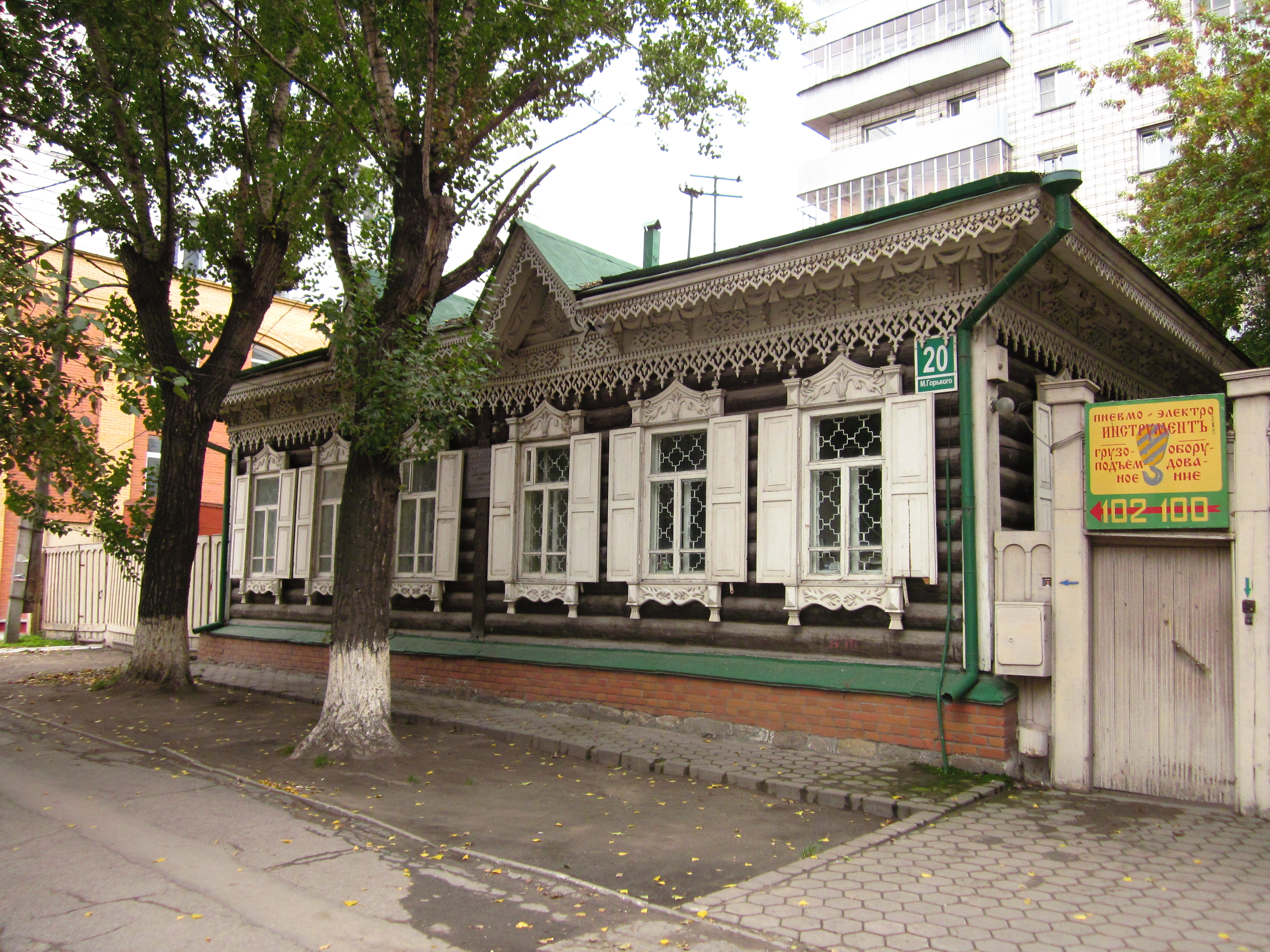
Gorky Street 20

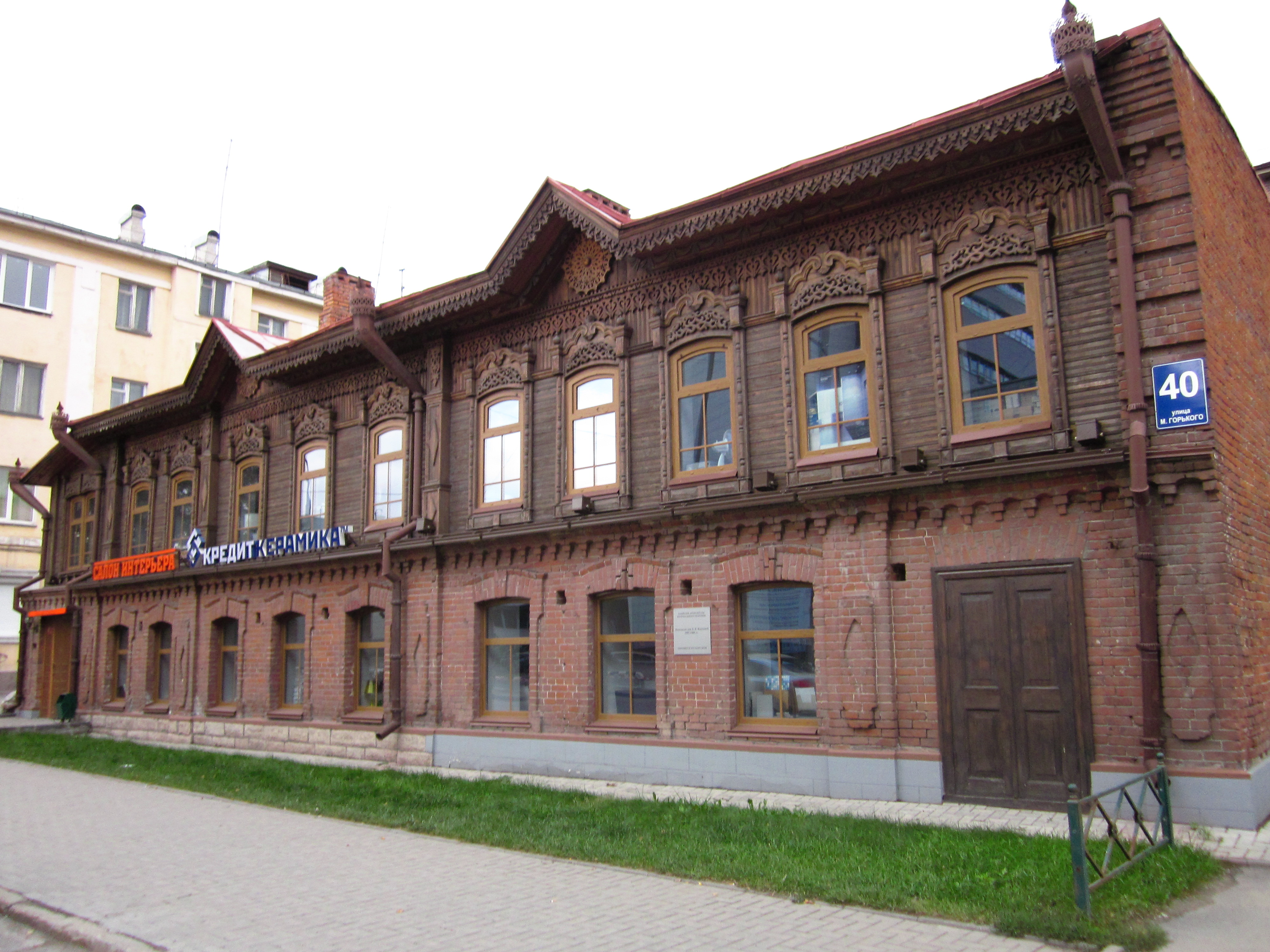
Verkhovaya House

=== Soviet period ===
- Goselektrosindikat Building (Sibelektromontazh Building) is a constructivist building. It was built in 1929.
- Gosbank Employees' Residential Building is a building on the corner of Gorky and Uritsky streets. It was built in 1932–1935. Architect: Andrey Kryachkov.
- Pioner Cinema is a cinema building built in 1935.
- House of Socialist Agriculture. The building is located between Gorky Street, Oktyabrskaya Magistral and Krasny Avenue. It was built in 1936. Architects: Nikolay Kuzmin, Nikolay Vasilyev.
- Gorky Street 26a is a house built in 1940.
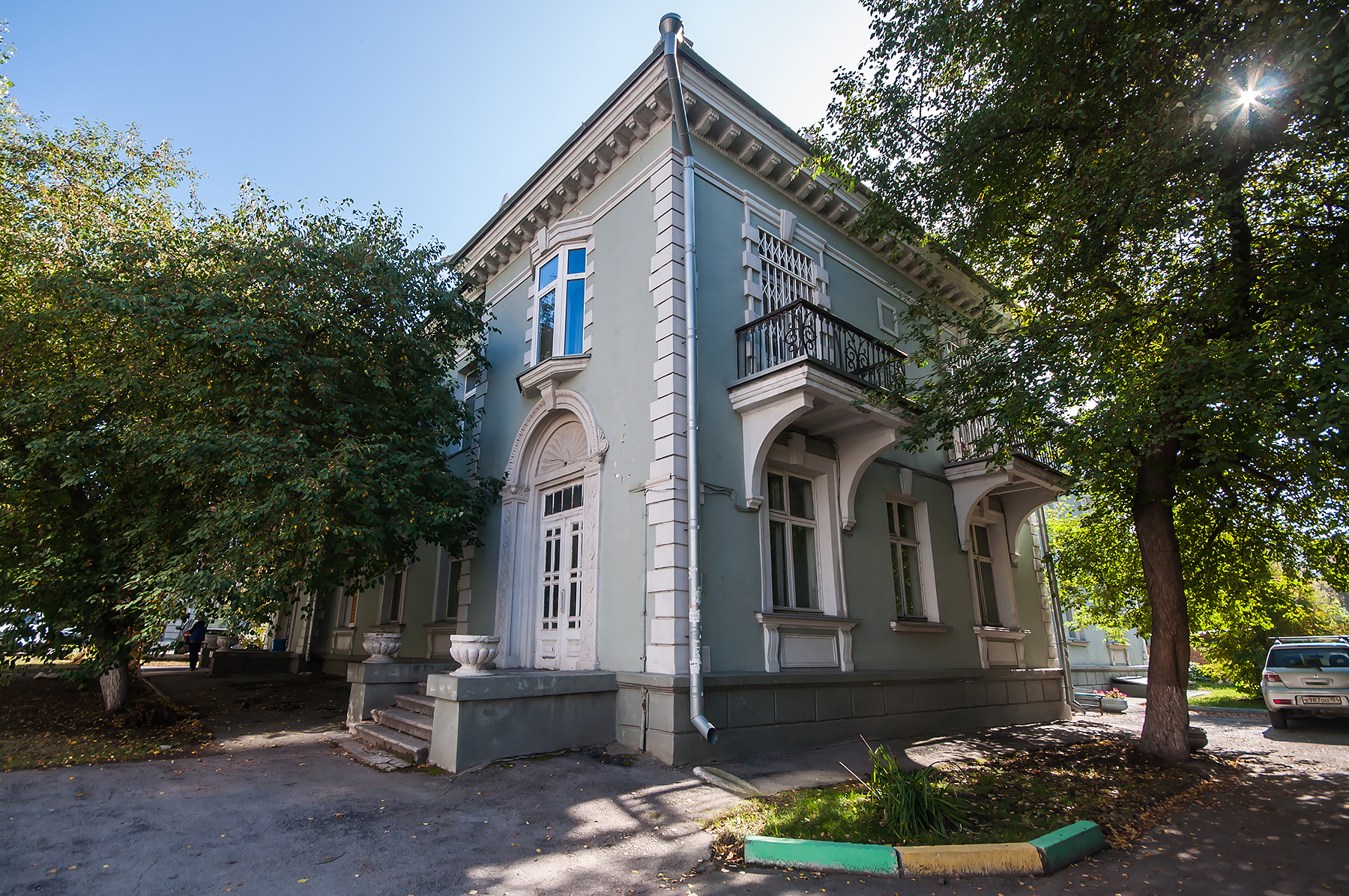
Gorky Street 26a

=== Post-Soviet period ===
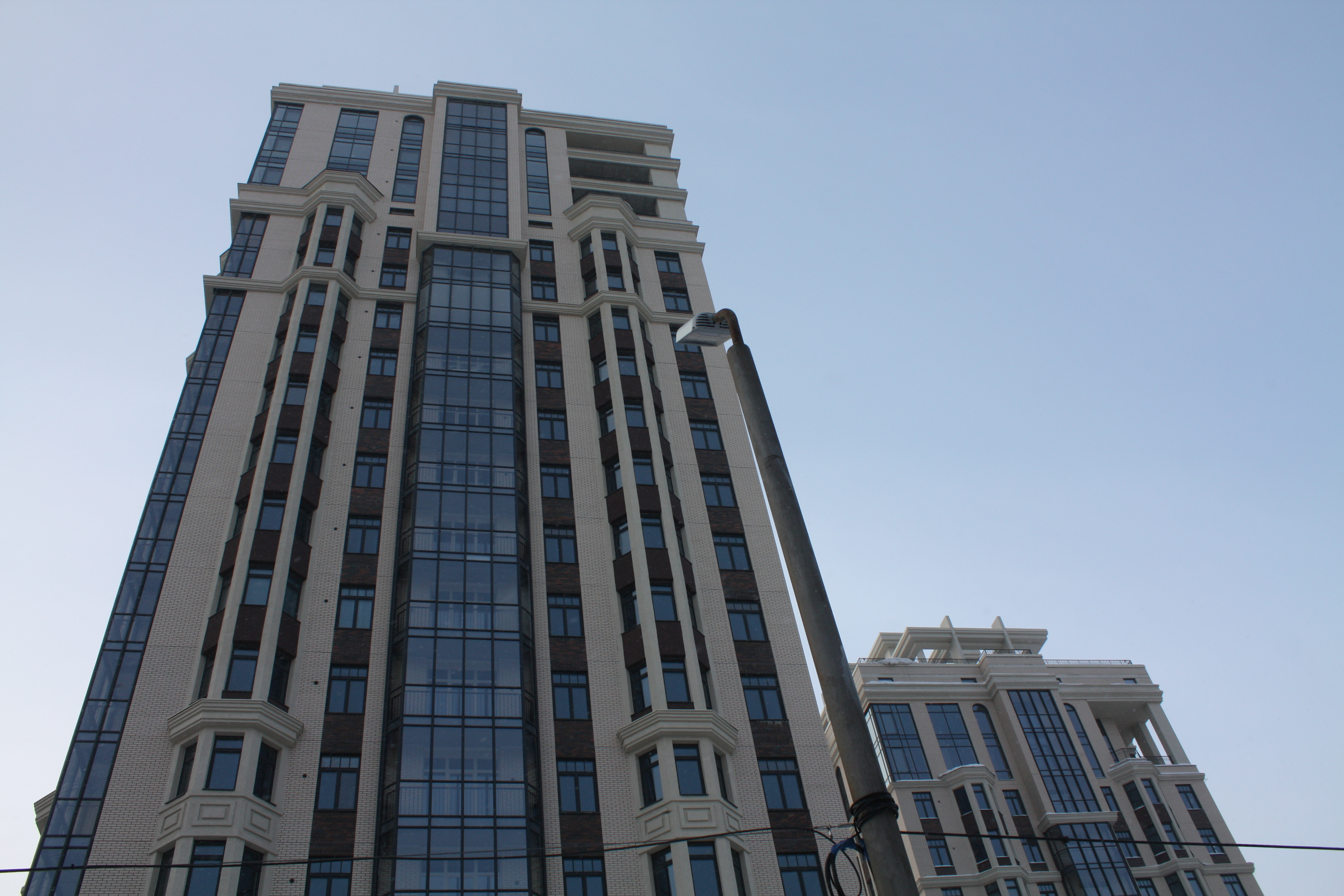
Montblanc Residence Housing Estate

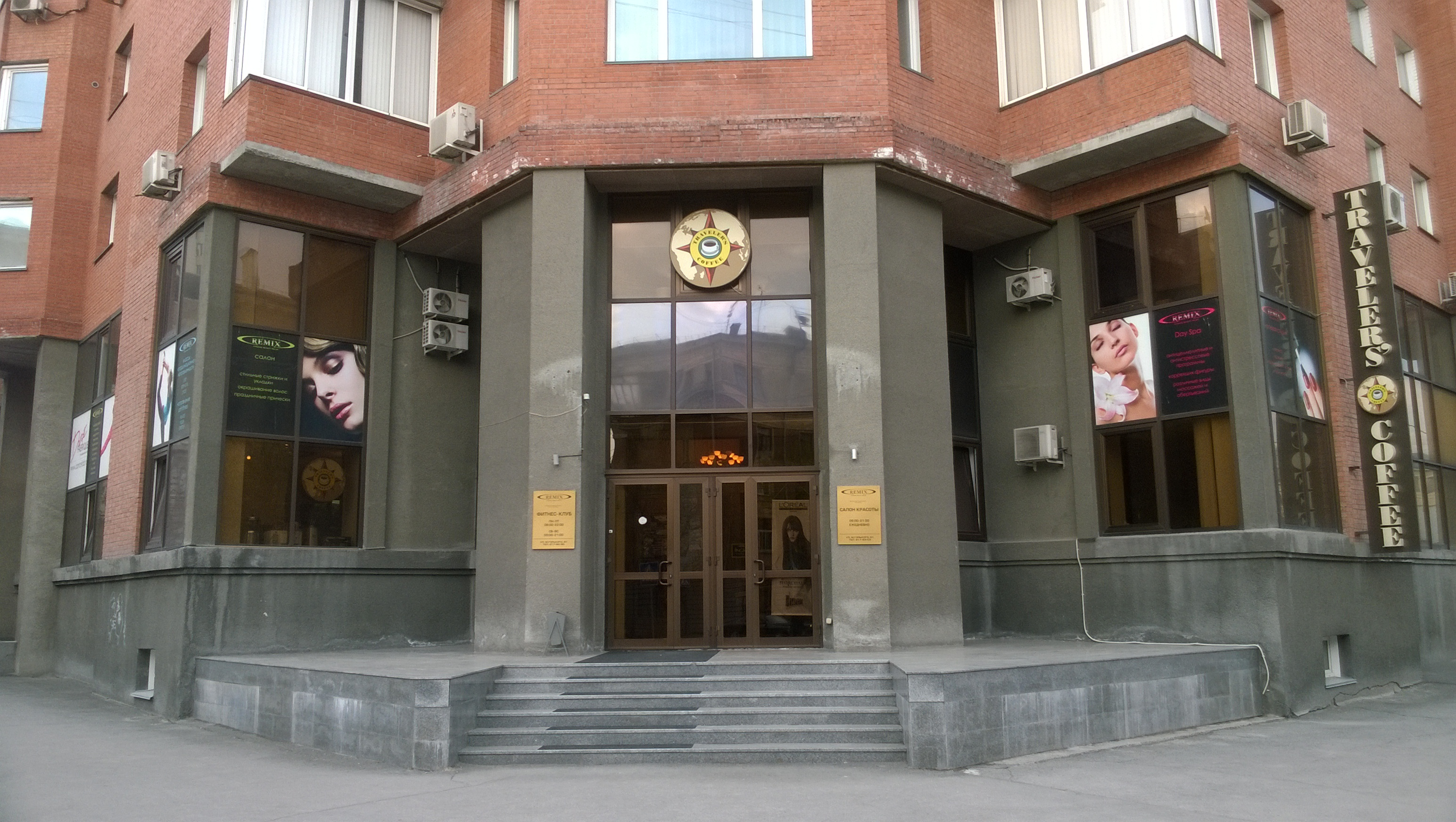

== Religious institutions ==
- Transfiguration Cathedral is a catholic cathedral built in 1997.

== Research institutions ==
- NIIIP
