= Zhernakova House =

House in Tsentralny, Novosibirsk, Russia

- Дом Жернаковой
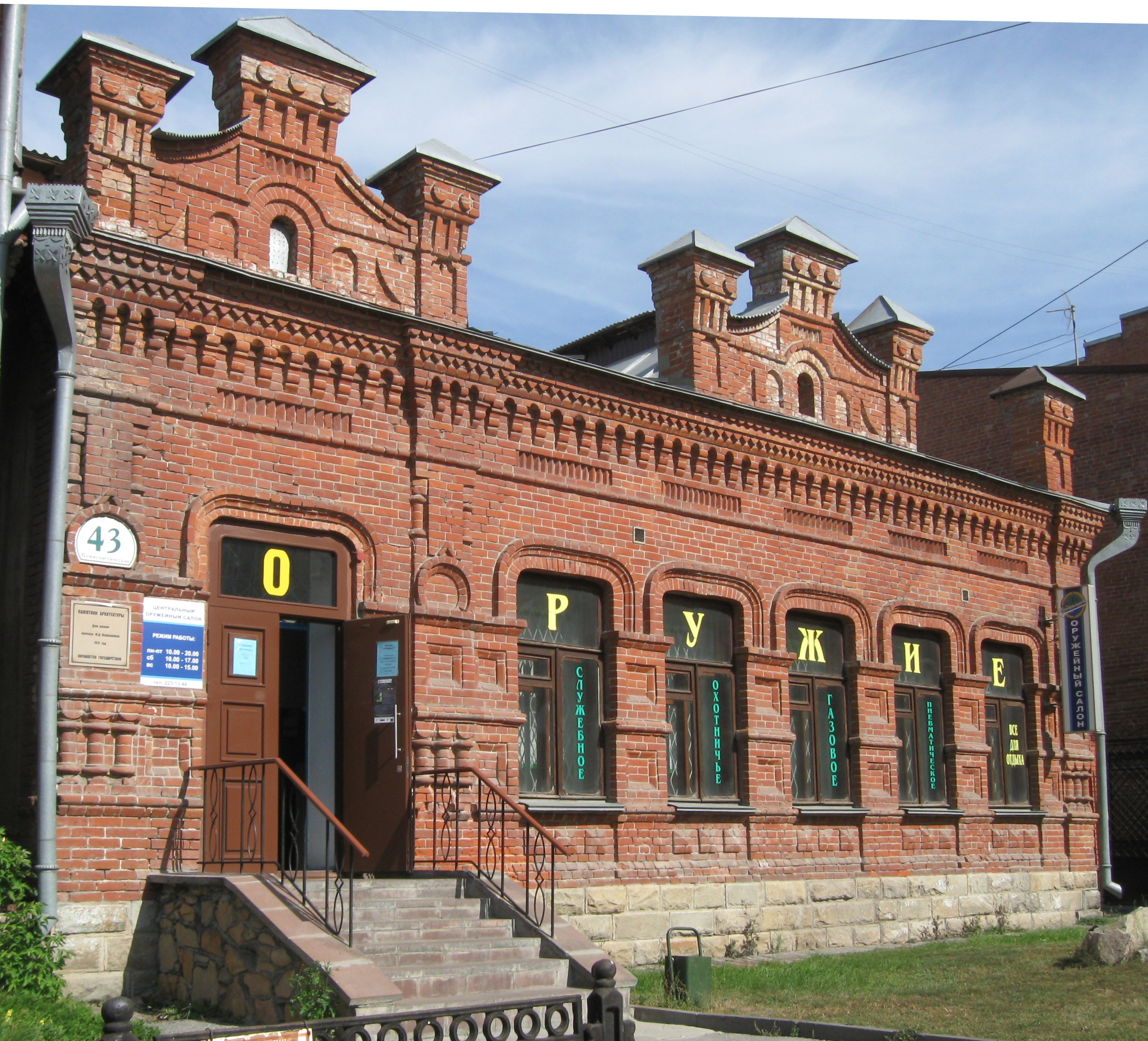
- Interactive map of the Zhernakova House area

General information
- Location: Kommunisticheskaya Street 43, Novosibirsk, Russia
- Coordinates: 55.0238°N 82.9234°E
- Completed: 1912

Zhernakova House (Russian: Дом Жернаковой) is a building in Tsentralny City District of Novosibirsk, Russia. It was constructed in 1912. The house is an architectural monument of regional significance.

== History ==
The house belonged to the tradeswoman Maria Danilovna Zhernakova, she owned several houses in Novonikolayevsk (current Novosibirsk), which she rented out.

== See also ==
- Ikonnikova House

== Bibliography ==
- Воеводина Т.В., Грес М. В., Минов И. Г. etc. (2011). Памятники истории, архитектуры и монументального искусства Новосибирской области (PDF). Новосибирск: ПК «ДЕАЛ». p. 77. ISBN 978-5-8402-0368-2.
