= Kryukov House =

Building

- Дом Крюкова
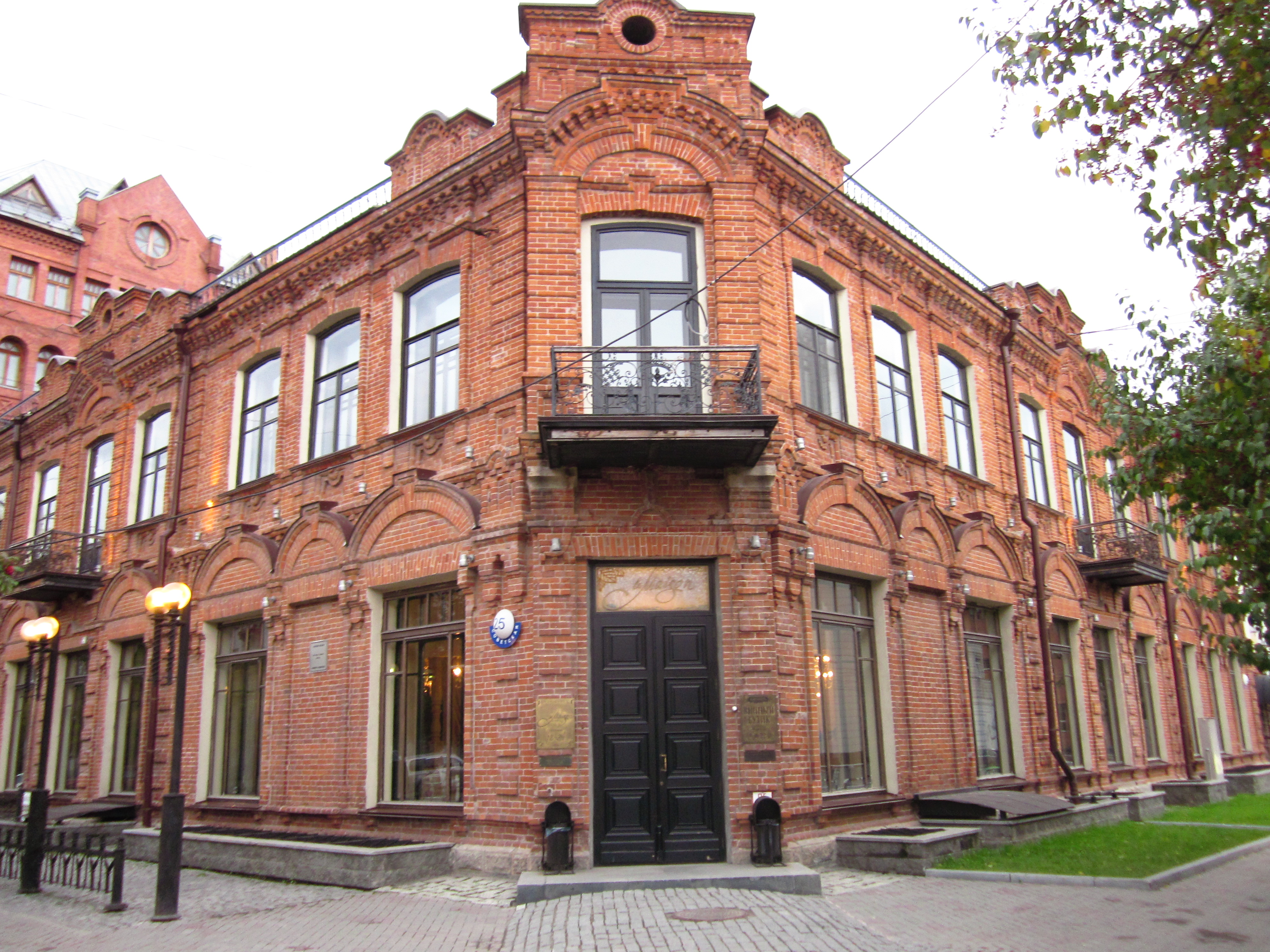
- Interactive map of the Kryukov House area

General information
- Location: Novosibirsk, Russia
- Coordinates: 55.0267°N 82.9169°E
- Completed: 1908

Kryukov House (Russian: Дом Крюкова) is a building in Zheleznodorozhny City District of Novosibirsk, Russia, built in 1908. It is located on the corner of Sovetskaya and Gorky streets. The house originally belonged to the merchant Zakhary Grigoryevich Kryukov.

== History ==
The house was built in Novonikolayevsk on Kabinetskaya (now Sovetskaya) Street in 1908.

The basement and first floor of the building remained at the disposal of Kryukov, the second floor was rented by Novonikolayevsk Public Meeting. Later, Novonikolayevsk Public Meeting also rented the first floor.

In 1910, Kryukov's wife, Yekaterina Ivanovna Kryukova, wrote a request to Novonikolayevsk City Government for the construction of an extension to the building along Tobizenovskaya Street (current Gorky Street).

In 1912, Novonikolayevsk Public Meeting was closed, and in 1913 Kryukov opened Diana Cinema (later renamed Luchshy Cinema) on the first floor, which worked until 1918; the second floor was occupied by a hotel.

From June 6, 1921 to November 1923, the second floor of the house was occupied by Siberian Bureau of the Central Committee of the RCP(b). The Marxist club, Agitation Theater named after Demyan Bedny and Khudozhestvenny Cinema were located on the ground floor.

Currently, the house is occupied by a wine shop and restaurant, visited by Vladimir Putin and Nursultan Nazarbayev in 2007.

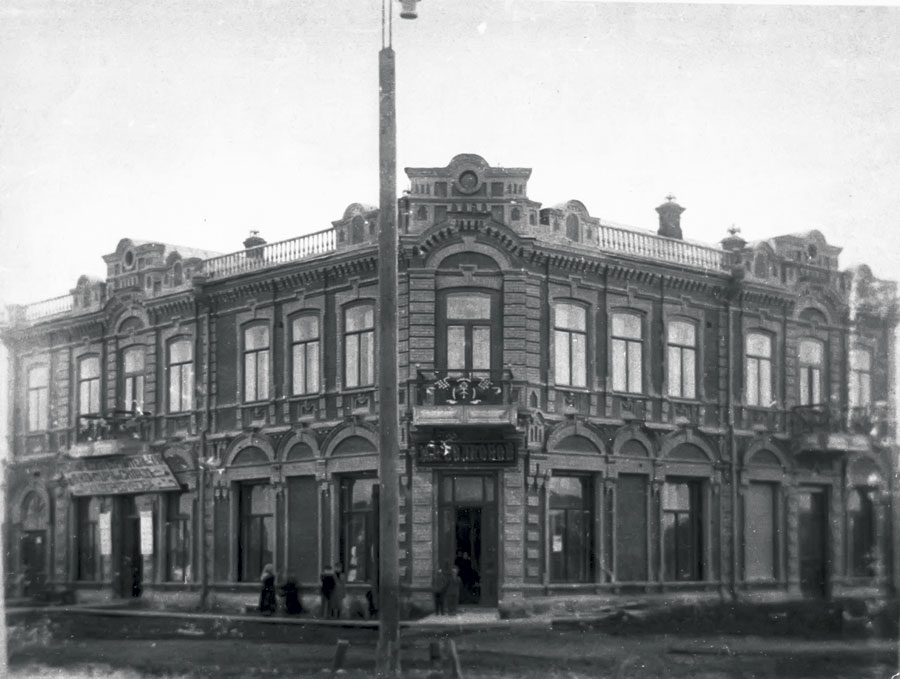
Kryukov House in tsarist period

== Gallery ==
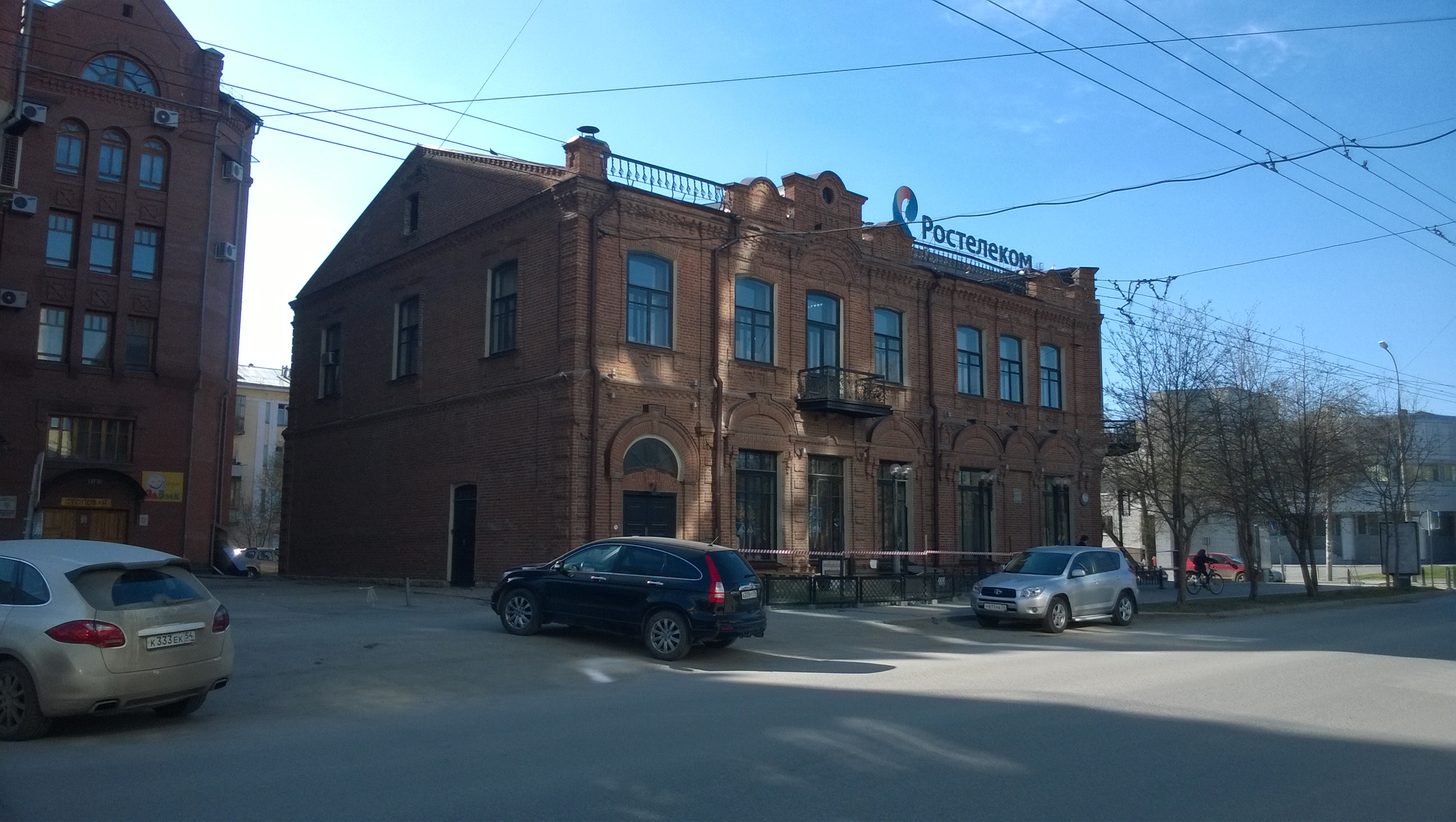

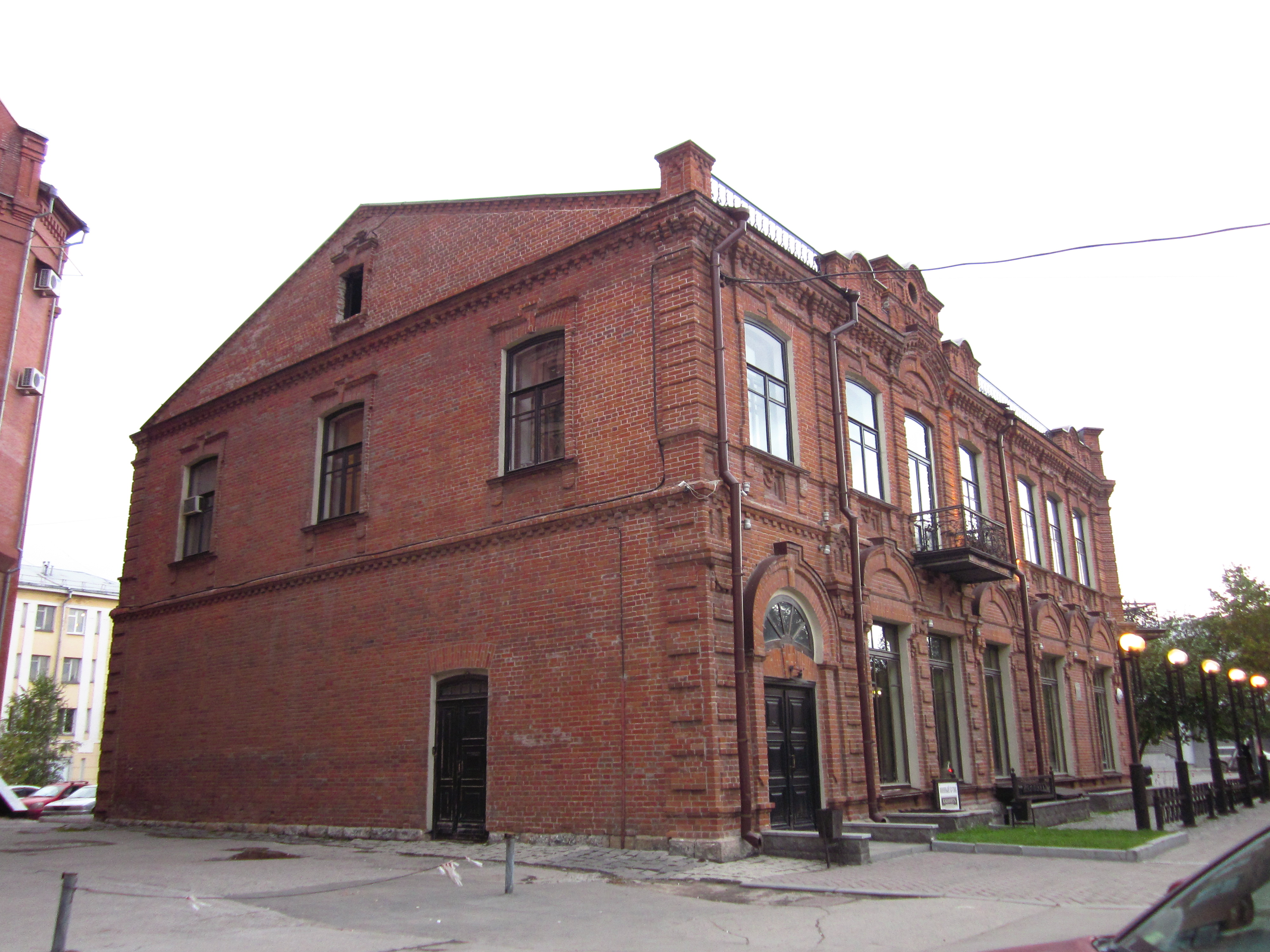

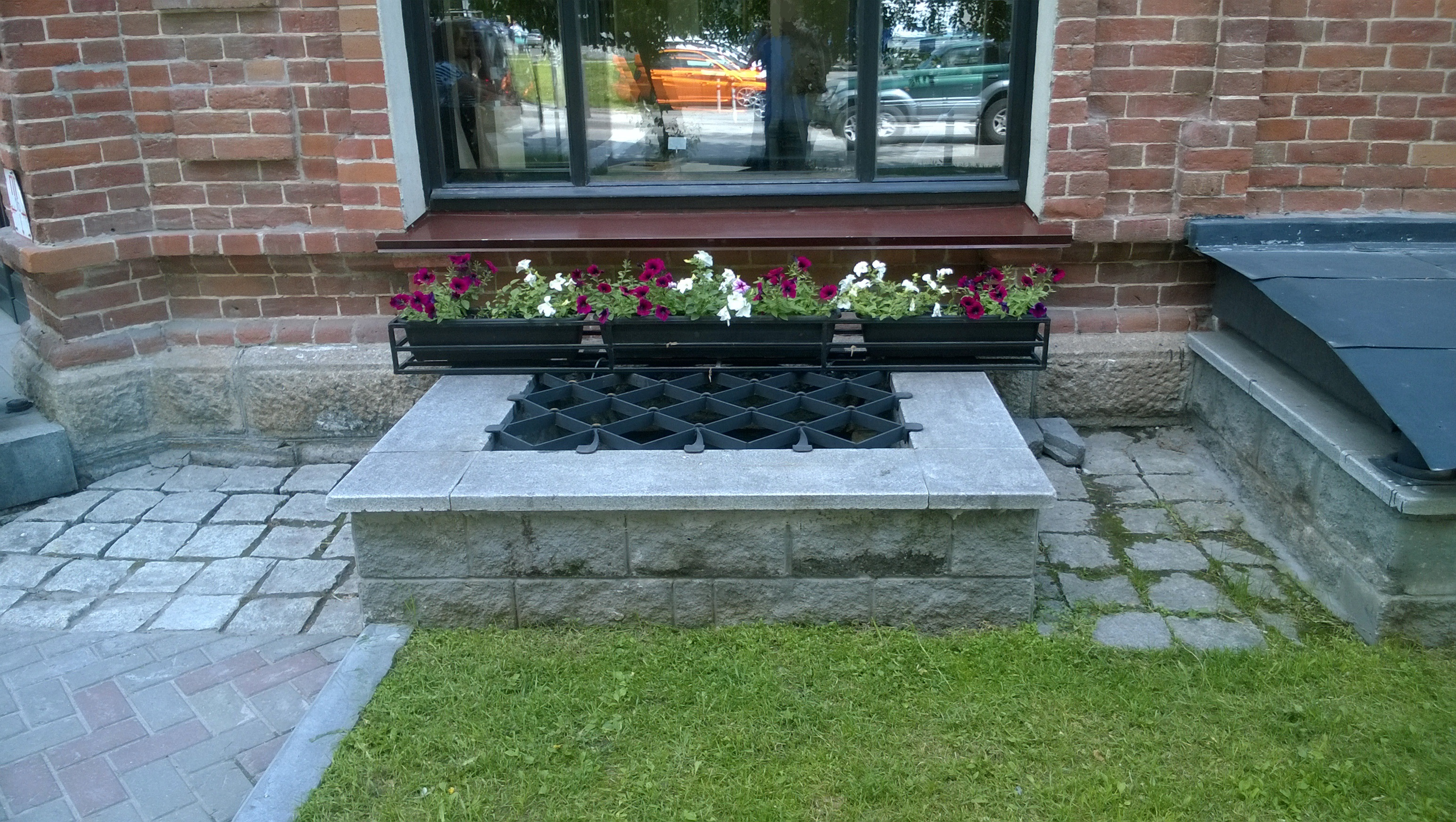

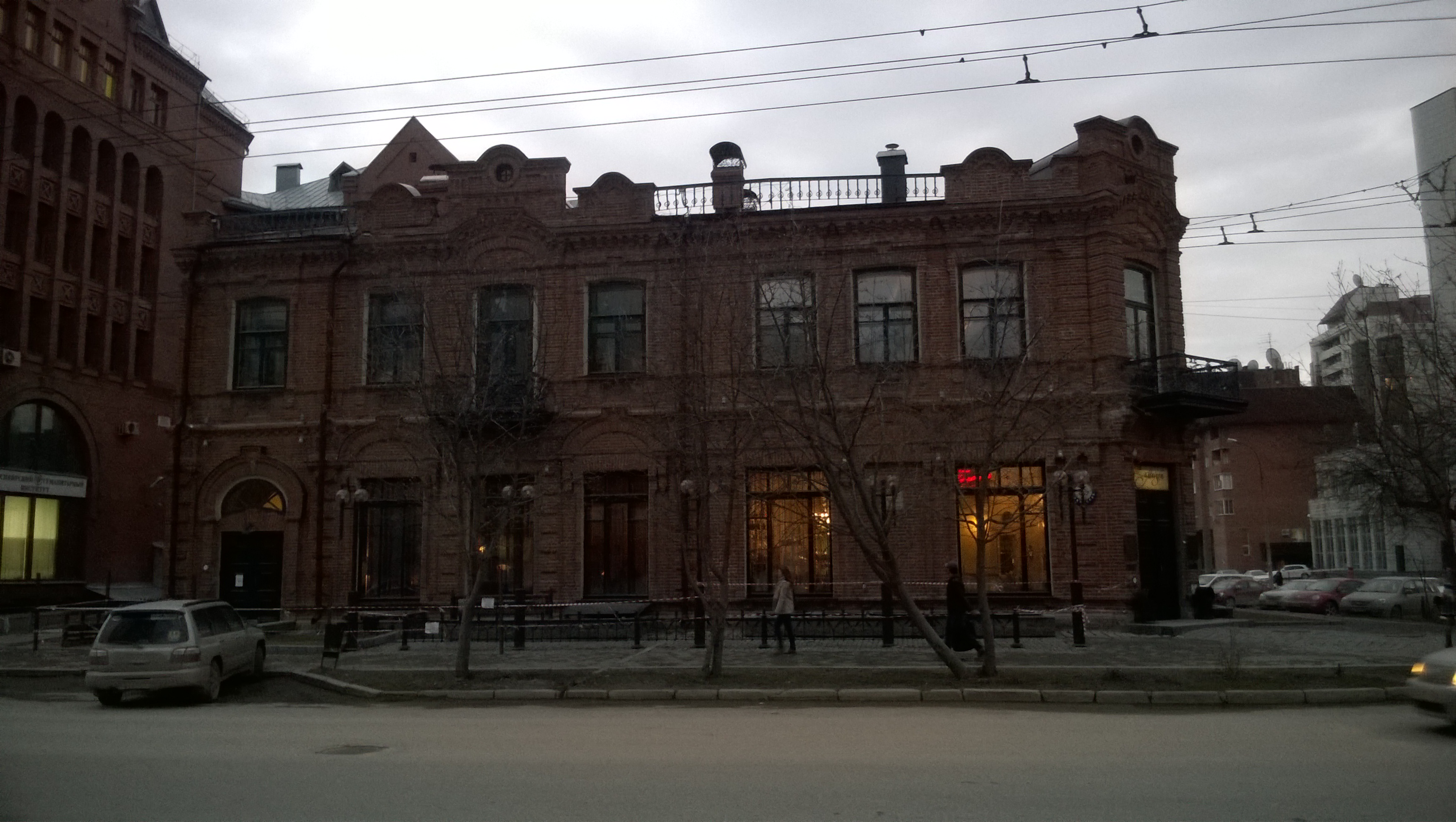

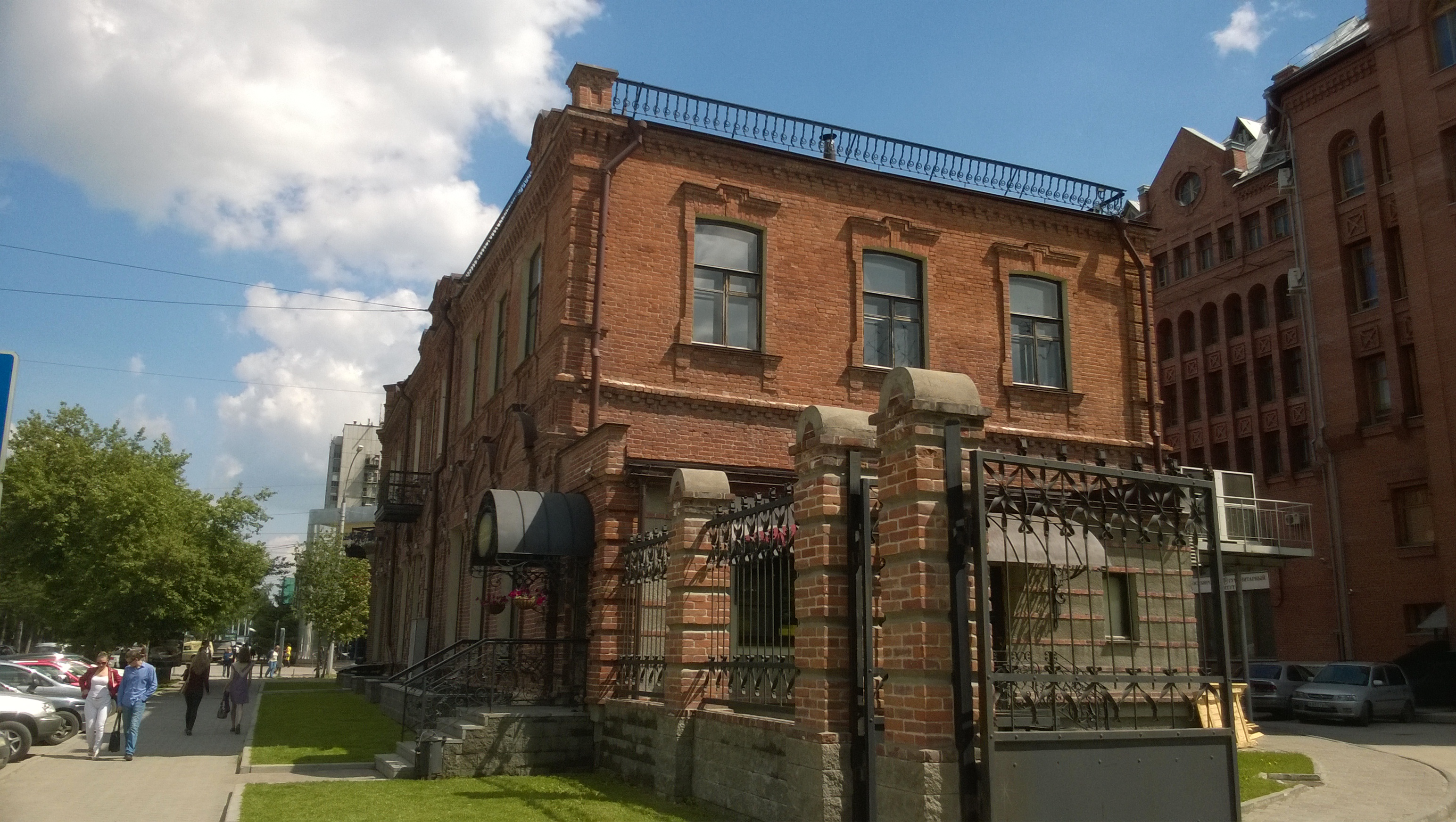

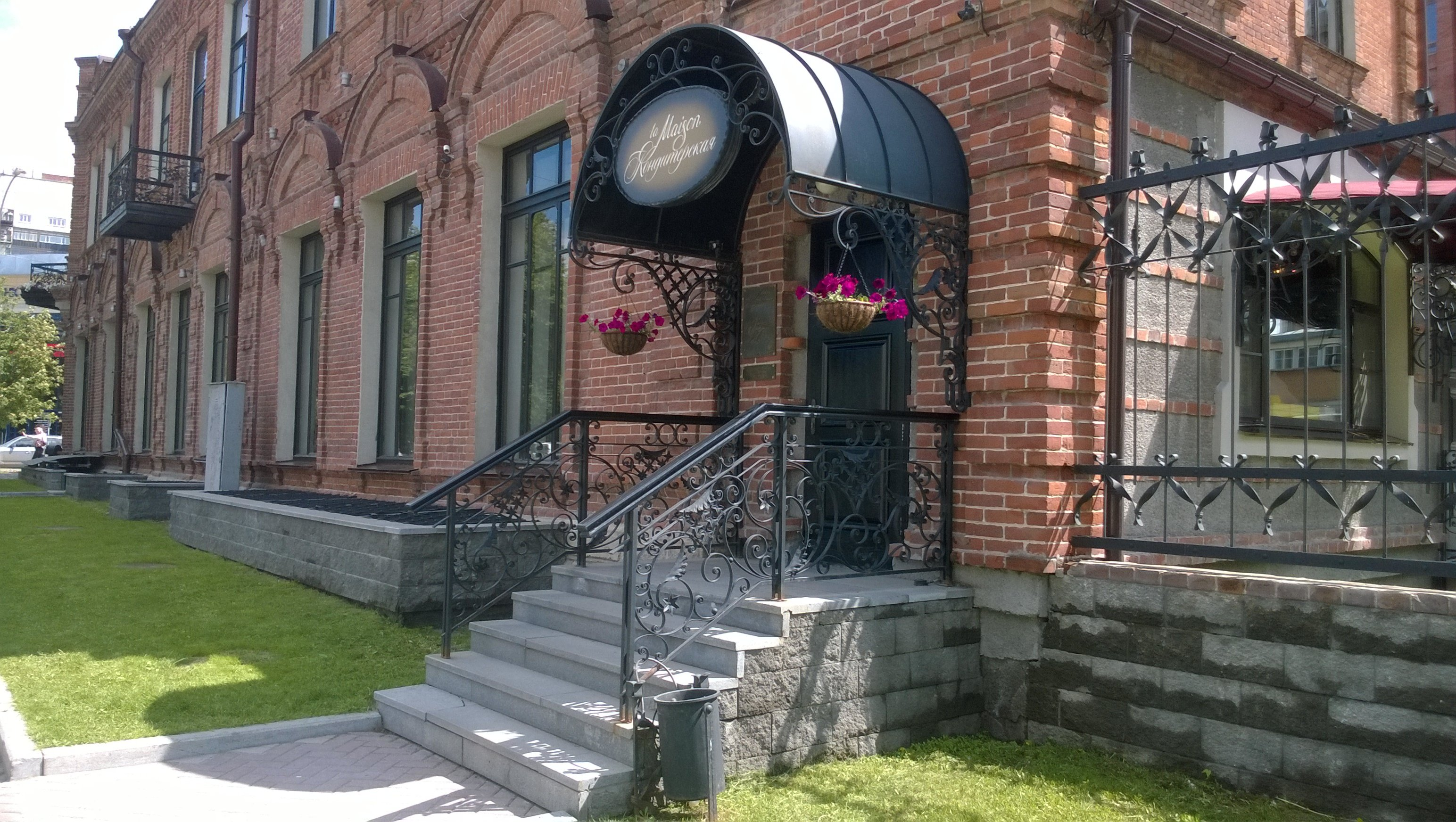

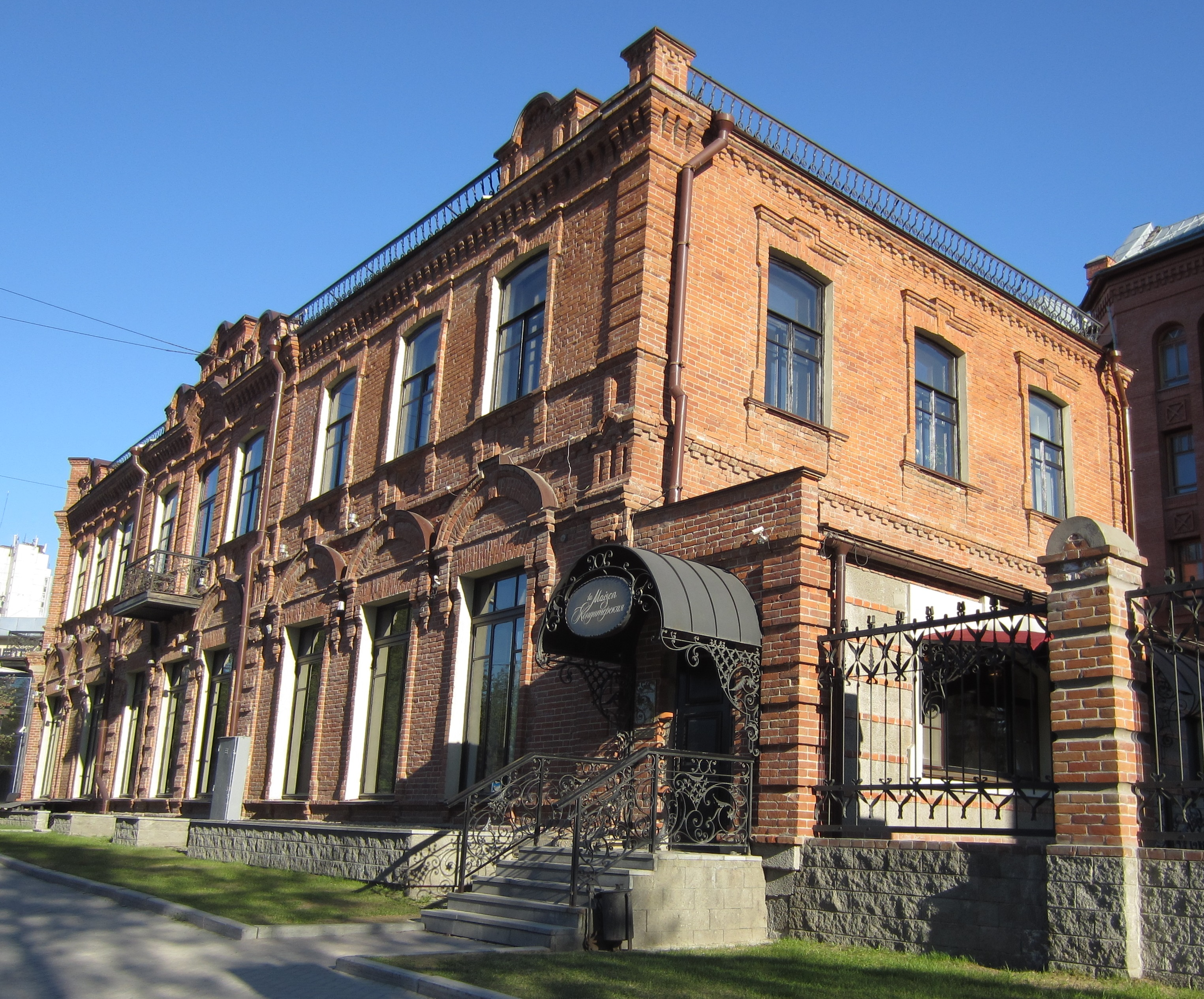

== See also ==
- Kopylov House
- Zedain House

== Bibliography ==
- Ламин В. А. (2003). Энциклопедия. Новосибирск. Новосибирск: Новосибирское книжное издательство. p. 274. ISBN 5-7620-0968-8.
