= Zedain House =

House in Tsentralny, Novosibirsk, Russia

- Дом Зедайна
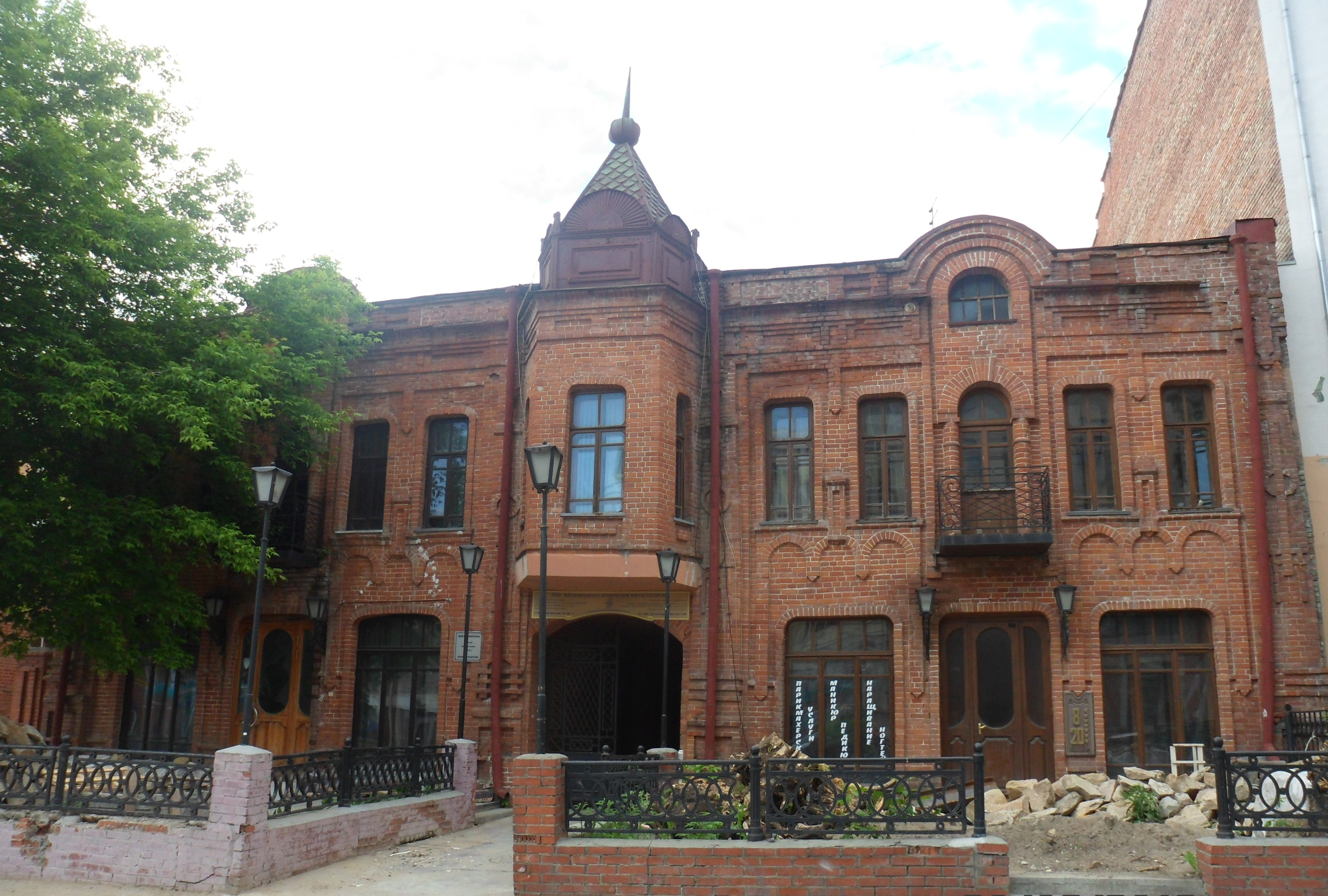
- Interactive map of the Zedain House area

General information
- Location: Kommunisticheskaya Street 45, Novosibirsk, Russia
- Coordinates: 55°N 82.9°E
- Completed: 1913

Zedain House (Russian: Дом Зедайна) is an Art Nouveau-style building in Tsentralny City District of Novosibirsk, Russia, built in 1913. It is located at Kommunisticheskaya Street.

== History ==
The house was built in 1912–1913 and belonged to the merchant P. M. Zedain.

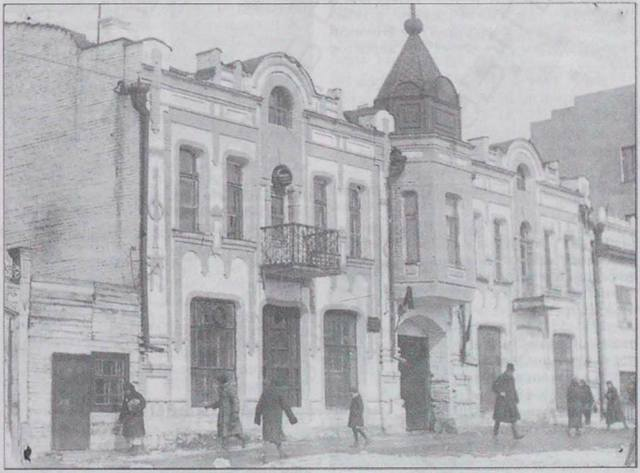
The house in 1930

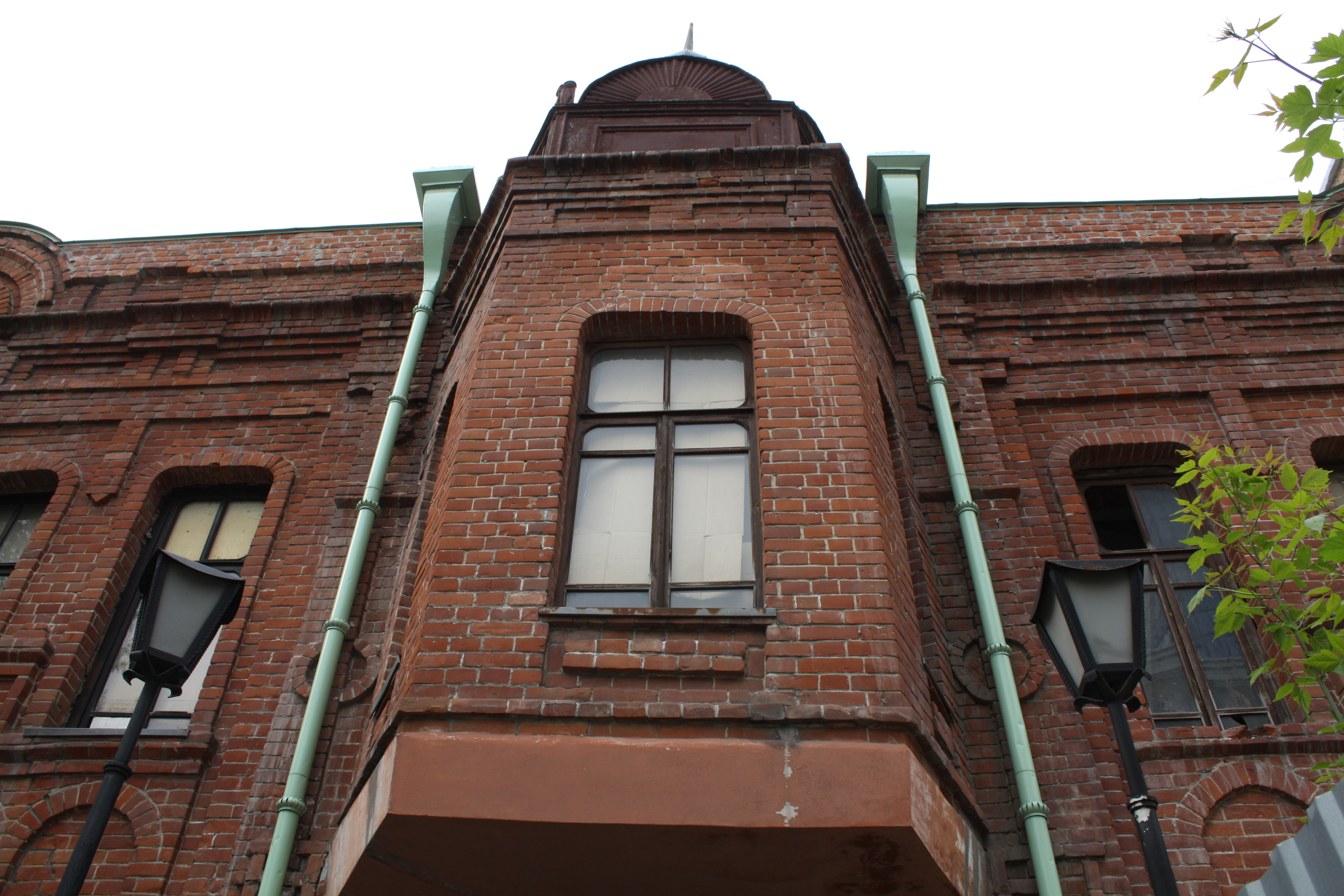

== See also ==
- Ikonnikova House
- Kryukov House
