= Sibirskaya station =

Novosibirsk Metro Station

Sibirskaya

General information
- Coordinates: 55.042222°N 82.920897°E
- System: Novosibirsk Metro
- Owner: Novosibirsk Metro
- Line: Dzerzhinskaya Line
- Platforms: Island platform
- Tracks: 2

Construction
- Structure type: Underground

History
- Opened: December 31, 1987

Services
| Preceding station | Novosibirsk Metro | Following station |
|---|---|---|
| Ploshchad Garina-Mikhaylovskogo Terminus | Dzerzhinskaya Line | Marshala Pokryshkina towards Zolotaya Niva |
| Gagarinskaya towards Zayeltsovskaya | Leninskaya Line transfer at Krasny Prospekt | Ploshchad Lenina towards Ploshchad Marksa |
Location

Sibirskaya (Russian: Сиби́рская) is a station on the Dzerzhinskaya Line of the Novosibirsk Metro in Novosibirsk, Siberia, Russia. It opened on December 31, 1987. This is a transfer station to Krasny Prospekt of the Leninskaya Line.
