= Sportivnaya =

Sportivnaya (Russian: Спорти́вная) is the name of several Russian metro stations:

- Sportivnaya (Kharkiv Metro)
- Sportivnaya (Moscow Metro)
- Sportivnaya (Novosibirsk Metro), a station of the Novosibirsk Metro
- Sportivnaya (Saint Petersburg Metro)
- Sportivnaya (Samara Metro)
- Sportivnaya (Ufa Metro), a proposed station of the Ufa Metro, Bashkortostan

== See also ==
- Spartywnaya (Minsk Metro)
