= Oktyabrskaya (Novosibirsk Metro) =

Novosibirsk Metro Station

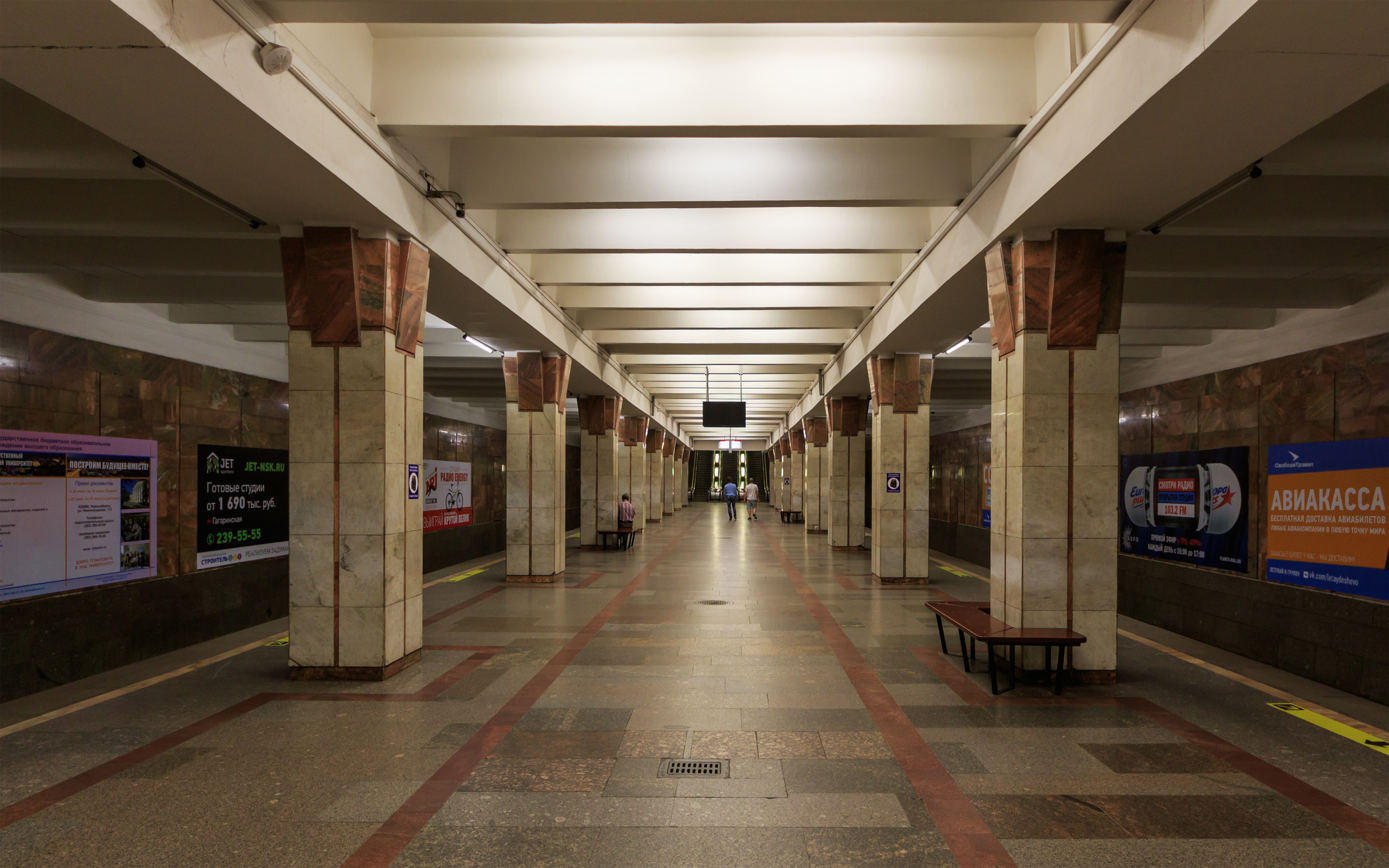

General information
- Coordinates: 55.018889°N 82.939167°E
- System: Novosibirsk Metro
- Owner: Novosibirsk Metro
- Line: Leninskaya Line
- Platforms: Island platform
- Tracks: 2

Construction
- Structure type: Underground

History
- Opened: December 28, 1985

Services
Preceding station	Novosibirsk Metro	Following station
Ploshchad Lenina towards Zayeltsovskaya	Leninskaya Line	Rechnoy Vokzal towards Ploshchad Marksa
Location

Oktyabrskaya (Russian: Октябрьская) is a station on the Leninskaya Line of the Novosibirsk Metro, serving Novosibirsk in Russia. It opened on December 28, 1985.
