= Ploshchad Lenina (Novosibirsk Metro) =

Novosibirsk Metro Station

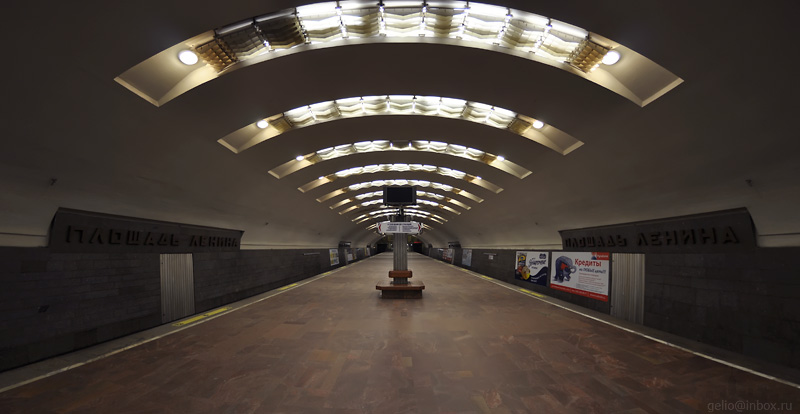
- Station Hall

General information
- Coordinates: 55.03°N 82.920556°E
- System: Novosibirsk Metro
- Owner: Novosibirsk Metro
- Line: Leninskaya Line
- Platforms: Island platform
- Tracks: 2

Construction
- Structure type: Underground

History
- Opened: December 28, 1985

Services
Preceding station	Novosibirsk Metro	Following station
Krasny Prospekt towards Zayeltsovskaya	Leninskaya Line	Oktyabrskaya towards Ploshchad Marksa
Location

Ploshchad Lenina (Russian: Пло́щадь Ле́нина (Square of the Lenin) ) is a station on the Leninskaya Line of the Novosibirsk Metro. It opened on December 28, 1985.
