= Novosibirsk Metro Bridge =

Bridge in Novosibirsk, Russia

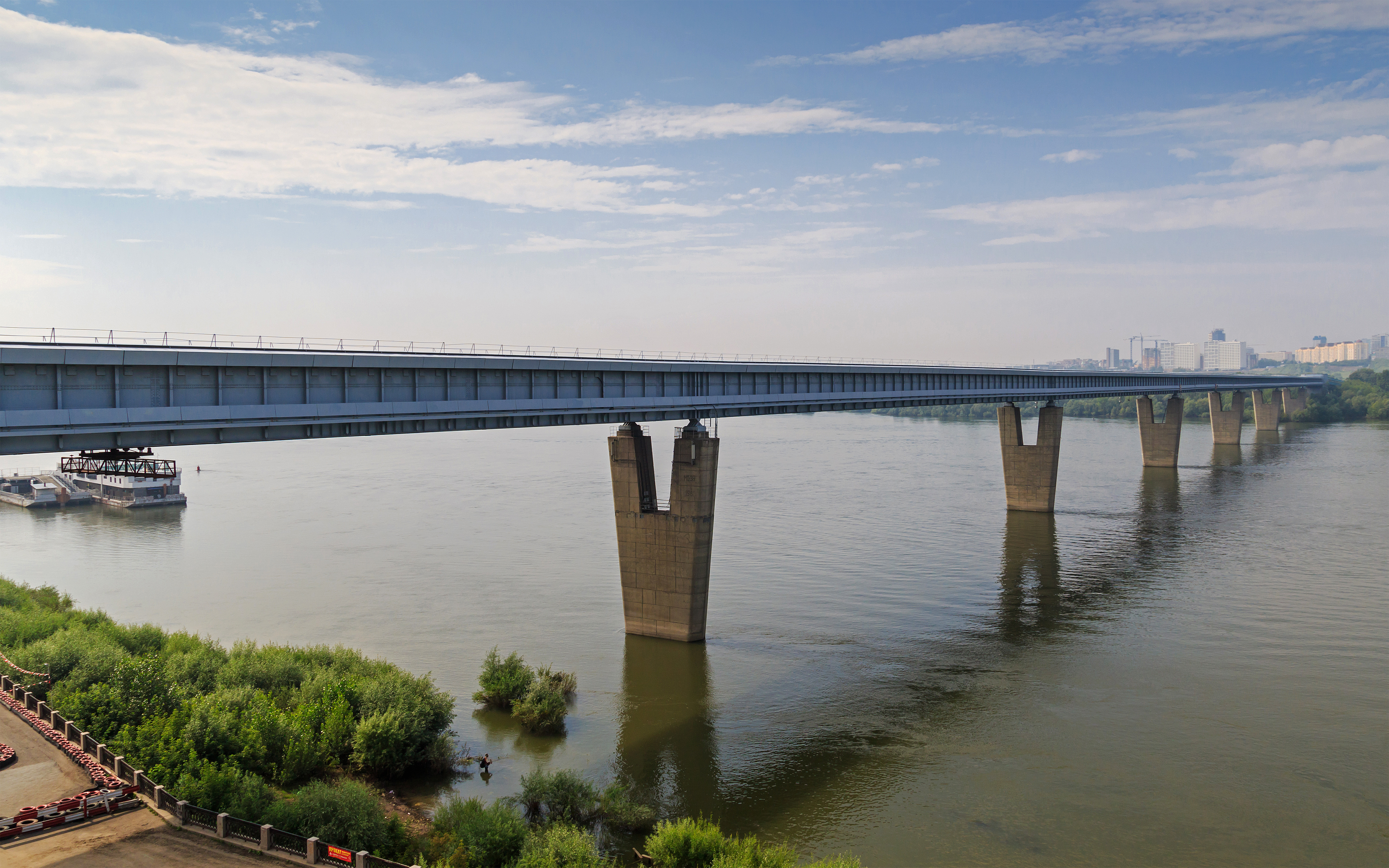
- Coordinates: 55°00′15″N 82°55′54″E
- Crosses: Ob River
- Locale: Novosibirsk

Characteristics
- Total length: 2145 m

History
- Opened: January 7, 1986; 40 years ago

Location
- Interactive map of Novosibirsk Metro Bridge

Novosibirsk Metro Bridge (Russian: Новосибирский метромост, romanized: Novosibirskiy metromost) is a metro bridge over the Ob River in Novosibirsk, Russia. It connects the stations Sportivnaya and Rechnoy Vokzal of the Leninskaya Line of the Novosibirsk Metro. It is the longest-covered metro bridge in the world.

== History ==
Novosibirsk Metro Bridge was opened on 7 January 1986.
