= Krasny Prospekt station =

Novosibirsk Metro Station

Krasny Prospekt

General information
- Coordinates: 55.041111°N 82.9175°E
- System: Novosibirsk Metro
- Owner: Novosibirsk Metro
- Line: Leninskaya Line
- Platforms: Island platform
- Tracks: 2

Construction
- Structure type: three-span column
- Depth: 8 metres (26 ft)

History
- Opened: January 7, 1986

Services
Preceding station	Novosibirsk Metro	Following station
Gagarinskaya towards Zayeltsovskaya	Leninskaya Line	Ploshchad Lenina towards Ploshchad Marksa
Ploshchad Garina-Mikhaylovskogo Terminus	Dzerzhinskaya Line transfer at Sibirskaya	Marshala Pokryshkina towards Zolotaya Niva
Location

Krasny Prospekt (Russian: Кра́сный проспе́кт, "Red Avenue") is a station on the Leninskaya Line (Lenin Line) of the Novosibirsk Metro that serves Novosibirsk, in Siberia, Russia. It opened on January 7, 1986. This is a transfer station to Sibirskaya of the Dzerzhinskaya Line. The station is located under eponymous avenue (until 1920, it was known as the Nikolaevsky Prospekt (Russian: Никола́евский проспект) or Nicholas' Avenue) between its intersections with Gogol Street and Krylov Street.

Krasny Prospekt has two lobbies. Two exits of the southern lobby (on Krylov Street) are built in the residential buildings. The northern lobby provides transfer to Sibirskaya. Notable locations nearby include the Novosibirsk Central Market, city circus and Ascension Cathedral.
