= Gagarinskaya (Novosibirsk Metro) =

Novosibirsk Metro Station

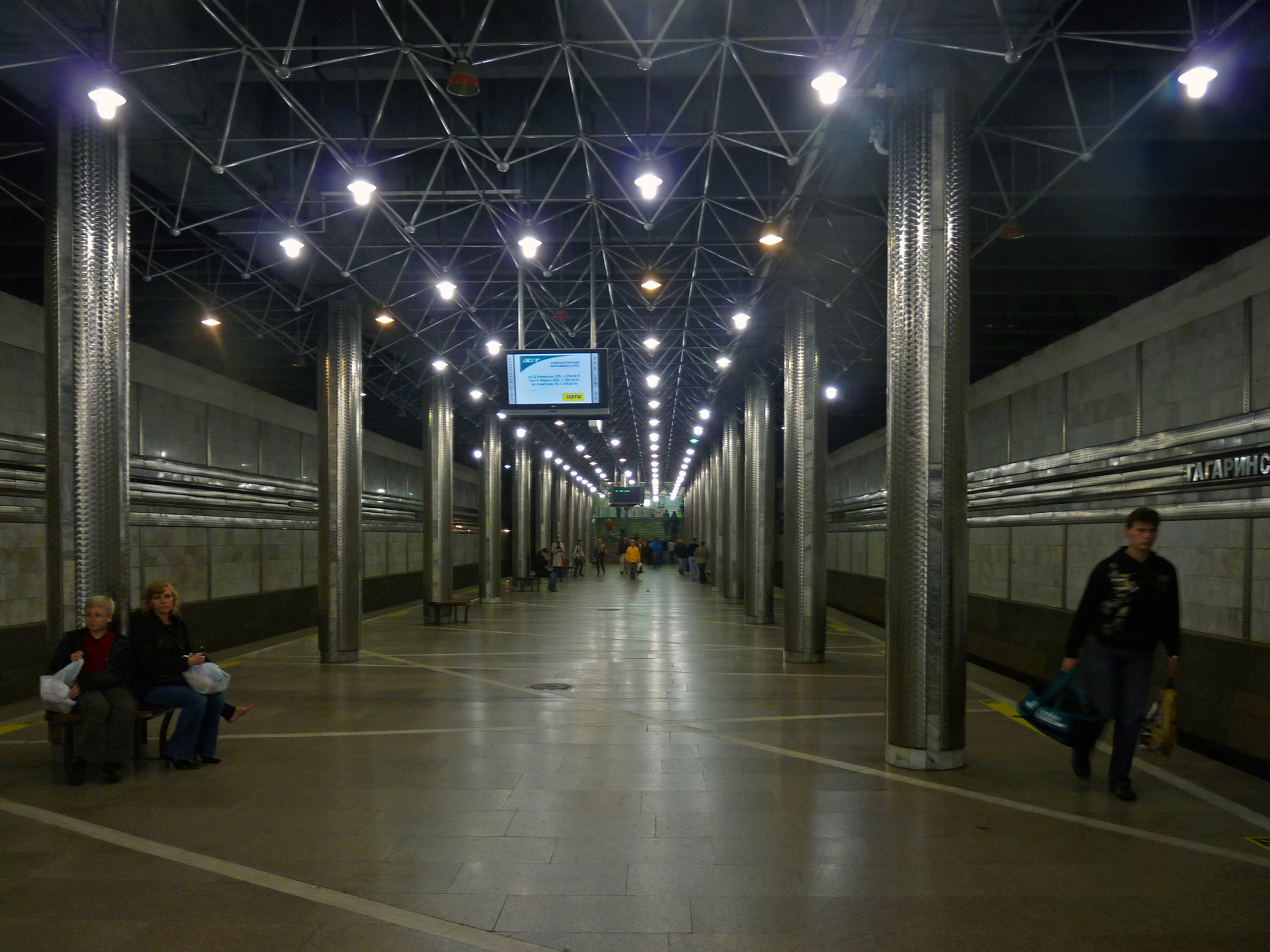
- Station Hall

General information
- Coordinates: 55.050556°N 82.914722°E
- System: Novosibirsk Metro
- Owner: Novosibirsk Metro
- Line: Leninskaya Line
- Platforms: Island platform
- Tracks: 2

Construction
- Structure type: Underground

History
- Opened: 2 April 1992

Services
Preceding station	Novosibirsk Metro	Following station
Zayeltsovskaya Terminus	Leninskaya Line	Krasny Prospekt towards Ploshchad Marksa
Location

Gagarinskaya (Russian: Гага́ринская (Gagarin)) is a station on the Leninskaya Line of the Novosibirsk Metro, in Novosibirsk, Russia. It opened on 2 April 1992.
