= Nikolai Fomin =

Nikolai Fomin may refer to:

- Nikolai Fomin (actor) (1912–1983), Russian stage actor
- Nikolai Fomin (engineer) (born 1937), Soviet-Ukrainian engineer
