= Studencheskaya =

Studencheskaya may refer to:

- Studencheskaya (Moscow Metro)
- Studencheskaya (Kharkiv Metro)
- Studencheskaya (Novosibirsk Metro)
- Mount Studencheskaya, Bureya Range, Jewish Autonomous Oblast
