= Stary Dom (Novosibirsk) =

- Старый дом
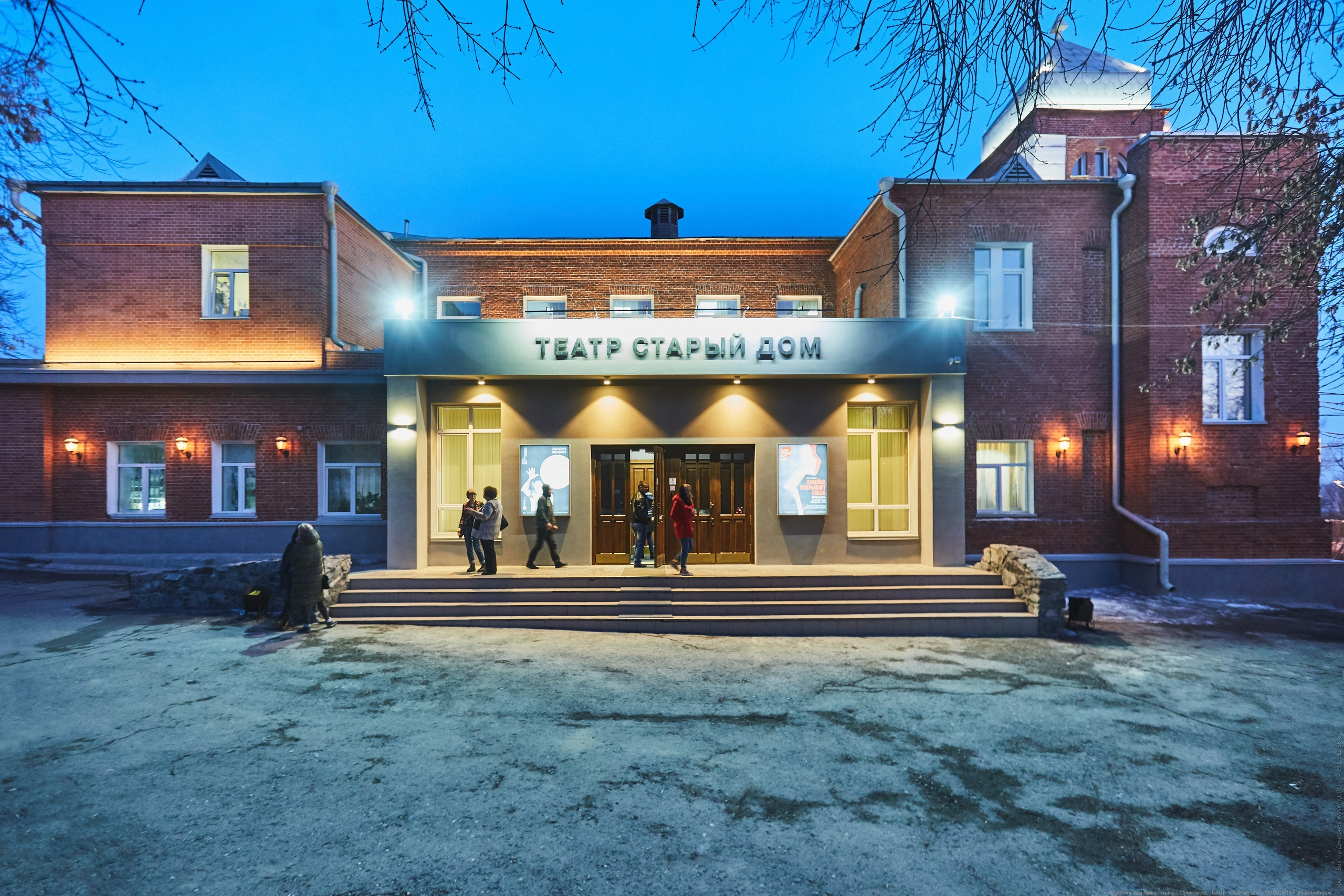
- Interactive map of Stary Dom
- Address: Bolshevistskaya Street 45, Novosibirsk, Russia
- Coordinates: 55°00′27″N 82°56′21″E
- Public transit: Rechnoy Vokzal

Website
- old-house.ru

Stary Dom (Russian: Старый дом) is a drama theatre in Oktyabrsky District of Novosibirsk, Russia. It was founded in 1933.

== History ==
The theatre was established on October 1, 1933, and was originally called the Mobile Kolkhoz and Sovkhoz Theatre. The purpose of its creation was the development of art in the countryside. On September 28, 1933, the Sovetskaya Sibir wrote that the theatre had been established as a branch of the Red Torch Theatre to serve the agricultural areas of West Siberian Krai. According to the newspaper, the staff of the branch included employees of the Red Torch under the leadership of Rudin, Honored Artist of the Republic. It also reported that on October 1 the troupe starting work on the play Breakthrough in Love (Прорыв в любви) and 20 October the theatre is going to travel around the raions.

In 1934–1937, the mobile theatre was already staging plays by notable Soviet authors: The Wonderful Alloy by V. Kirshon, The Six Darlings by A. Arbuzov, Platon Krechet by A. Korneychuk, The Glory by V. Gusev, it also staged performances based on the works of M. Gorky, A. Ostrovsky, K. Goldoni. The play Property by I. Personov, staged by Rudin, was recognized as the best at the competition of the USSR Council of People's Commissars.

In 1939, the theatre became the winner at the Krai Theatre Review for its success in the social and political activities of the village.

On April 4, 1942, the theatre was renamed the Oblast Kolkhoz and Sovkhoz Theatre, on November 10, 1943, it became the Oblast Drama Theatre.

During the Great Patriotic War, it staged Late Love by A. Ostrovsky, Russian People etc. At that time, more than 300 000 kolkhozniks became spectators of the theatre. From October 23, 1944, to April 11, 1945, a troupe of 11 people performed at the front for the military of the Red Army.

In 1967, the theatre opened in the building constructed in 1912 by Andrey Kryachkov. It was transferred to the theatre thanks to the efforts of the chief director S. S. Ioanidi (1963–1974) and the director of the theatre A. M. Makhmutov.

In 1982 and 1984, the team was awarded the pennant of the USSR Ministry of Culture.

In 1983, in celebration of its fiftieth anniversary, the theatre was awarded the Order of the Badge of Honor for its services to the development of Soviet theatrical art.

== Performances ==
In 2002, the theatre presented Jazz Story in N City (staged by I. Serebrovskaya), a performance with jazz music on the dramatic stage, which became a sensation of season.

Among the children's performances The Voobrazilia Country, The Birthday of Leopold the Cat, The Tale of Tsar Saltan, The Domovyonok Nafanya and His Friends and others are popular.
