= Nikolai Smolin =

Russian painter

Nikolai Fyodorovich Smolin (1888–1962) was a Russian and Soviet portrait painter.

== Biography ==
The artist was born in 1888 in Platonovka, Perm Governorate. His father worked the goldfields, his mother came from a working-class family and was a housewife.

While studying at the Chelyabinsk City School, he began to paint.

In 1900, he moved to Tomsk with his family, where he entered a craft school. In the same city, he entered the art studio of Augusta Stepanovna Kapustina-Popova.

In 1935 artist moved to Novosibirsk, where he first lived on Kirov Street, later he lived on Bolshevistskaya Street near the Trud Plant. Workers of this enterprise become characters in his paintings.

He died in Novosibirsk in 1962.

== Some works ==
- Portrait of a Wife against a Background of Greenery (1912);
- Self-portrait (1916);
- Portrait of the artist Bortnich (1916);
- Portrait of V. S. Nemetz (1932);
- Portrait of the architect A. D. Kryachkov (1943);
- Portrait of Elizaveta Styuart (1944);
- Portrait of electrician rationalizer N. A. Bezrodny (1956–1957), in 2011, A. O. Kuprisova, the granddaughter of N. A. Bezrodny, presented a portrait of her grandfather to the Novosibirsk State Art Museum;
- Self-portrait (1958);
- Portrait of A. S. Nikulin (1961).
