= Studencheskaya (Novosibirsk Metro) =

Novosibirsk Metro Station

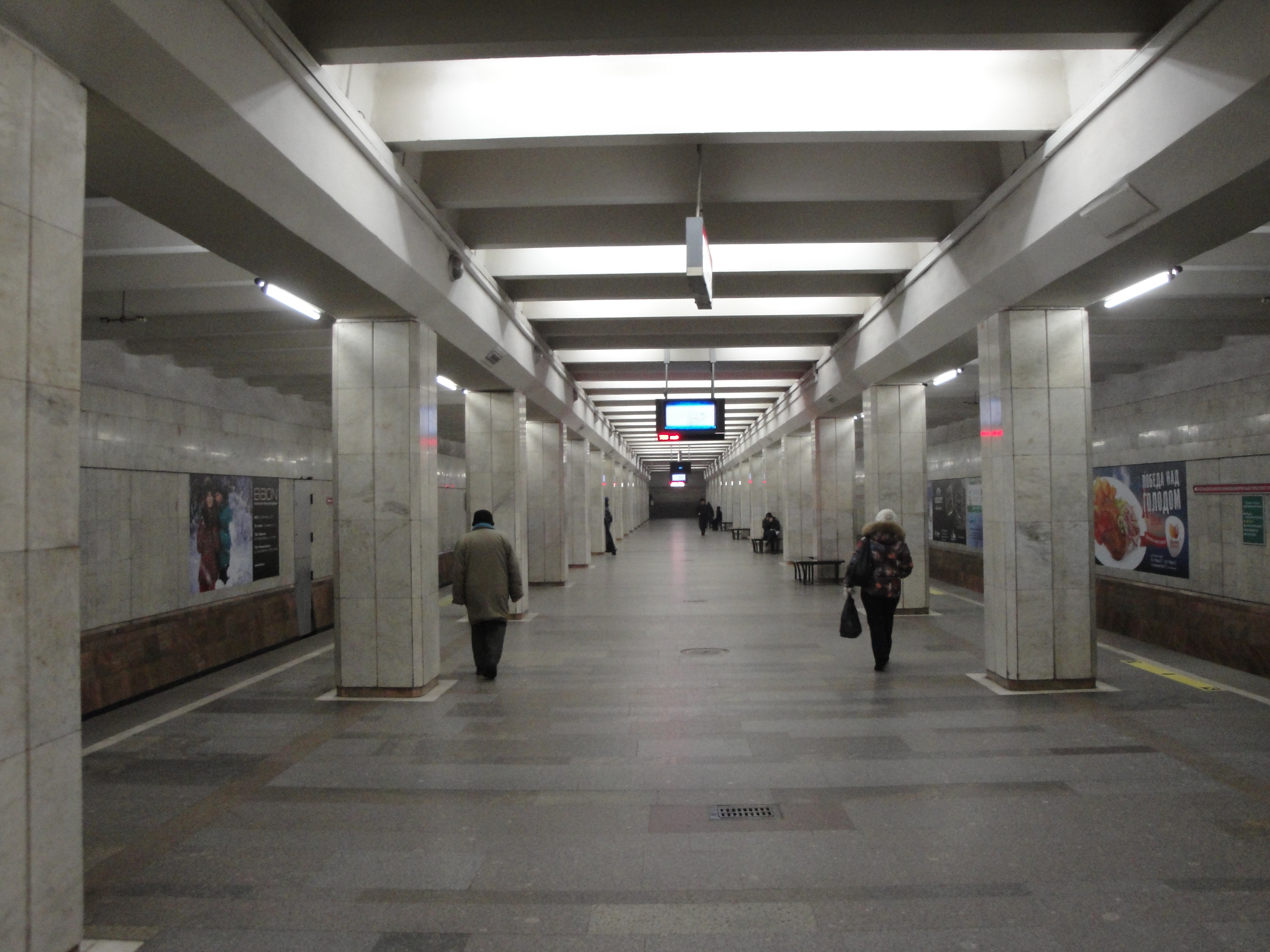

General information
- Coordinates: 54.988889°N 82.90625°E
- System: Novosibirsk Metro
- Owner: Novosibirsk Metro
- Line: Leninskaya Line
- Platforms: Island platform
- Tracks: 2

Construction
- Structure type: Underground

History
- Opened: December 28, 1985

Services
| Preceding station | Novosibirsk Metro | Following station |
|---|---|---|
| Sportivnaya towards Zayeltsovskaya | Leninskaya Line | Ploshchad Marksa Terminus |
Location

Studencheskaya (Russian: Студенческая (Station of Students) ) is a station on the Leninskaya Line of the Novosibirsk Metro that serves Novosibirsk, in Russia. It opened on December 28, 1985.
