= Nikolai Fomin (actor) =

Nikolai Dmitrievich Fomin (1912–1983) was a stage actor of the Novosibirsk Oblast Drama Theatre (future the Stary Dom), Honored Artist of the RSFSR (1956).

== Biography ==
The actor was born on 22 October 1912. He began his career with Anisim Rogachevsky in the theatre studio at the club named after Petukhov (1932–1938).

In 1938–1974, Fomin worked as an actor in the Novosibirsk Kolkhoz and Sovkhoz Mobile Theatre/Novosibirsk Oblast Drama Theatre (modern Stary Dom).

From 1941 to 1945, he participated in the Great Patriotic War.

He died in Novosibirsk on 18 August 1983 and was buried at the Kleshchikhinskoye Cemetery.

== Roles ==
The actor performed in more than 150 roles: Cléante (The Imaginary Invalid by Molière, 1940), Kharitonov (The Old Man by Maxim Gorky, 1952), John Falstaff (The Merry Wives of Windsor by William Shakespeare, 1957), Lynyayev (Wolves and Sheep by Alexander Ostrovsky, 1960), President (Intrigue and Love by Friedrich Schiller, 1964), Pyotr (The Power of Darkness by Leo Tolstoy, 1974) etc.
