= Rechnoy Vokzal (Novosibirsk Metro) =

Novosibirsk Metro Station

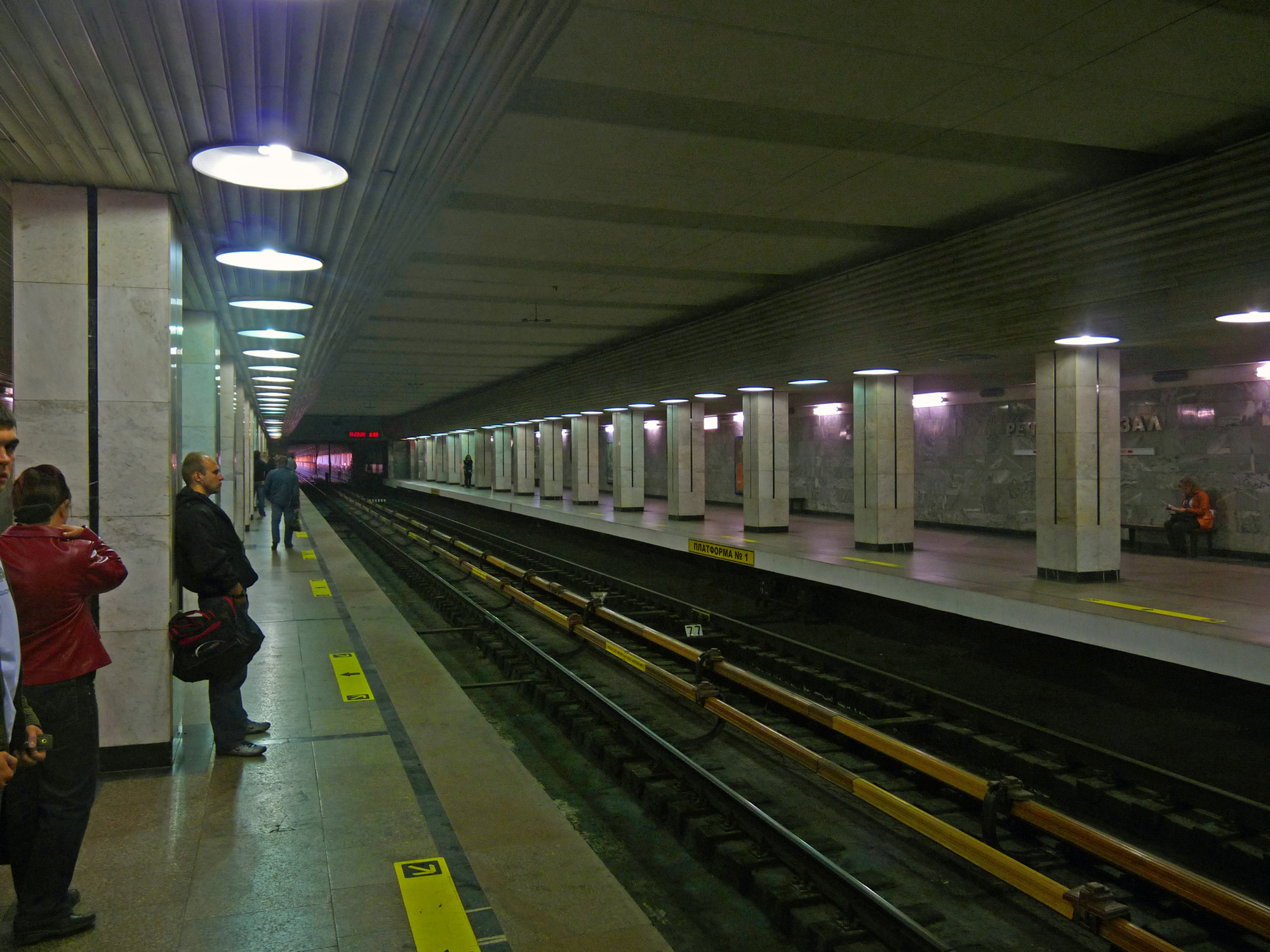
- Platforms at Rechnoy Vokzal station

General information
- Coordinates: 55.009333°N 82.940194°E
- System: Novosibirsk Metro
- Owner: Novosibirsk Metro
- Line: Leninskaya Line
- Platforms: Side platforms
- Tracks: 2

Construction
- Structure type: Underground
- Depth: 0
- Platform levels: 1
- Cycle facilities: Yes

History
- Opened: 7 January 1986
- Electrified: 825 V DC by third rail

Services
Preceding station	Novosibirsk Metro	Following station
Oktyabrskaya towards Zayeltsovskaya	Leninskaya Line	Sportivnaya towards Ploshchad Marksa
Location

Rechnoy Vokzal (Russian: Речно́й вокза́л (literally - River Passenger Station) is a station on the Leninskaya Line (Lenin Line) of the Novosibirsk Metro. It opened on 7 January 1986.
