= Kuntsawshchyna (Minsk Metro) =

Minsk Metro station

Kuntsawshchyna Кунцаўшчына
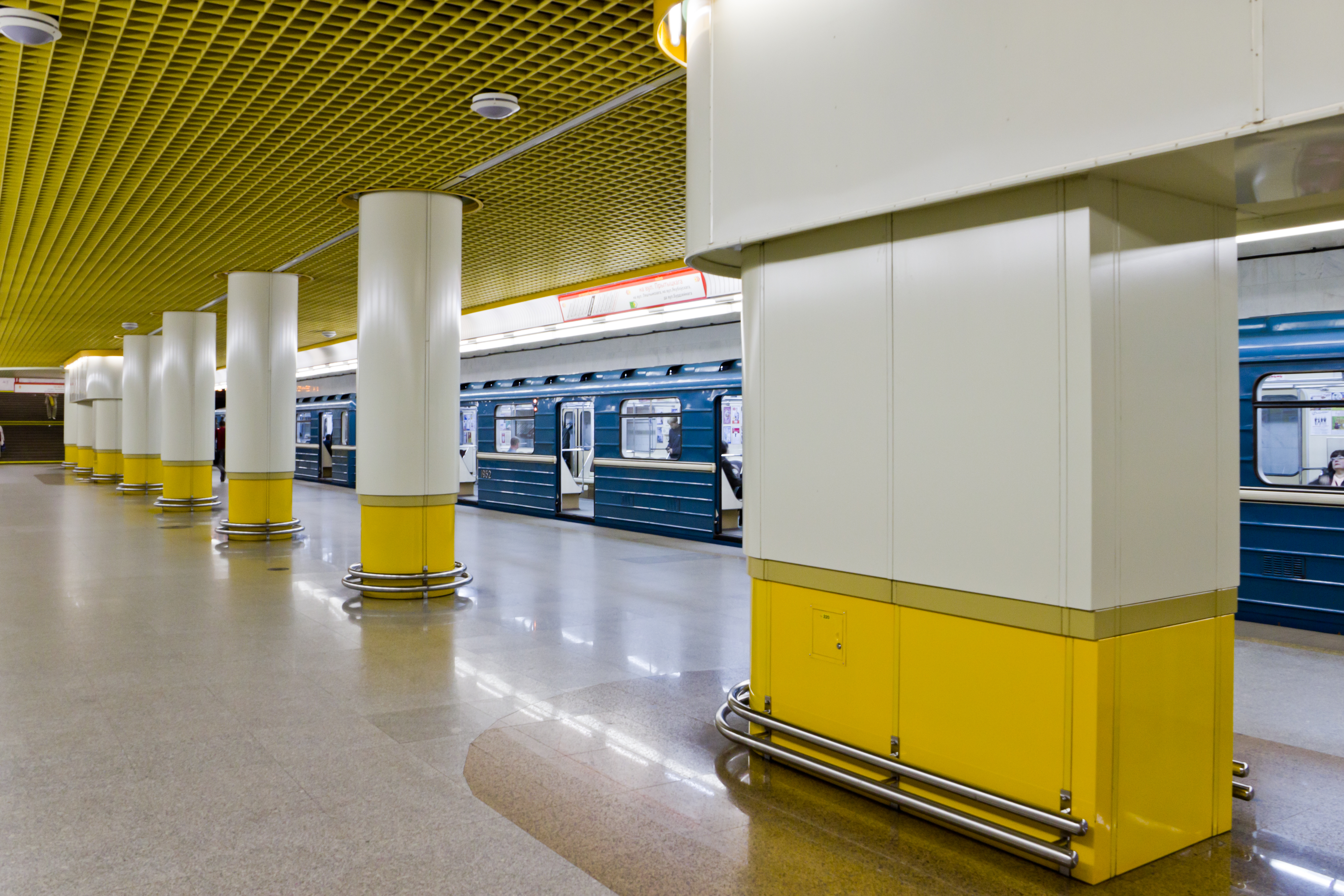
- Station Hall

General information
- Coordinates: 53°54′23″N 27°27′20″E
- System: Minsk Metro
- Owner: Minsk Metro
- Line: Awtazavodskaya line
- Platforms: 1 Island platform
- Tracks: 2

Construction
- Structure type: Underground

Other information
- Station code: 222

History
- Opened: 7 November 2005; 20 years ago

Services
Preceding station	Minsk Metro	Following station
Kamyennaya Horka Terminus	Awtazavodskaya line	Spartywnaya towards Mahilyowskaya
Location
- Location within Belarus

Kuntsawshchyna (Belarusian: Кунцаўшчына; Russian: Кунцевщина) is a Minsk Metro station. It was opened on 7 November 2005.
