= Sportivnaya (Novosibirsk Metro) =

Novosibirsk Metro station

Sportivnaya Спортивная
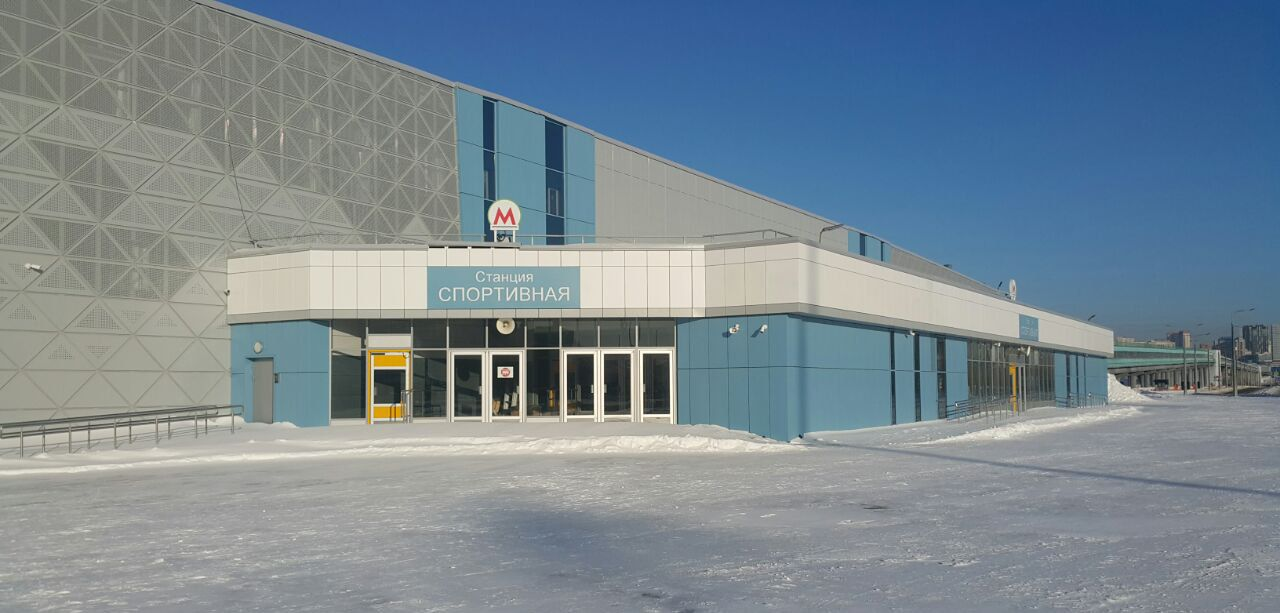
- Sportívnaya station

General information
- Location: Kirovsky District; Novosibirsk; Russia
- Coordinates: 54.9970°N 82.9205°E
- System: Novosibirsk Metro
- Line: Leninskaya Line

History
- Opened: September 5, 2025

Services
Preceding station	Novosibirsk Metro	Following station
Rechnoy Vokzal towards Zayeltsovskaya	Leninskaya Line	Studencheskaya towards Ploshchad Marksa
Location

Sportivnaya (Russian: Спортивная) is a station on the Leninskaya Line of the Novosibirsk Metro, in the city's Kirovsky District. The station is located between the stations Rechnoy Vokzal and Studencheskaya. It opened on September 5, 2025.

== Background ==
The station had been part of the original plans of the Novosibirsk Metro, and although construction had begun at the time, it was not completed. The remains of the earlier attempt were later torn down.

The station's opening has been delayed multiple times. The station was reportedly 92 percent complete by the middle of 2022. As of 2023, city officials hope to have the station open by the end of the year. However, this did not pass until September 2025
