= Bolshevistskaya Street, Novosibirsk =

Street in Novosibirsk, Russia

Bolshevistskaya Street
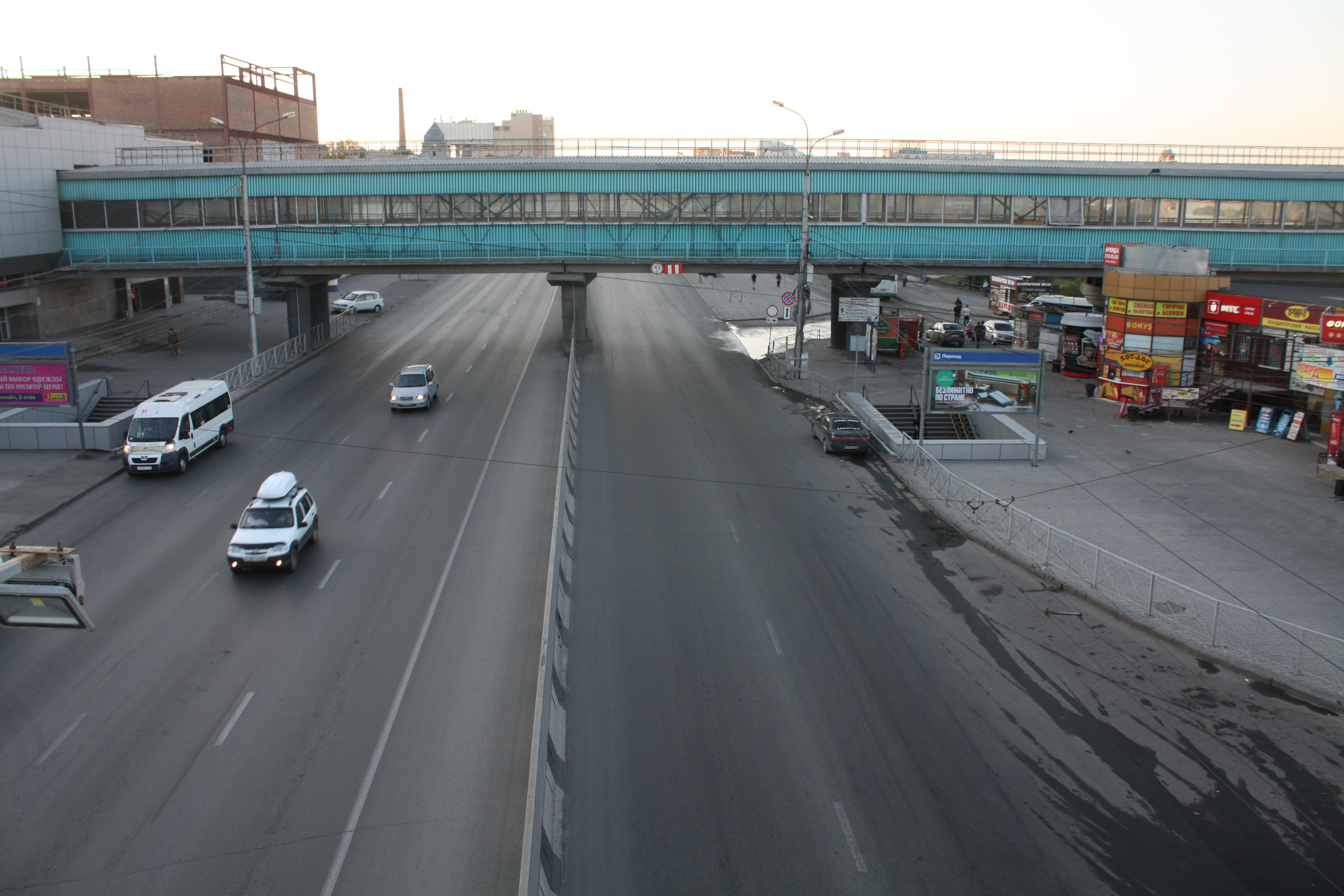
- Interactive map of Bolshevistskaya Street
- Native name: Большевистская улица (Russian)
- Location: Novosibirsk; Russia
- Nearest metro station: Rechnoy Vokzal

Bolshevistskaya Street (Russian: Большевистская улица) is a street in Oktyabrsky City District of Novosibirsk, Russia. It starts from the road junction called Engineer Budagov Square, runs southeast along the right bank of the Ob River and ends near the bridge over the Inya River. The length of the street is more than 7 km.

Bolshevistskaya Street is one of the most important traffic arteries of the city, besides it is part of the Federal Highway R256.

== History ==
The street was originally called Traktovaya Street, it was part of the road to Berdsk, Barnaul and Biysk.

== Gallery ==
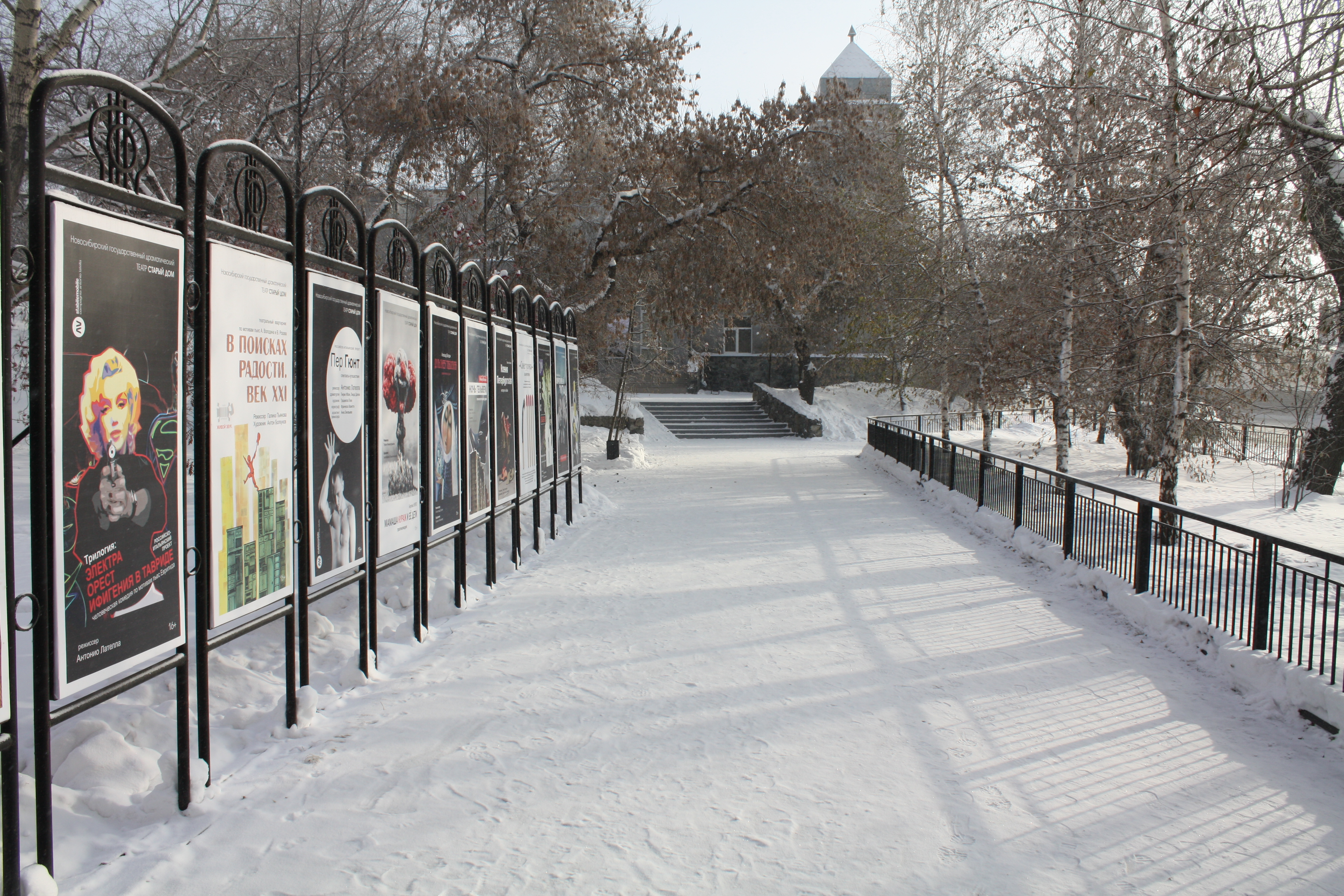

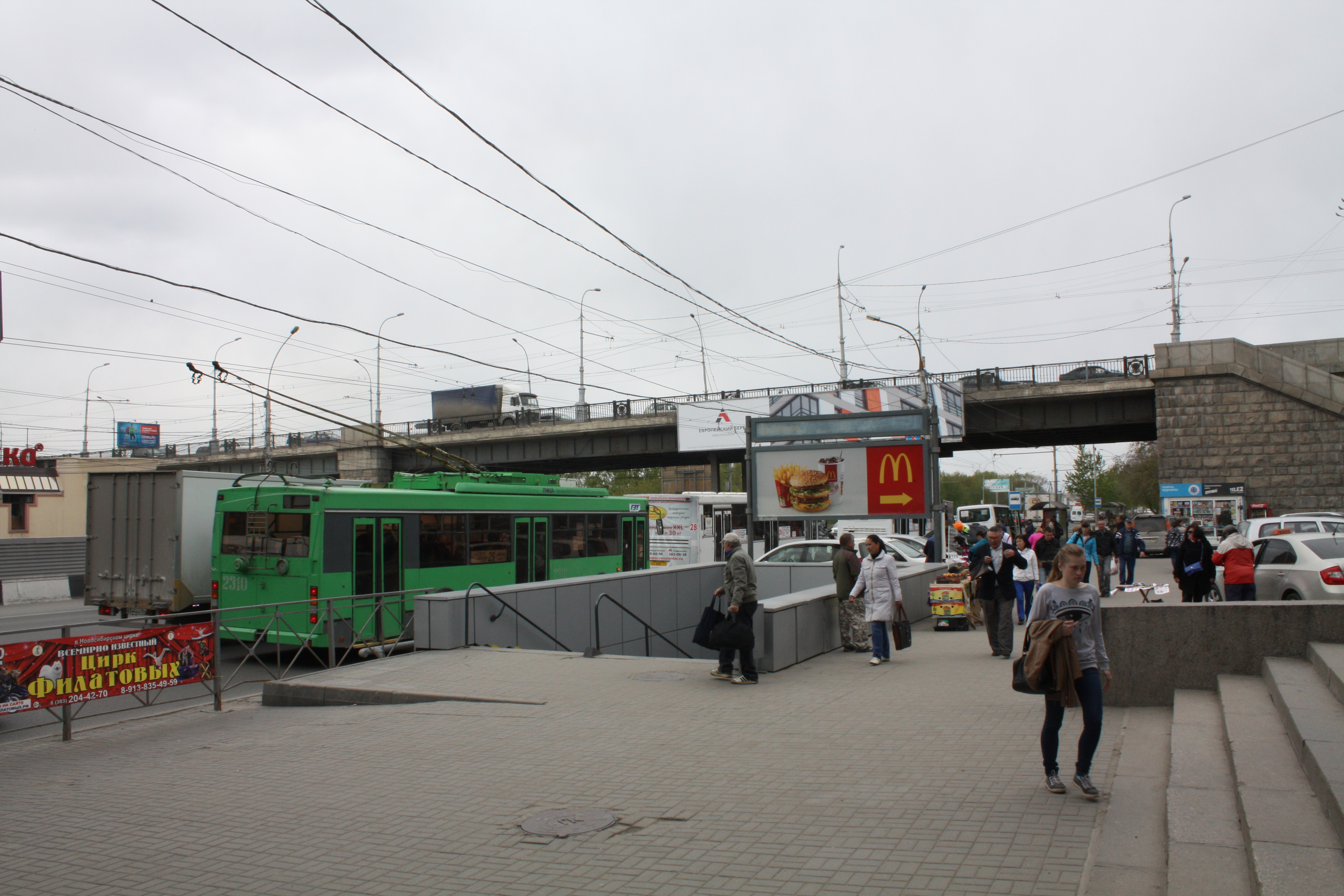

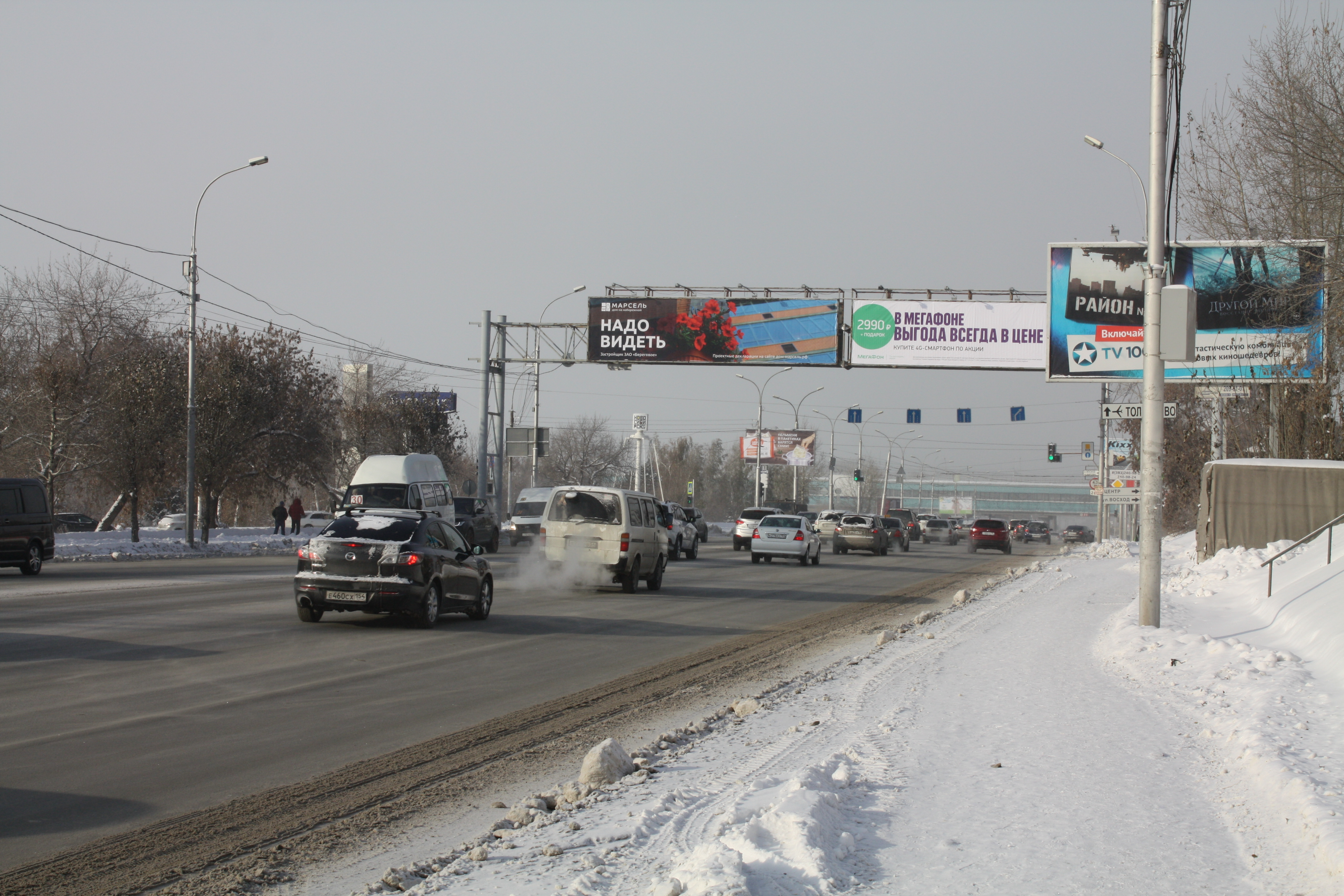

== Architecture ==
- Grigory Budagov's House is a building constructed in the late 1890s. In 2018, the building was restored.
- House of Samsonova is a building built in the early 20th century.
- Old House Drama Theater is a building of former school constructed in 1912 by Andrey Kryachkov. Currently, the building is occupied by Old House Theater founded in 1933.
- School No. 37 is a school building built in 1937.
- Bolshevistskaya Street 48 is a residential building built in 1937–1941.
- Church of St. Michael the Archangel is an orthodox church on the corner of Bolshevistskaya and Vybornaya streets.
- Drunk House is a postmodern building with curved facade lines. As of 2016, the building was occupied by a sauna and a night club.
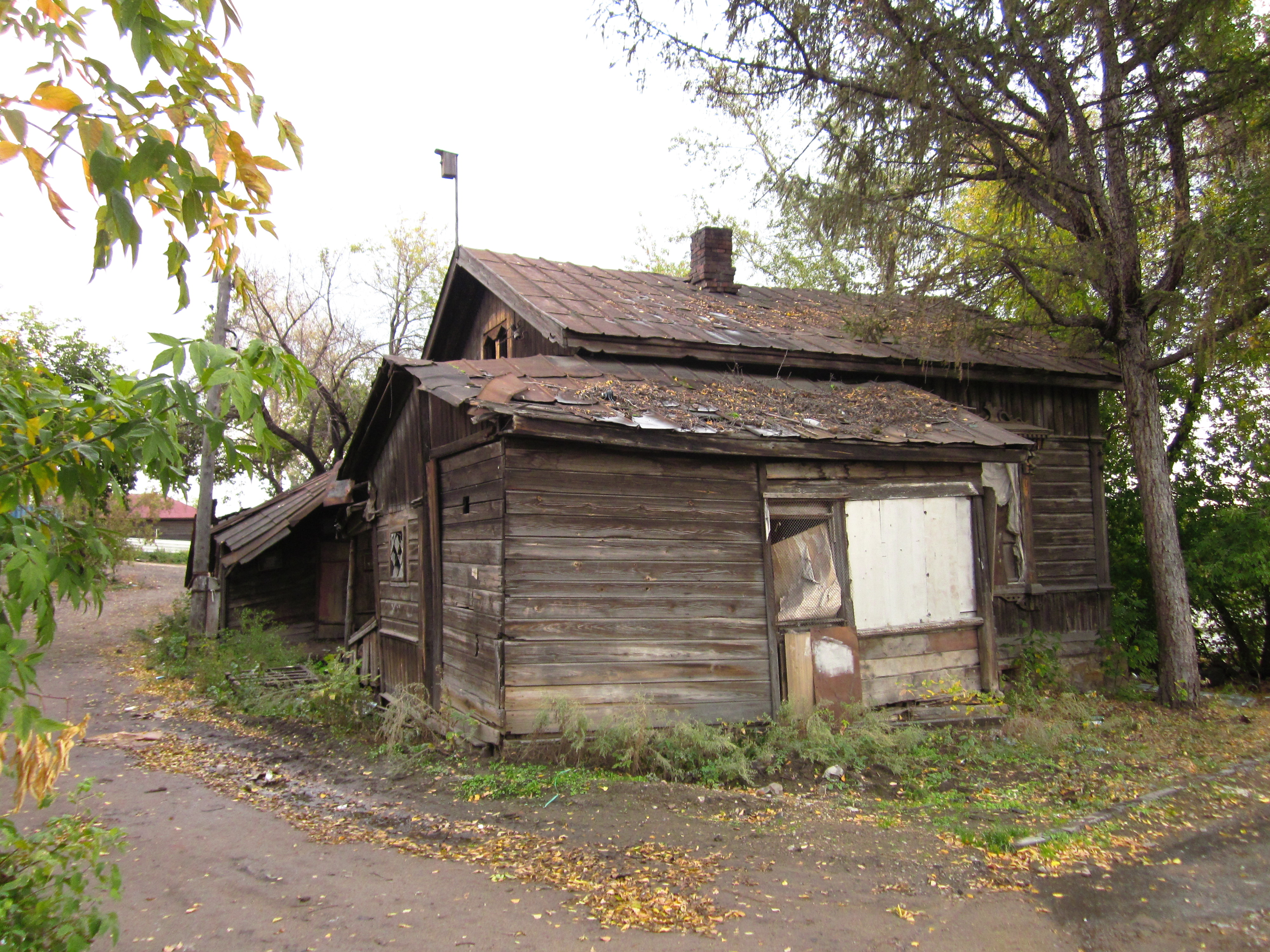
Grigory Budagov's House before restoration

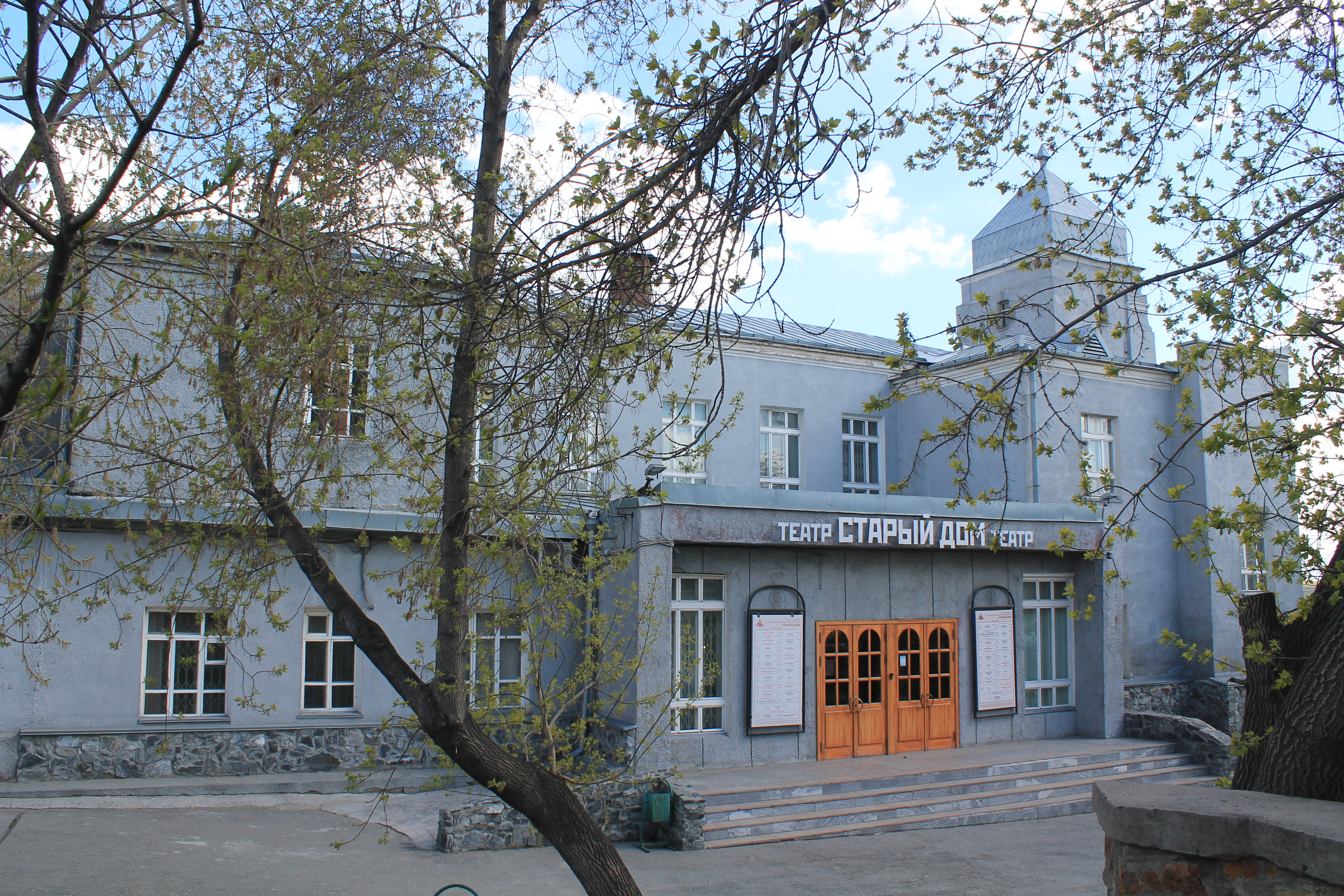
Old House Theater

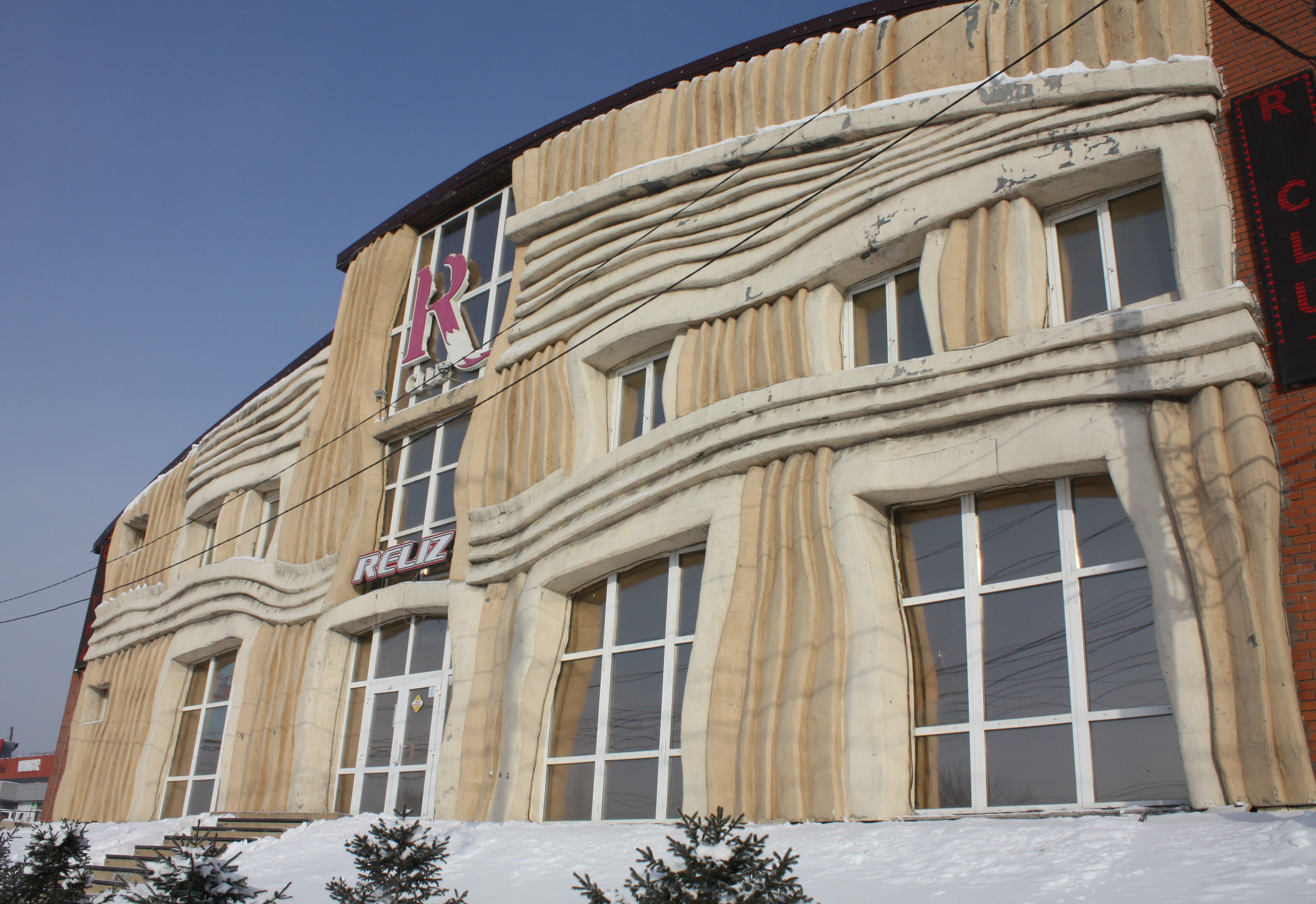
Drunk House

== Companies ==
- Trud Plant
- Novosibirsk Tools Plant

== Transportation ==
=== Road transport ===
Bolshevistskaya Street has road junctions with Kommunalny and Bugrinsky bridges. Road transport of the street: buses, trolleybuses and marshrutka.

==== Traffic congestion ====
The street is one of the busiest transport arteries of the city. Traffic congestion can reach more than 7 km.

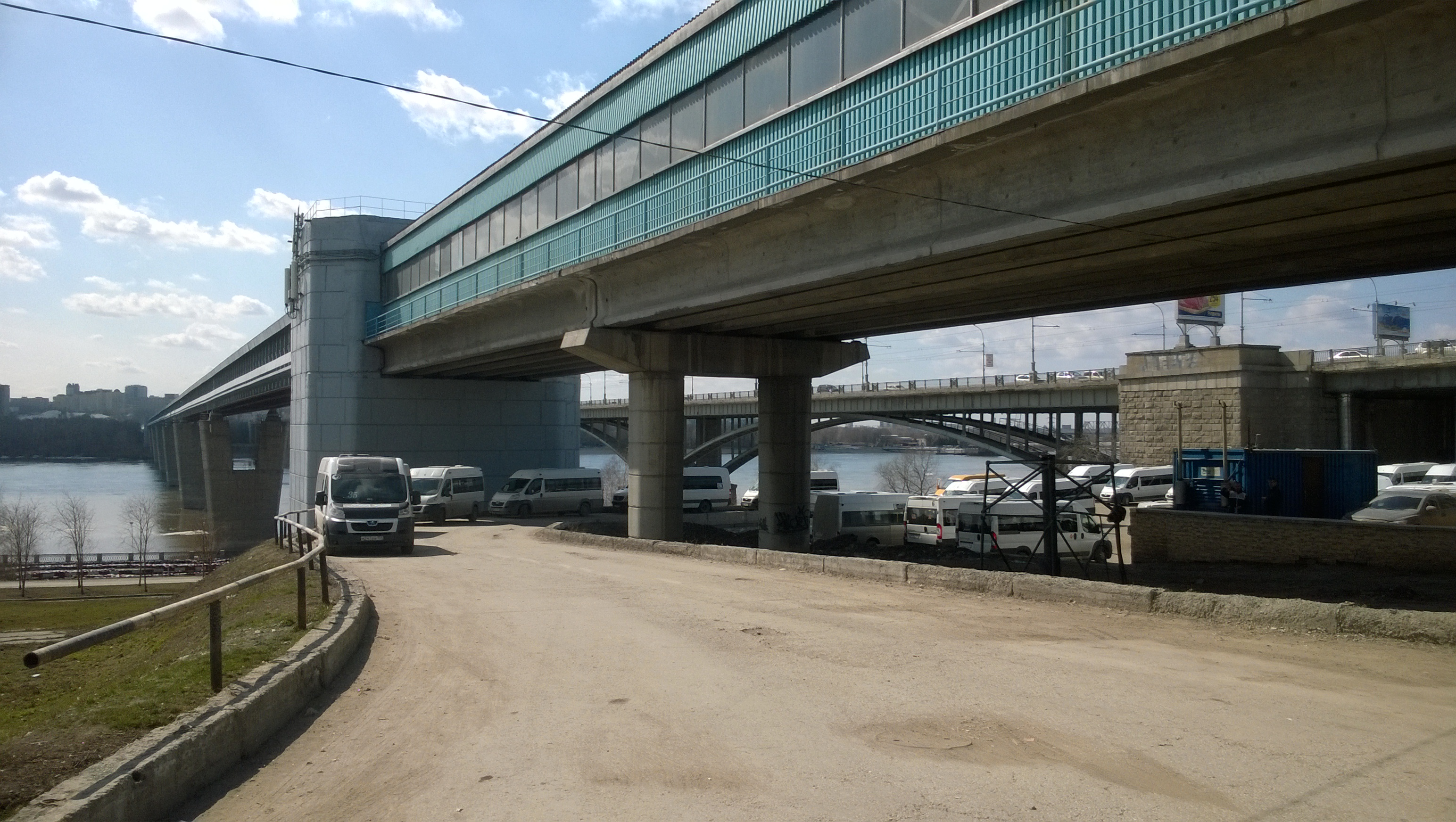
Marshrutka ending station under Novosibirsk Metro Bridge

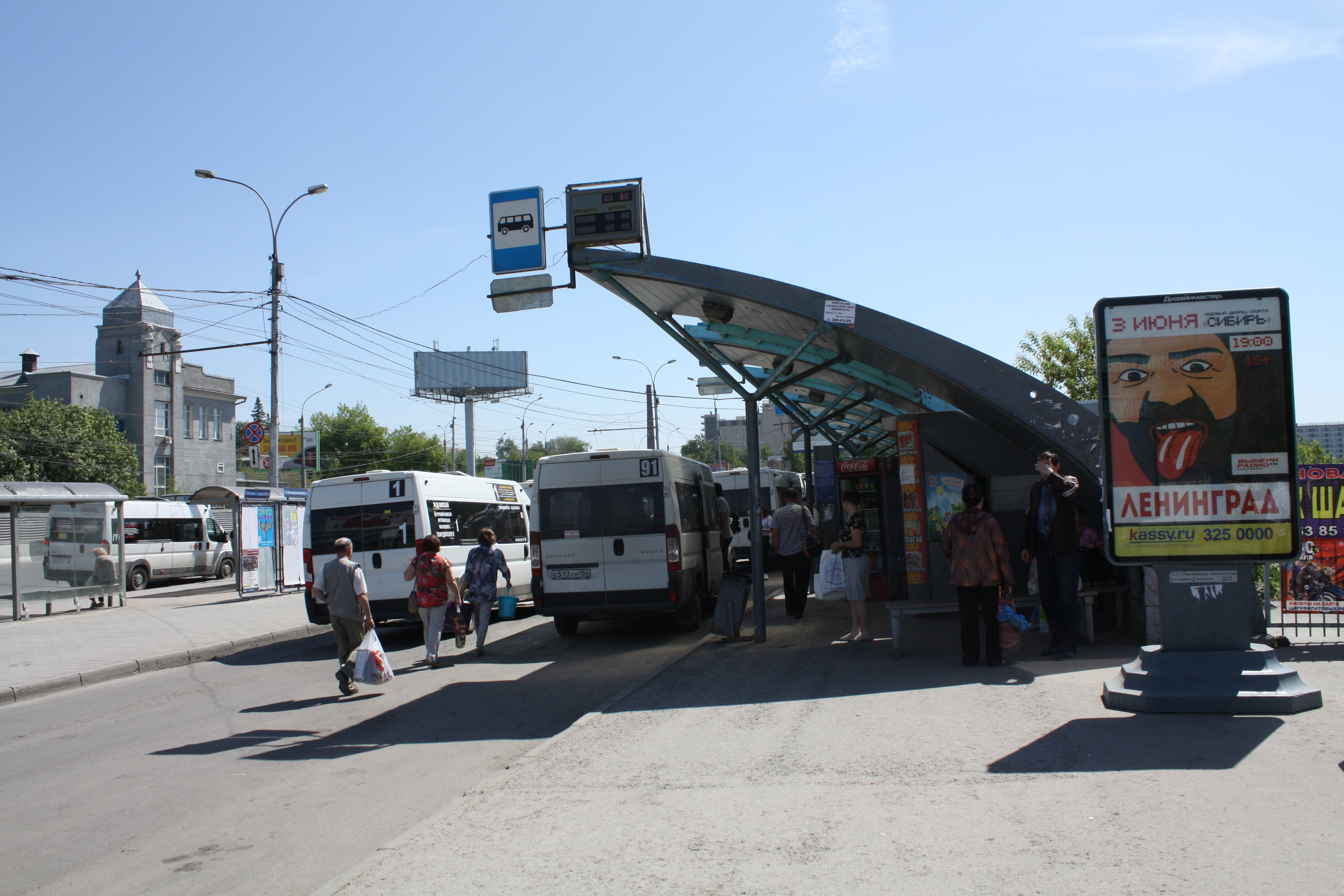
Bus stop on the street

=== Metro ===
Entrance to Rechnoy Vokzal Station is located on the street.

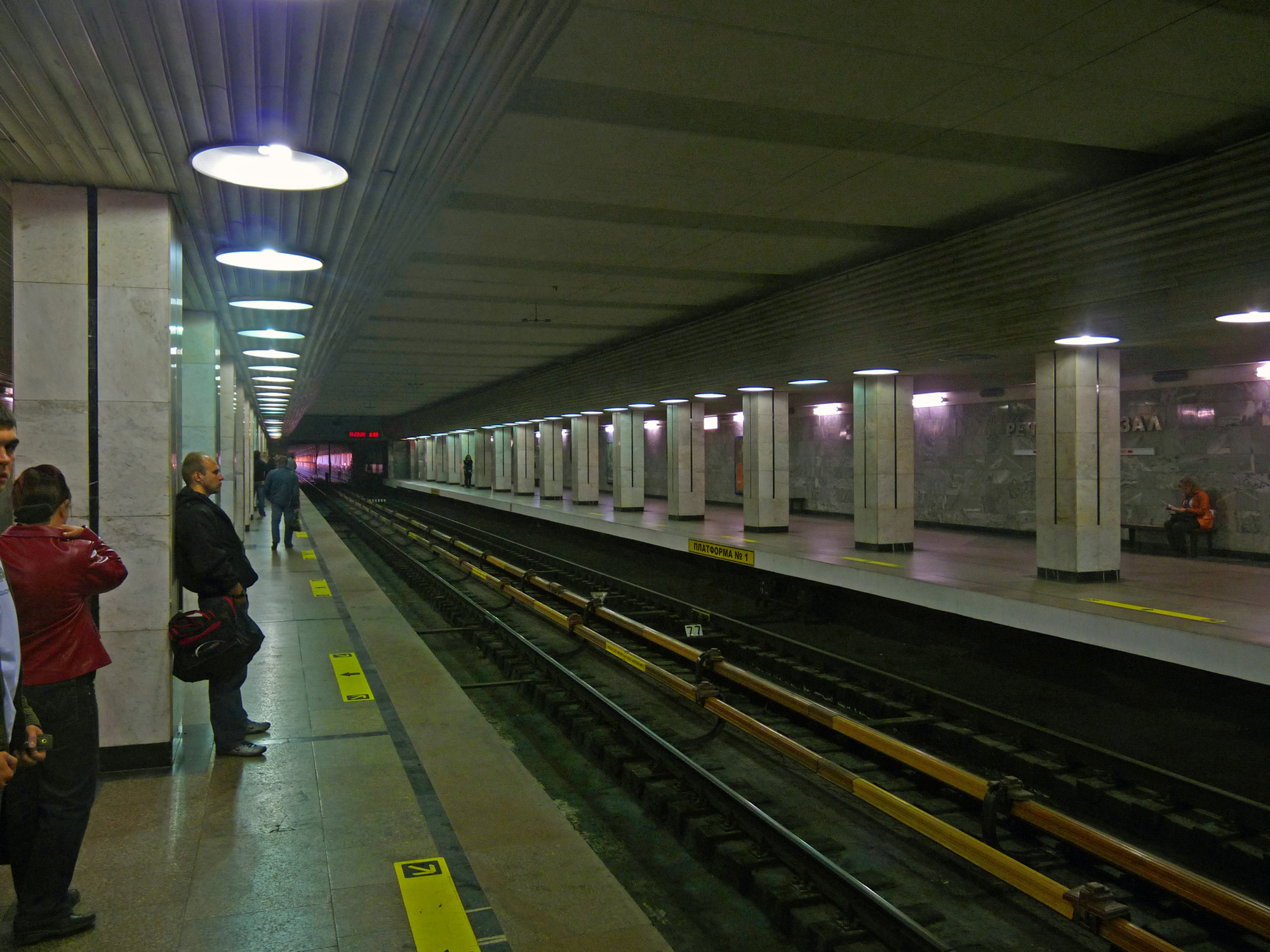
Rechnoy Vokzal Station

=== Water transport ===
Rechnoy Vokzal Passenger River Terminal is located between the street and the Ob River.

== See also ==
- Krasny Avenue
- Academician Lavrentyev Avenue
