= Novosibirsk Metro =

Rapid transit system in Novosibirsk, Russia

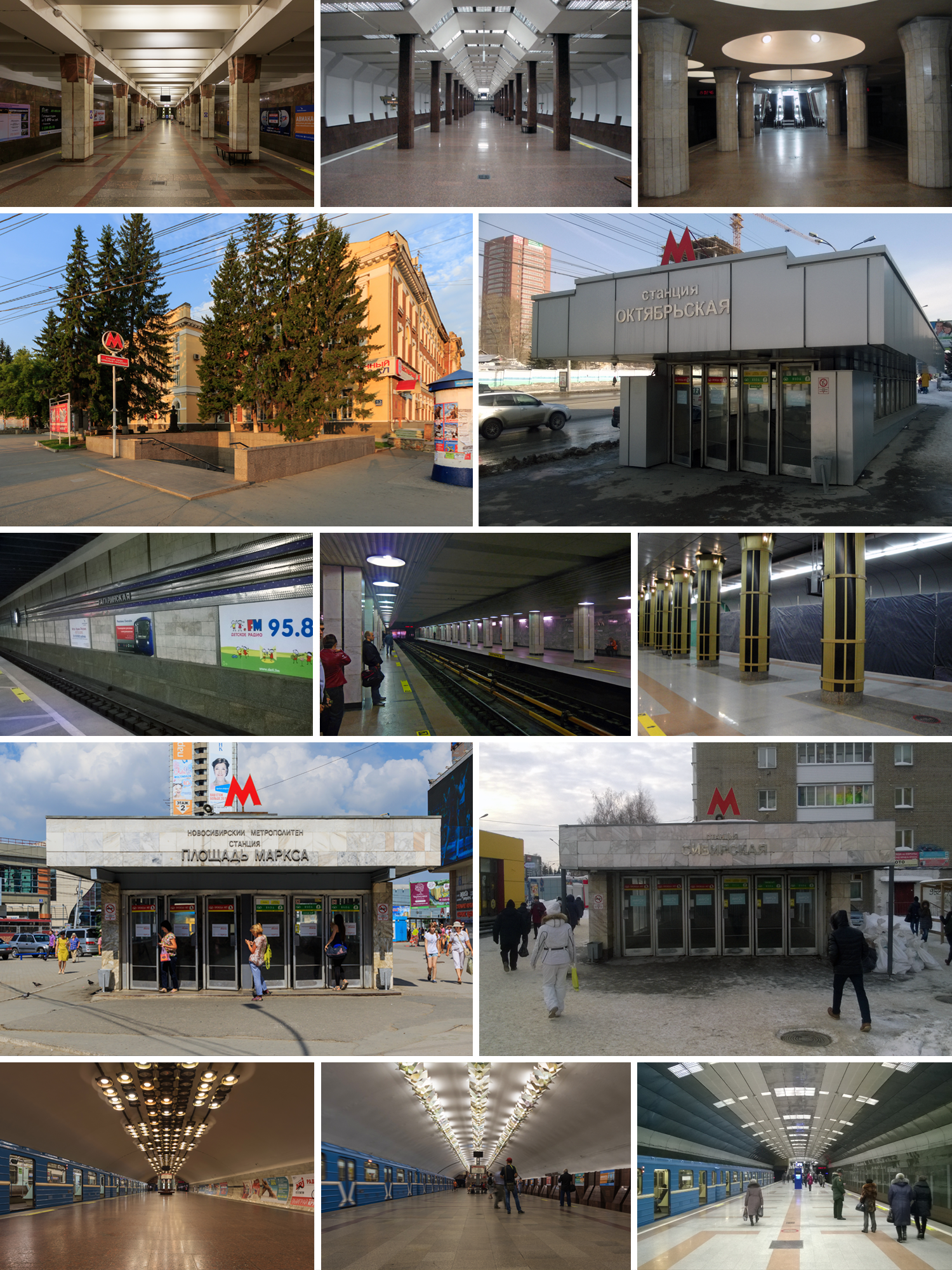

Overview
- Native name: Новосибирский метрополитен, Novosibirskiy metropoliten
- Locale: Novosibirsk, Russia
- Transit type: Rapid transit
- Number of lines: 2
- Number of stations: 14
- Annual ridership: 81,600,000 (2025)
- Website: nsk-metro.ru

Operation
- Began operation: 7 January 1986; 40 years ago
- Character: mostly underground, with elevated segments
- Number of vehicles: 26
- Train length: 4-5 cars
- Headway: 2 minutes, 45 seconds to 12 minutes

Technical
- System length: 15.9 km (9.9 mi)
- Average speed: 40 km/h (25 mph)
System map
Key

Novosibirsk Metro is a rapid transit system that serves Novosibirsk, Siberia, Russia. The system consists of 15.9 kilometres (9.9 mi) over track on two lines with 14 stations. It opened in January 1986, becoming the eleventh Metro in the USSR and the ninth in the Russian SFSR. It is Russia's fourth-largest system by the number of stations, behind Nizhny Novgorod's and the fifth-largest one by the system length, behind Nizhny Novgorod's and Kazan's. However, it is the third-busiest system in the country, at 81.6 million trips in 2025.

== History ==
Plans for a rapid transit system began to be formed in 1962. The construction project was approved by the Council of Ministers in November 1978, and on 12 May 1979 the first construction works began.

With wide experience in metro construction from the other metros of the USSR, it took seven-and-a-half years to complete the work on the five-station launch stage of the system. The commissioning certificate was signed by the state commission on 28 December 1985, and the Metro was opened for passengers on 7 January 1986, becoming the eleventh Metro in the USSR and the ninth in the Russian SFSR. Work quickly expanded to meet the original plans for a four-line 62 km network. However, the financial difficulties of the early 1990s meant that most of the work had to be frozen. Construction of new stations and tunnels resumed in the 2000s. After the opening of the 13th station, further development was suspended again due to financing gap.

== Overview ==
The system contains 14 stations on two lines. The stations are vividly decorated in late-Soviet style. Of the 13 stations, seven are three-span shallow column stations (Studencheskaya, Oktyabrskaya, Krasny Prospekt, Gagarinskaya, Ploshchad Garina-Mikhaylovskogo, Sibirskaya, Marshala Pokryshkina), one is two-span shallow column station (Zolotaya Niva), four are single-vault stations (Ploshchad Lenina, Ploshchad Marksa, Zayeltsovskaya, Beryozovaya Roshcha). All of these stations have island platform. There is also one station with side platforms (Rechnoy Vokzal) that is both above- and below-ground that follows a 2145 m covered bridge span of the Ob, the longest in the world. Krasny Prospekt and Sibirskaya are transfer stations connected to each other by dual pedestrian tunnel.

The Novosibirsk Metro transports about 235,300 passengers daily. It transported 86.1 million passengers in 2024.

== Lines ==
#	Name	Opened	Newest station added	Length	Stations
1	Leninskaya; Ленинская; Lenin Line	1986	2025	10.5 km (6.5 mi)	9
2	Dzerzhinskaya; Дзержинская; Dzerzhinsky Line	1987	2010	5.5 km (3.4 mi)	5
Total				16.0 km (9.9 mi)	14

== Stations ==
Line	English transcription	Russian Cyrillic	English translation	Connection	Opened	
Leninskaya	Zayeltsovskaya	Заельцовская	Beyond the Yeltsovka River		2 April 1992	Category:Zayeltsovskaya station (Novosibirsk metro) on Wikimedia Commons
Leninskaya	Gagarinskaya	Гагаринская	Gagarin		2 April 1992	Category:Gagarinskaya station (Novosibirsk metro) on Wikimedia Commons
Leninskaya	Krasny Prospekt	Красный Проспект	Red Avenue	Sibirskaya	7 January 1986	Category:Krasny Prospekt station (Novosibirsk metro) on Wikimedia Commons
Leninskaya	Ploshchad Lenina	Площадь Ленина	Lenin Square		7 January 1986	Category:Ploshchad Lenina Station (Novosibirsk Metro) on Wikimedia Commons
Leninskaya	Oktyabrskaya	Октябрьская	October		7 January 1986	Category:Oktyabrskaya station (Novosibirsk metro) on Wikimedia Commons
Leninskaya	Rechnoy Vokzal	Речной Вокзал	River Passenger Terminal		7 January 1986	Category:Rechnoy Vokzal station (Novosibirsk metro) on Wikimedia Commons
Leninskaya	Sportivnaya	Спортивная	Sports		5 September 2025	Category:Category:Sportivnaya Station (Novosibirsk Metro) on Wikimedia Commons
Leninskaya	Studencheskaya	Студенческая	Student		7 January 1986	Category:Studencheskaya Station (Novosibirsk Metro) on Wikimedia Commons
Leninskaya	Ploshchad Marksa	Площадь Маркса	Karl Marx Square		26 July 1991	Category:Ploschad Marksa station (Novosibirsk metro) on Wikimedia Commons
Dzerzhinskaya	Ploshchad Garina-Mikhaylovskogo	Площадь Гарина-Михайловского	Garin-Mikhailovsky Square		31 December 1987	Category:Ploschad Garina-Mihaylovskogo station (Novosibirsk Metro) on Wikimedia Commons
Dzerzhinskaya	Sibirskaya	Сибирская	Siberia	Krasny Prospekt	31 December 1987	Category:Sibirskaya Station (Novosibirsk Metro) on Wikimedia Commons
Dzerzhinskaya	Marshala Pokryshkina	Маршала Покрышкина	Marshal Pokryshkin		28 December 2000	Category:Marshala Pokryshkina Station on Wikimedia Commons
Dzerzhinskaya	Beryozovaya Roshcha	Берёзовая Роща	Birch Grove		25 June 2005	Category:Category:Beryozovaya Roshcha Station (Novosibirsk Metro) on Wikimedia Commons
Dzerzhinskaya	Zolotaya Niva	Золотая Нива	Golden Grainfield		7 October 2010	Category:Zolotaya Niva station (Novosibirsk metro) on Wikimedia Commons

== Rolling stock ==
The Novosibirsk Metro's rolling stock is represented by such models of metro railroad cars as Soviet 81-717/81-714 and Russian 81–540.2/541.2. A new five-car 81-725.3/726.3/727.3 Ermak train entered service on 21 October 2025 in the Novosibirsk Metro.

As for 2022, the total number of trains is 26 (104 cars).

== Gallery ==
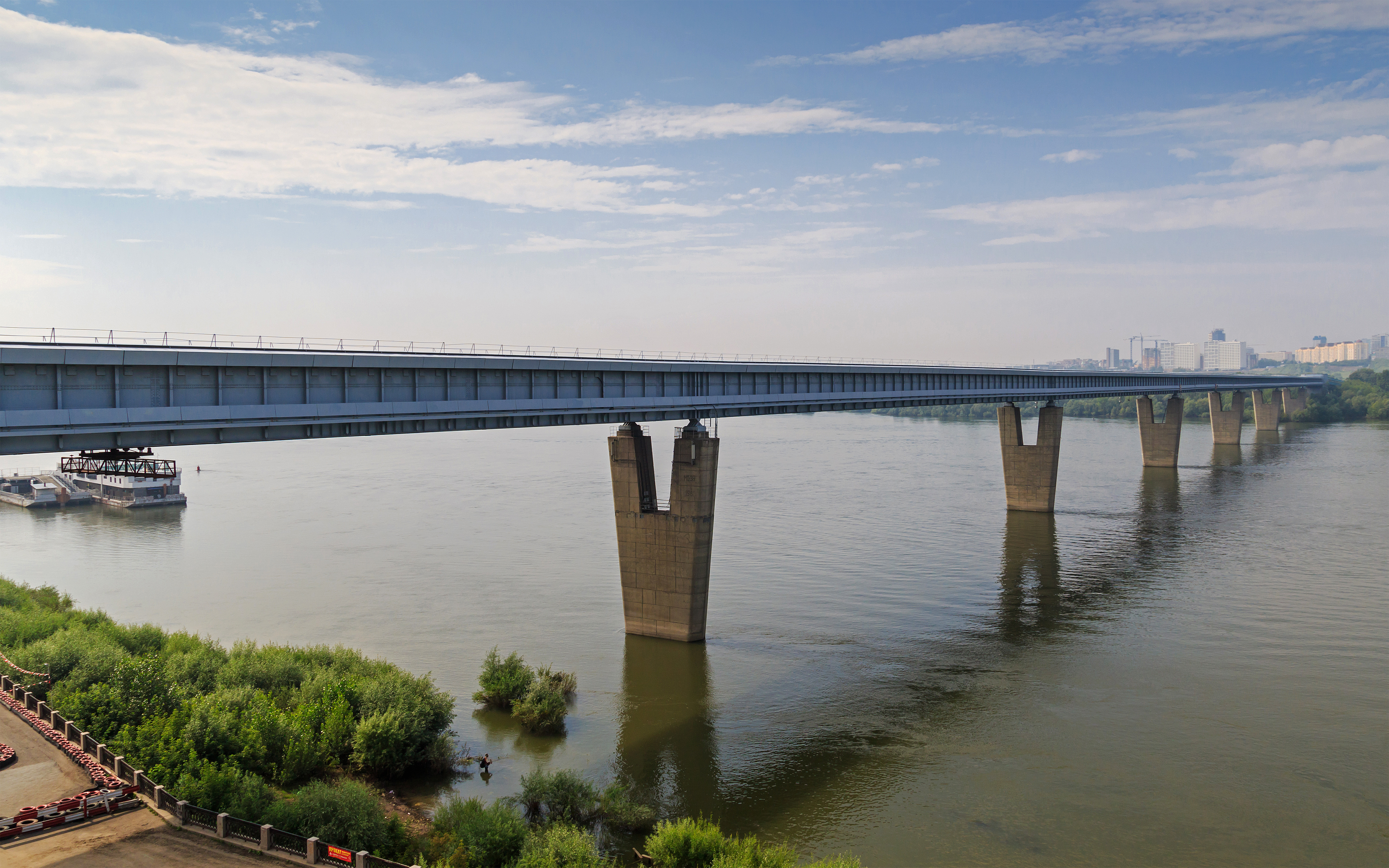
Novosibirsk Metro Bridge over the Ob

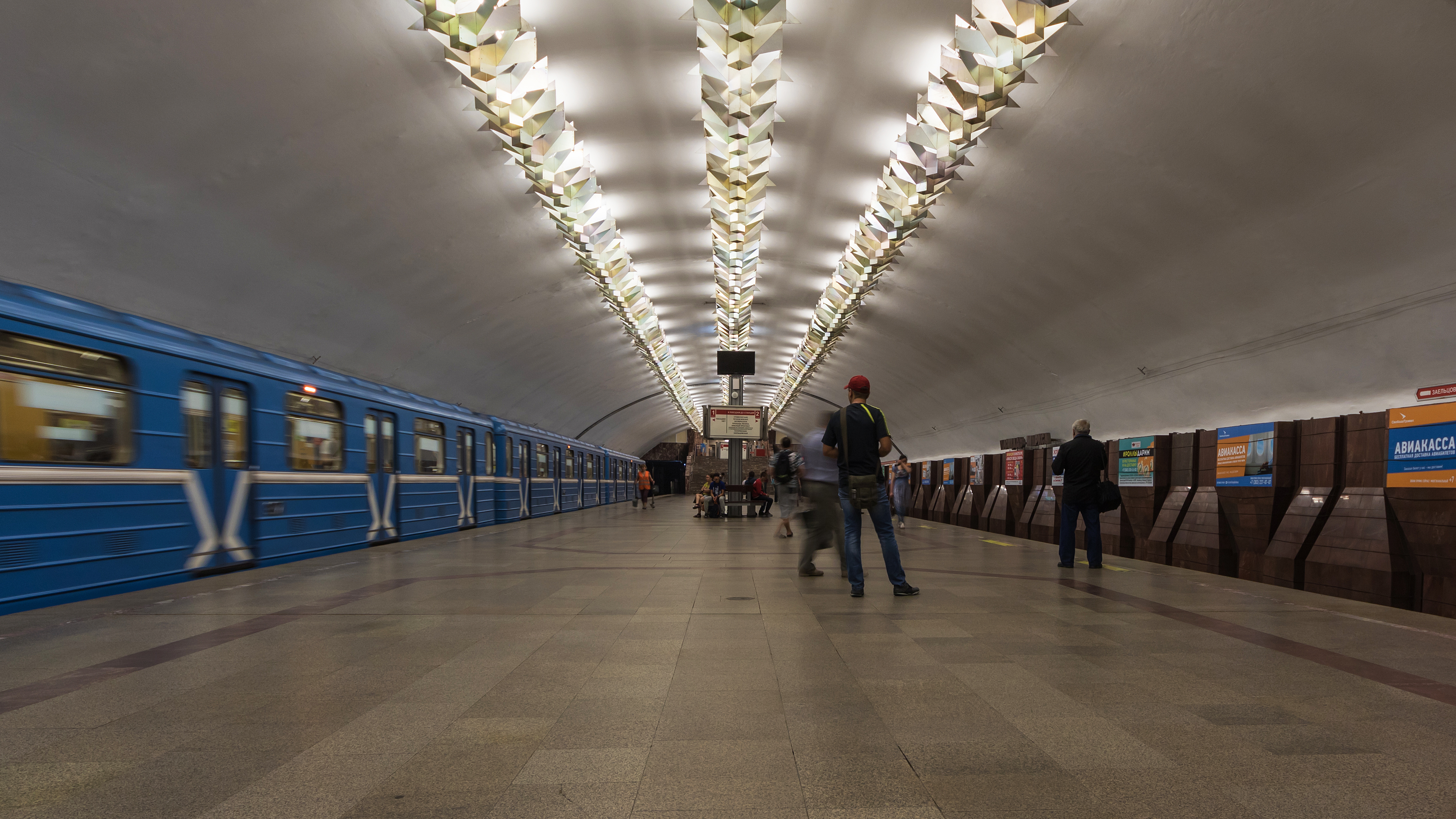
Ploshchad Marksa Station

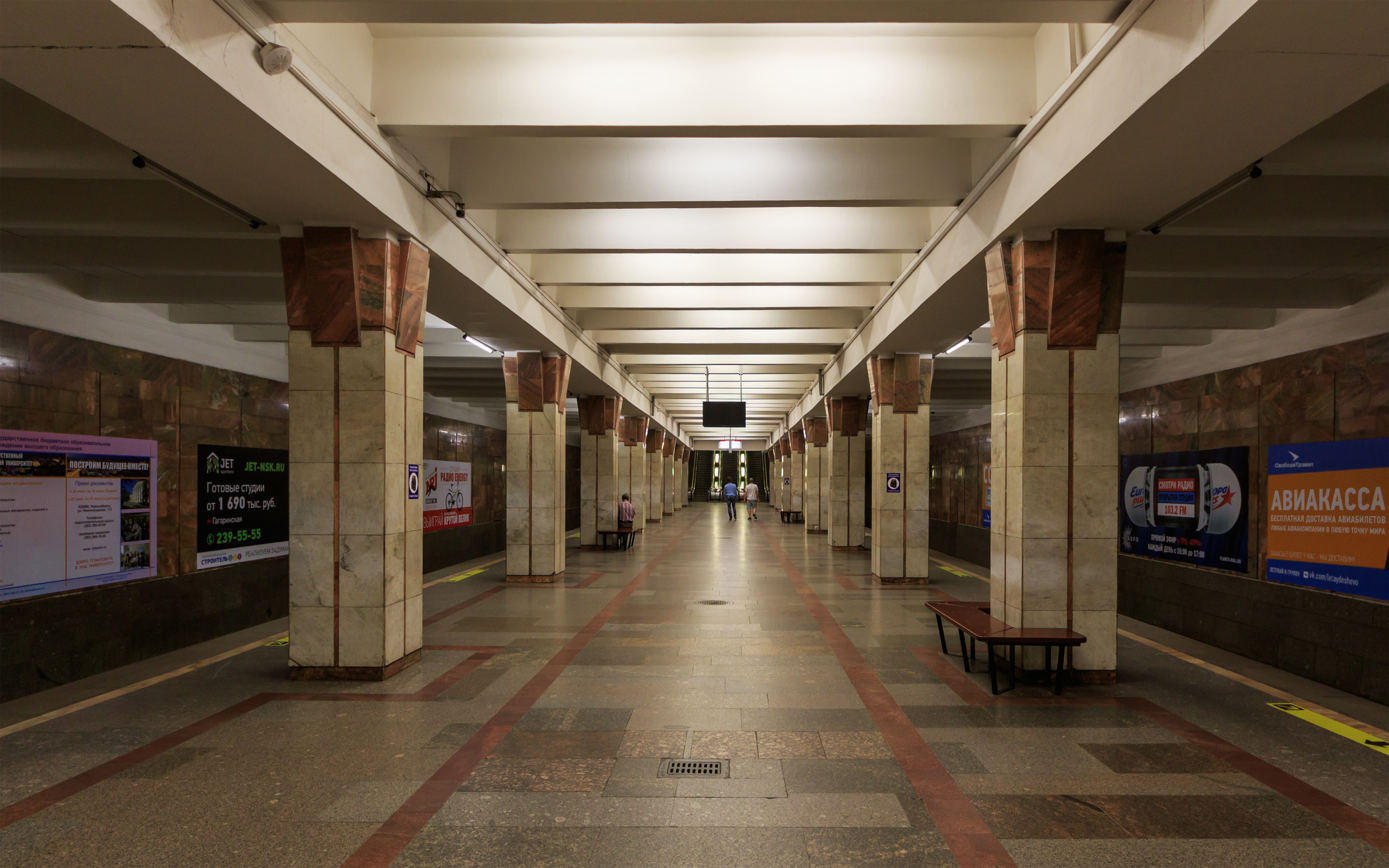
Oktyabrskaya Station

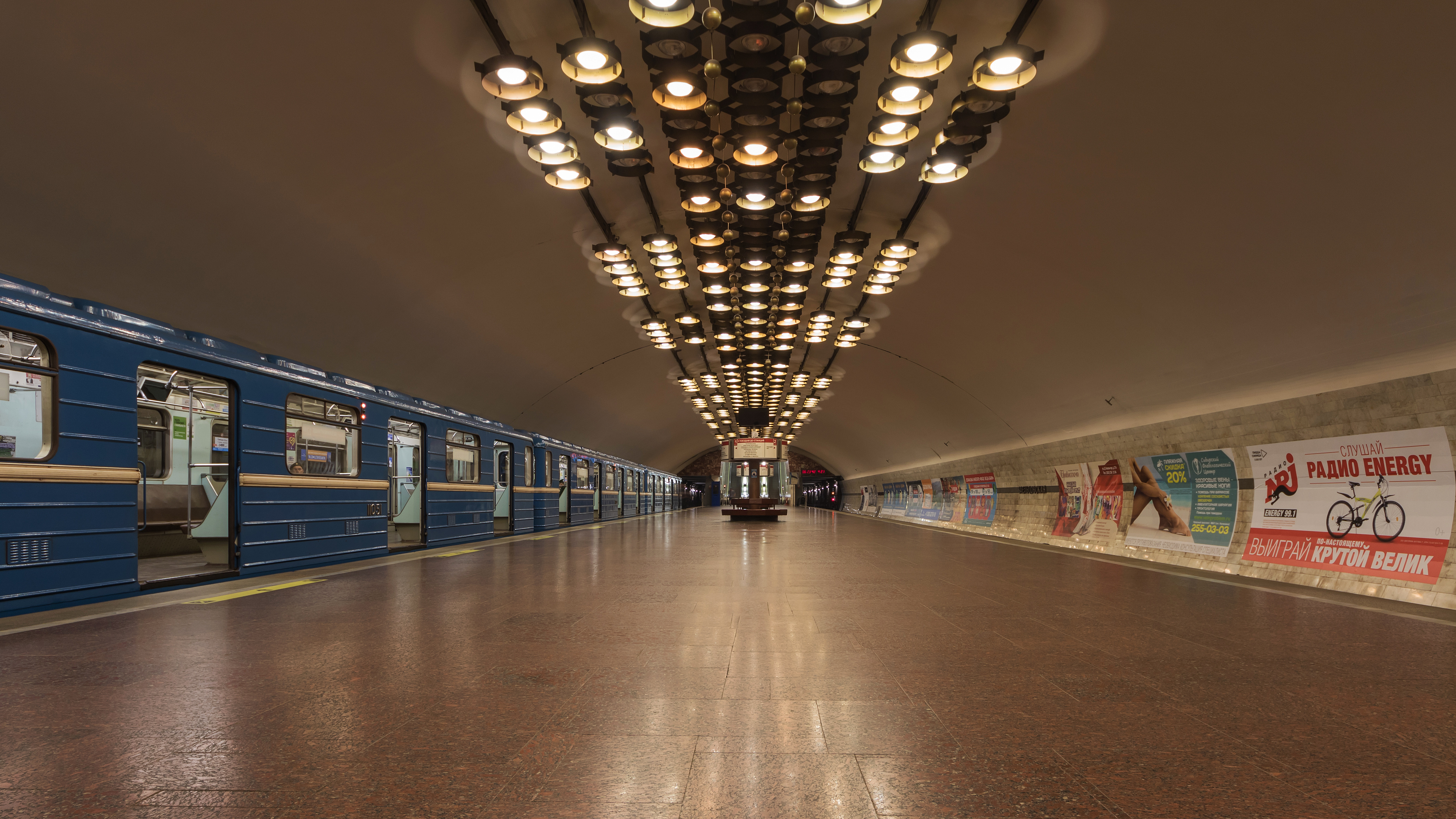
Zayeltsovskaya Station

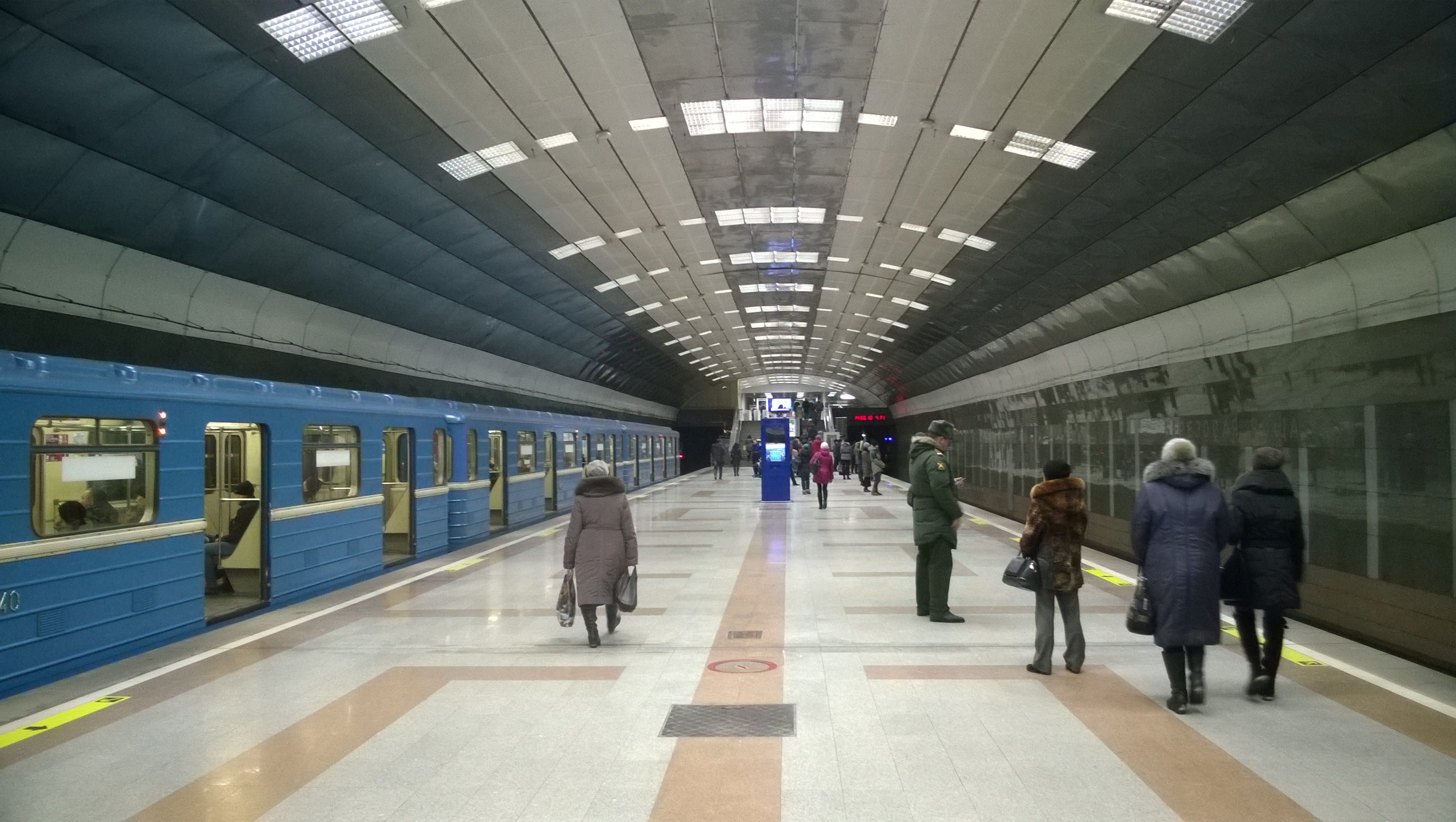
Beryozovaya Roshcha Station
