= Spartywnaya =

Minsk Metro station

Spartywnaya Спартыўная
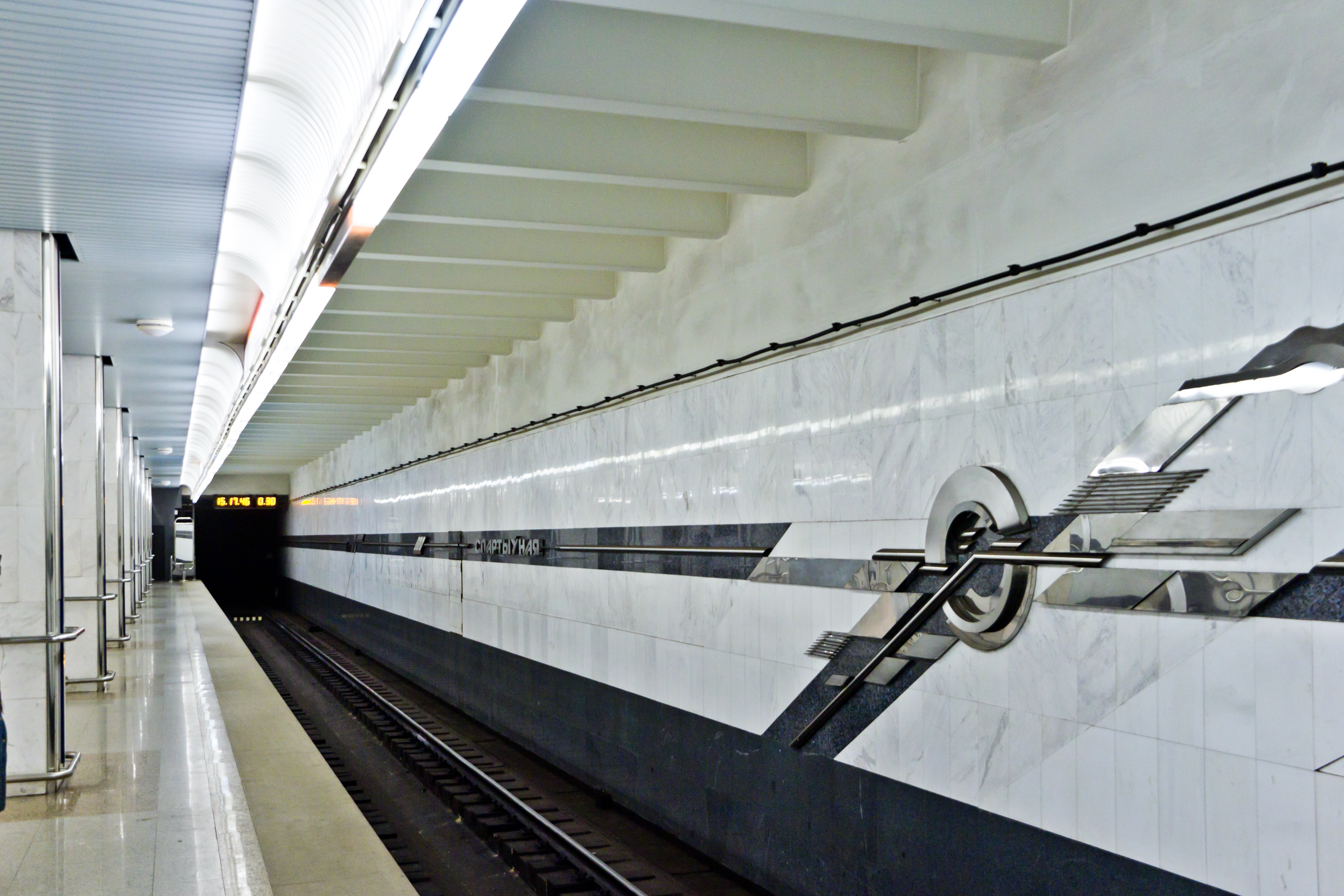
- Station Hall

General information
- Coordinates: 53°54′30″N 27°28′45″E
- System: Minsk Metro
- Owner: Minsk Metro
- Platforms: 1 Island platform
- Tracks: 2

Construction
- Structure type: Underground

Other information
- Station code: 221

History
- Opened: 7 November 2005; 20 years ago

Services
Preceding station	Minsk Metro	Following station
Kuntsawshchyna towards Kamyennaya Horka	Awtazavodskaya line	Pushkinskaya towards Mahilyowskaya
Location
- Location within Belarus

Spartywnaya (Belarusian: Спартыўная; Russian: Спортивная) is a Minsk Metro station. It was opened on 7 November 2005.

== Gallery ==
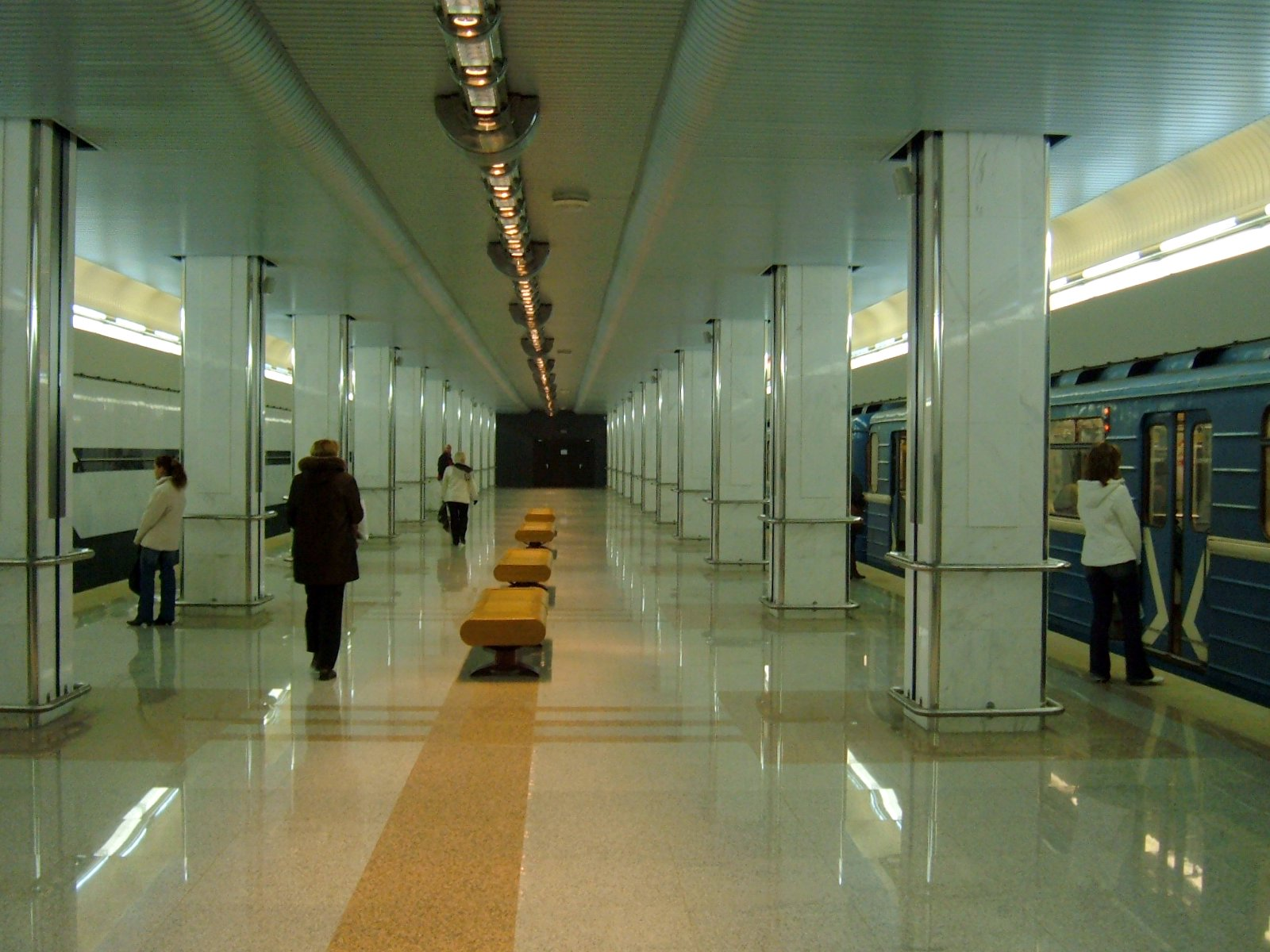

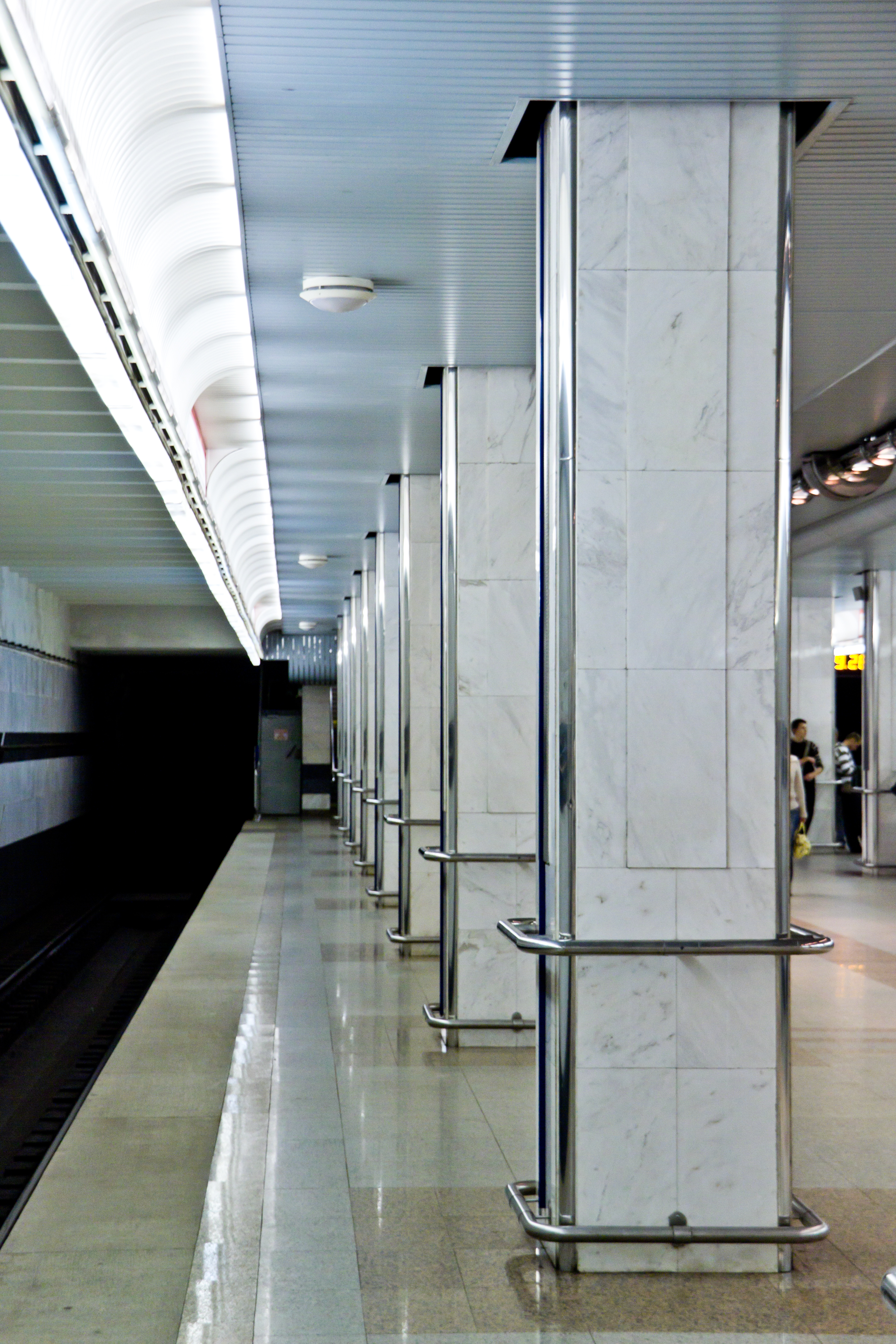

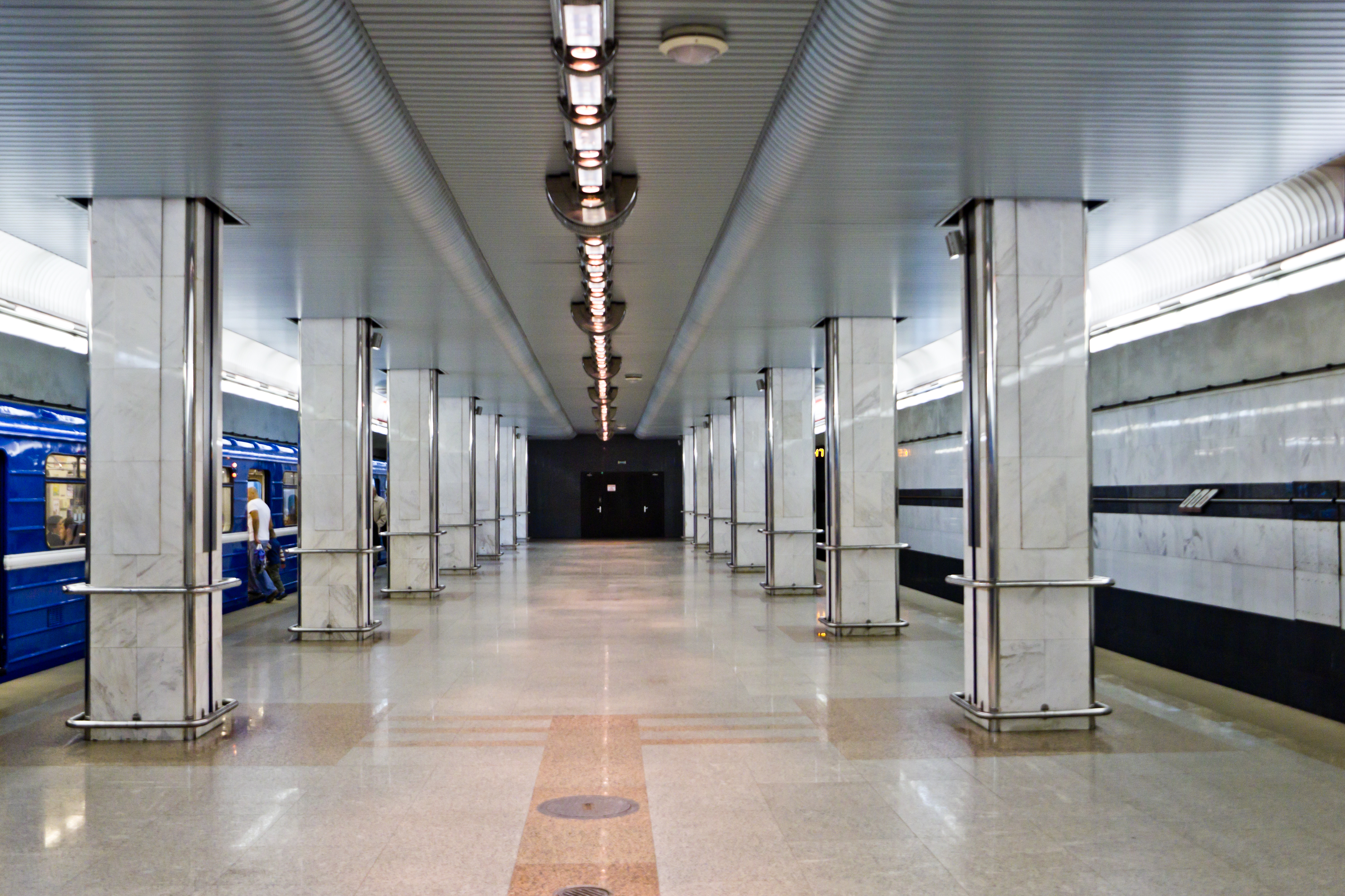

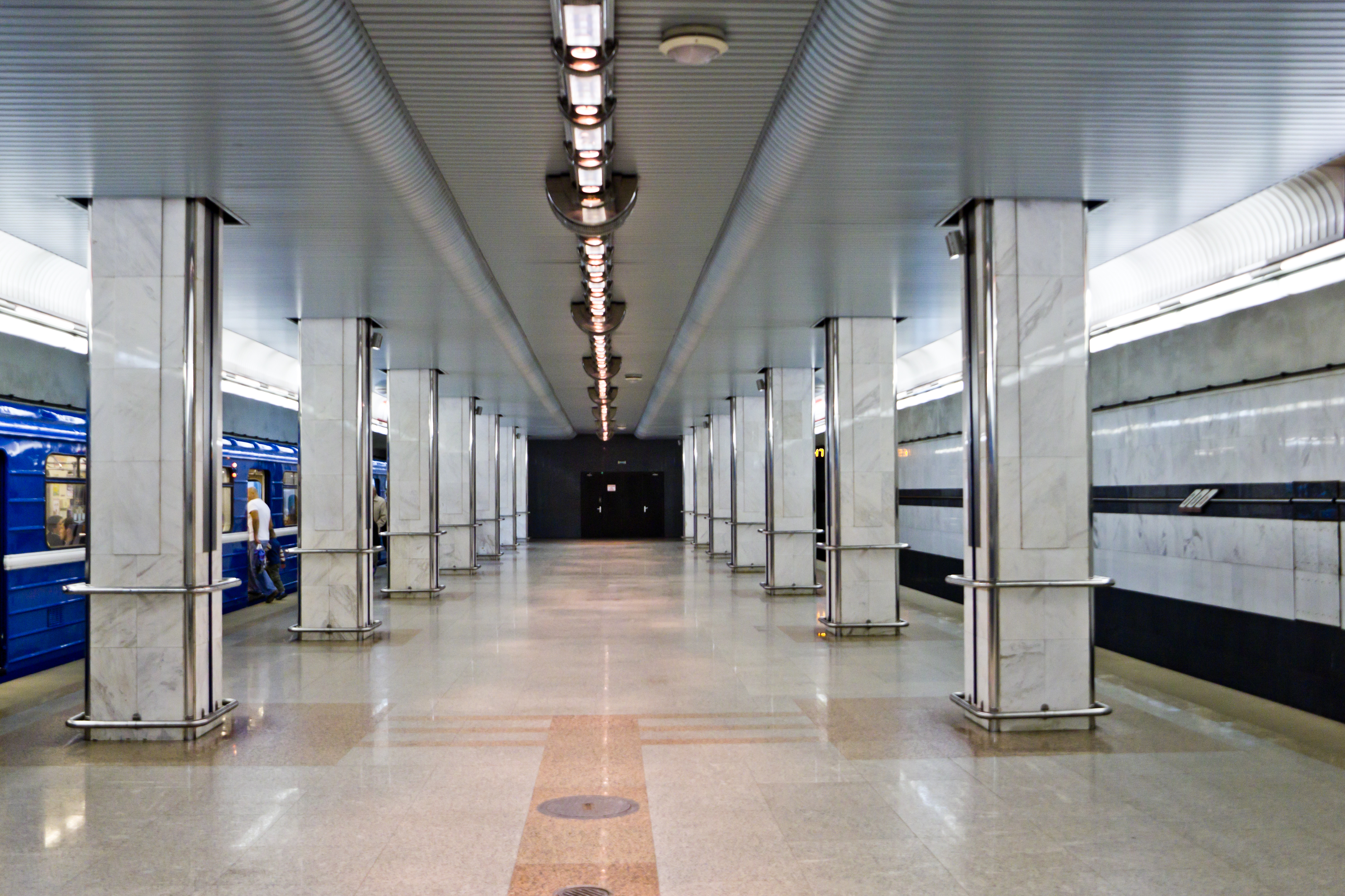
