= Leninskaya Line =

Leninskaya Line (Russian: Ле́нинская линия), literally the Lenin Line, is a Novosibirsk Metro line. It consists of nine stations along 10.5 kilometres (6.5 mi) of track. It bisects the city on a northwest–southeast axis before making a 90-degree turn and crossing the river Ob river on an enclosed bridge.

Leninskaya was Novosibirsk's first Metro line, and opened in 1986 with five stations. It was extended twice, in 1991 and 1992, adding three stations before financial difficulties slowed the addition of new stations.

== Timeline ==
Segment	Opened
Krasny Prospekt – Studencheskaya	7 January 1986
Studencheskaya – Ploshchad Marksa	26 July 1991
Krasny Prospekt – Zayeltsovskaya	2 April 1992
Sportivnaya	5 September 2025

== Connections ==
#	Transfer to	At
2	Dzerzhinskaya Line	Krasny Prospekt

== Rolling stock ==
The line is served by the city's single depot Eltsovskoe, and currently 18 four-car 81-717/714 trains are assigned to it.

== Recent developments and future plans ==
Since the 1990s, there have been several proposals to extend the line to Ploshchad Stanislavskogo. Initially, the city planned to start construction in 2010; however, this did not materialize. In 2014, the city indicated that it would move forward on planning for two new stations on the Dzerzhinskaya Line instead. In 2018, the mayor of Novosibirsk stated that it was necessary to build the Ploshchad Stanislavskogo station to relieve automobile traffic. The mayor estimated the cost to complete three new stations would be about 20 billion rubles.
