= Ploshchad Marksa station =

Novosibirsk Metro station

Ploshchad Marksa
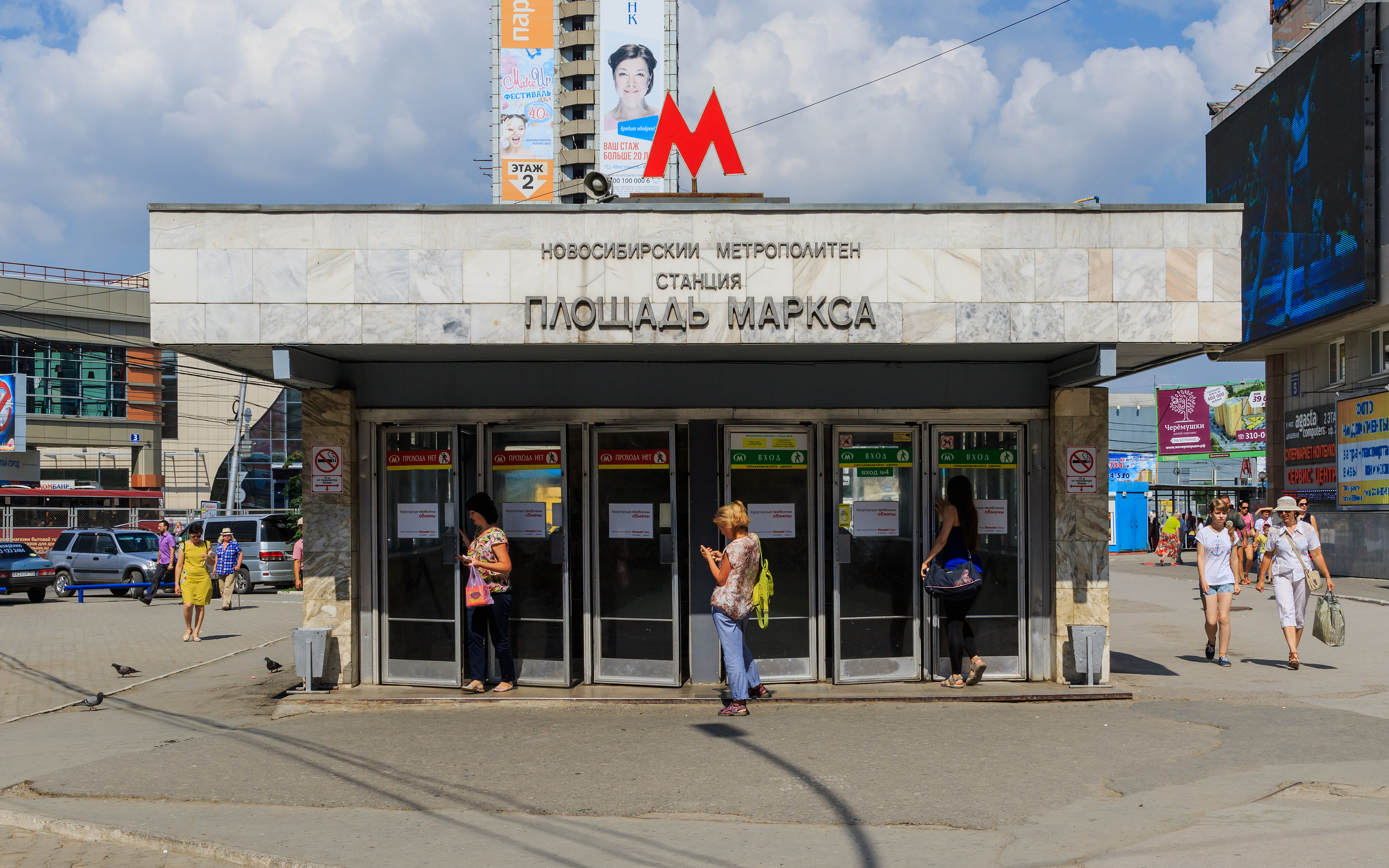
- One of the station's entrances in 2016

General information
- Location: Karla Marksa Square, Novosibirsk
- Coordinates: 54.983056°N 82.893333°E
- System: Novosibirsk Metro
- Owner: Novosibirsk Metro
- Line: Leninskaya Line
- Platforms: 1 island platform
- Tracks: 2

Construction
- Structure type: Underground

History
- Opened: 26 July 1991; 35 years ago

Passengers
- 2010: 39,300 (daily average) ▲19.4%

Services
Preceding station	Novosibirsk Metro	Following station
Studencheskaya towards Zayeltsovskaya	Leninskaya Line	Terminus
Location

Ploshchad Marksa (Note: Площадь Маркса. The name of the station literally means "Square of Marx" in Russian.) is a station of the Novosibirsk Metro, in the Leninsky District of Novosibirsk. It is found at the city's Marx Square, named after Karl Marx. Ploshchad Marksa station is an underground stop with one island platforms serving as the southern terminus of Leninskaya Line, followed by Studencheskaya station.

Ploshchad Marksa station was inaugurated on 26 July 1991, with operations beginning two days later, becoming the last station inaugurated in the Soviet Union. It provided service north toward Krasny Prospekt station. The station was originally scheduled to open in 1990, but, due to political changes in the country and disruptions in funding and the supply of materials, it opened the next year.

Since its opening, Ploshchad Marksa station has become an important stop on the system, serving a large number of passengers.

== History and construction ==
Preparations for the station's construction began in 1985. The station's trench was dug by the fall of 1986. In January 1988, work was underway at the construction site to build the traction substation, the ventilation shaft, and the second entrance hall.

Ploshchad Marksa station was built along with other stations in the line and was expected to open in 1990. However, there were political changes in the Soviet Union that year, and the supply of materials and their funding received disruption. For example, in May, one of the suppliers stopped delivering Syuskyuyansaari granite, which was intended for the station's interior finishes. The final step in resuming construction was to secure a supply of a fiberglass-reinforced bituminous waterproofing membrane that was in short supply at the time. By the spring of 1991, the finishing work on the station's concrete vault had been completed, and light fixtures with decorative grilles had been installed. The wall and floor finishes in the entrance lobbies had also been completed. Before the station's opening, the outdoor entrance pavilions were built, and the temporary railings were replaced with permanent ones. Train testing took place in April.

Ploshchad Marksa station opened on 26 July 1991, providing service two days later. It became the last station opened during the Soviet Union era before its dissolution on 26 December 1991. Following its opening, Ploshchad Marksa station quickly replaced Studencheskaya's passenger preference.

=== Incidents ===
The station was the target of a fake bomb threat in January 2012.

== Location and layout ==
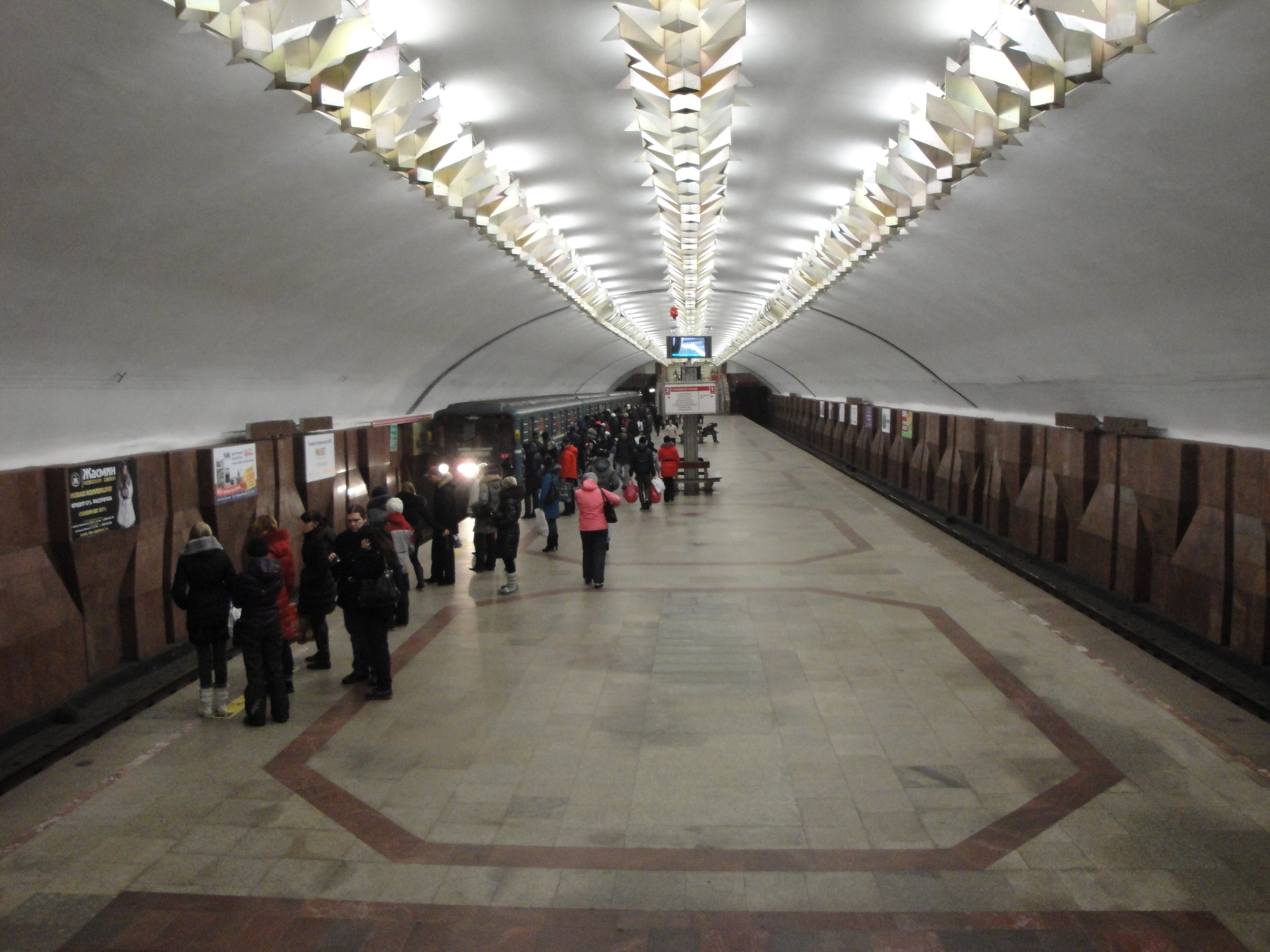
The station's platform in 2012

Ploshchad Marksa station is found below Marx Square, in the Leninsky District. The station has six exits that were built in stages. As of 2010, it was the busiest station in the system, accounting for 19.4 per cent of total ridership, with an average of 39,300 passengers per day.

== See also ==
- Karl Marx Square Water Tower, found near the station
