= Zayeltsovskaya station =

Novosibirsk Metro Station

Zayeltsovskaya
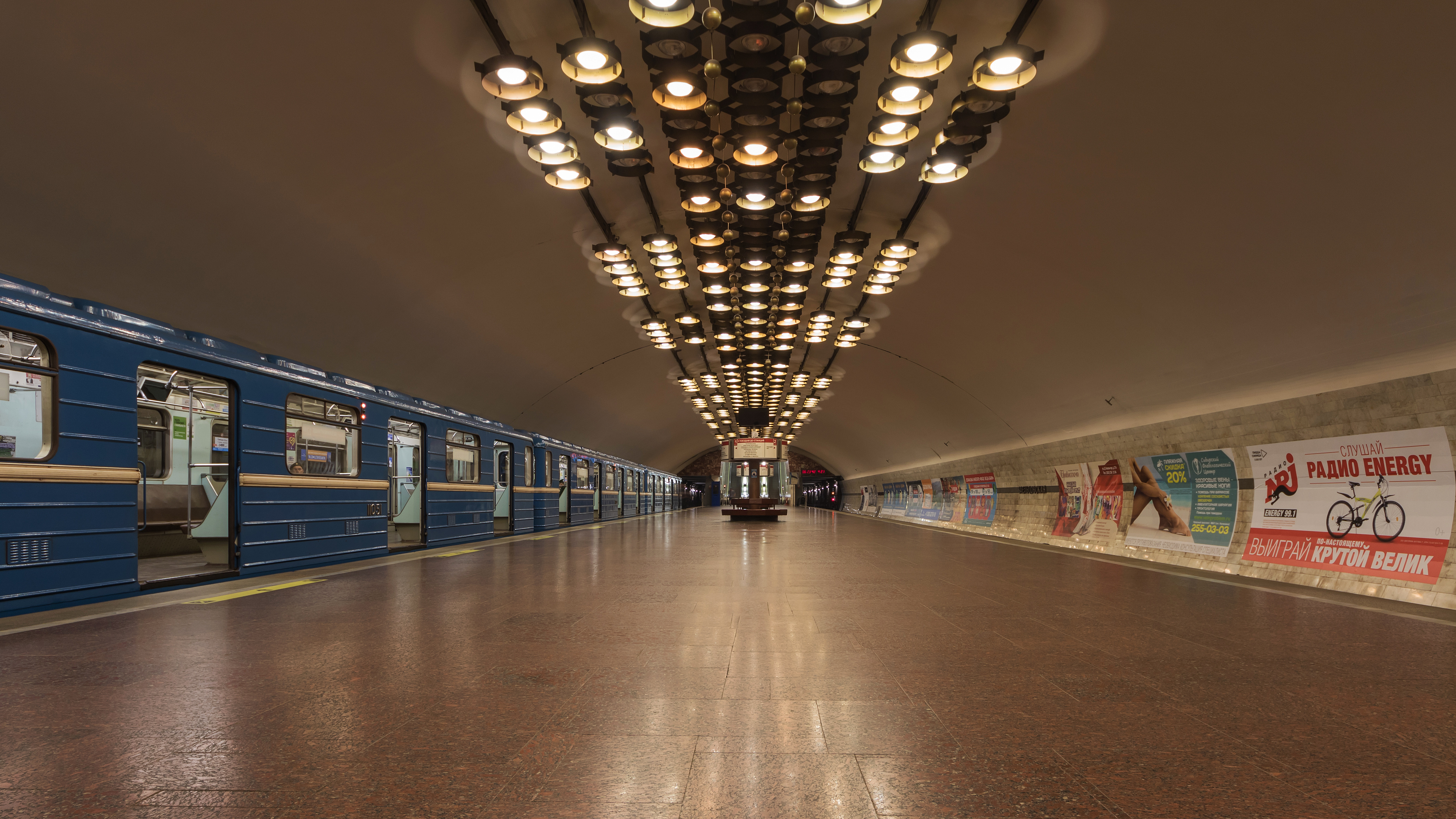
- Station Hall

General information
- Coordinates: 55.059333°N 82.912872°E
- System: Novosibirsk Metro
- Owner: Novosibirsk Metro
- Line: Leninskaya Line
- Platforms: Island platform
- Tracks: 2

Construction
- Structure type: Underground

History
- Opened: April 2, 1992

Services
Preceding station	Novosibirsk Metro	Following station
Terminus	Leninskaya Line	Gagarinskaya towards Ploshchad Marksa
Location

Zayeltsovskaya (Russian: Заельцо́вская) is a station on the Leninskaya Line of the Novosibirsk Metro. It opened on April 2, 1992.
