= Leninsky District, Novosibirsk =

Leninsky District
- District
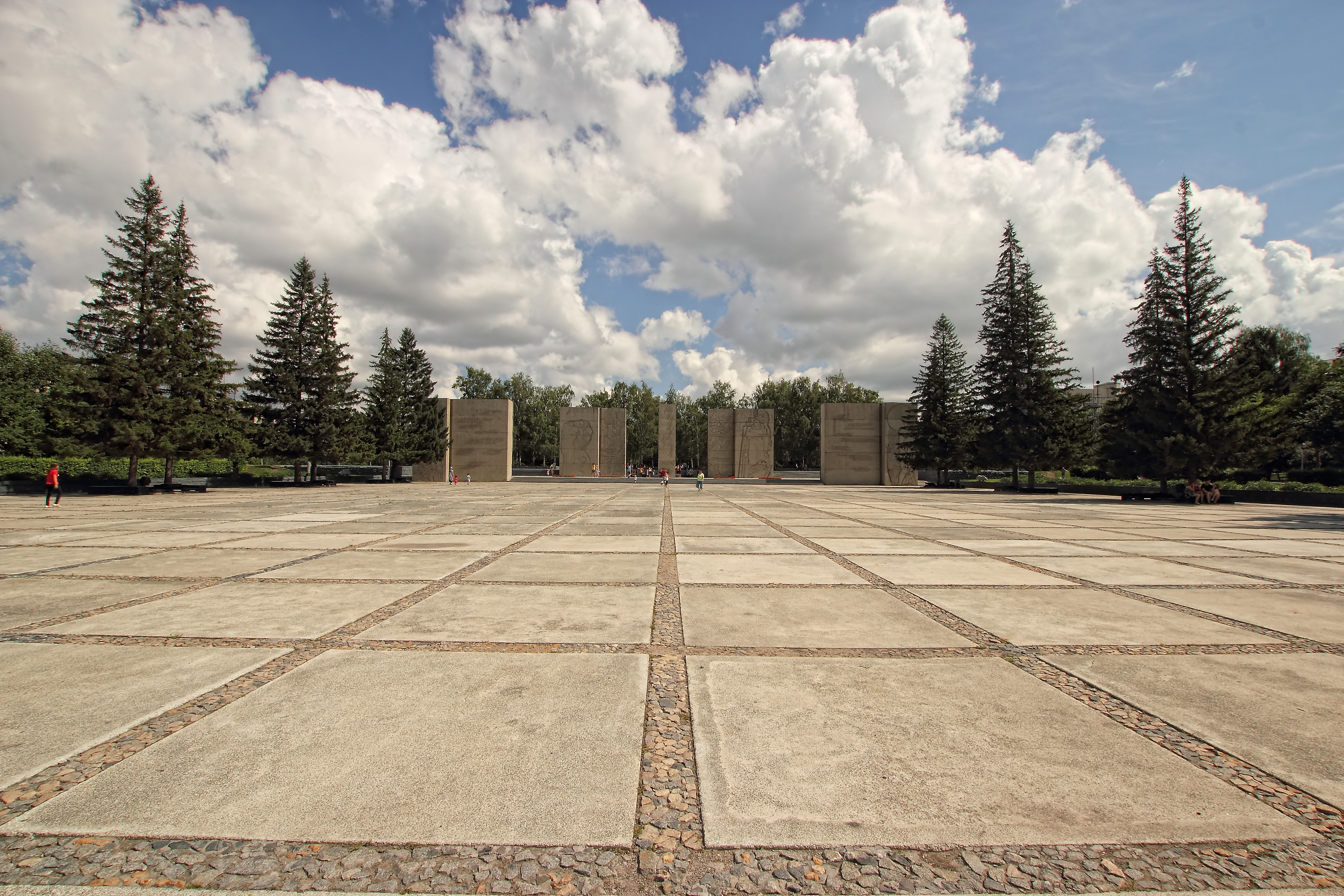
- Monument of Glory
- Location of Leninsky City District
- Coordinates: 55°00′N 82°54′E
- Country: Russia
- Federal subject: Novosibirsk

Area
  - Total: 76.12 km^{2} (29.39 sq mi)

Leninsky City District is an administrative district (raion), one of the 10 raions of Novosibirsk, Russia. It is located on the left bank of the Ob river. The area of the district is 76.12 square kilometres (29.39 sq mi). Population: 302,803 (2018 Census). It is the most populous district of the city. The main historical landmark of the district is the Monument of Glory, a monument to Siberians who participated in the Great Patriotic War of 1941-1945, opened on November 6, 1967 between Plakhotny and Parkhomenko Streets (authored by muralist A. Chernobrovtsev (1930-2014)). Sculptor B. Ermishin, architects M. Pirogov and B. Zakharov also participated in the creation of the monument. The memorial occupies almost 2 hectares and consists of a symbolic statue of a grieving mother woman, an Eternal Flame and seven powerful ten-meter pylons on which scenes depicting individual stages of the war are engraved. On the opposite side, the names of 30266 Novosibirsk residents who fell at the front are pressed into the concrete of the pylons. The nameplates are made of metal. Between the pylons on the elevation there are 4 urns with earth from the places of bloody battles. Behind the memorial is the Walk of Fame, where there are one hundred fir trees planted in honor of Novosibirsk Heroes of the Soviet Union. The life and work of two honorary residents of the city are connected with the Leninsky district: A.I. Pokryshkin, three times Hero of the Soviet Union, Air Marshal and G.P. Lyshinsky— professor, founder of the Novosibirsk Electrotechnical Institute (NSTU).

== History ==
The district was established on December 9, 1970.

== Streets ==
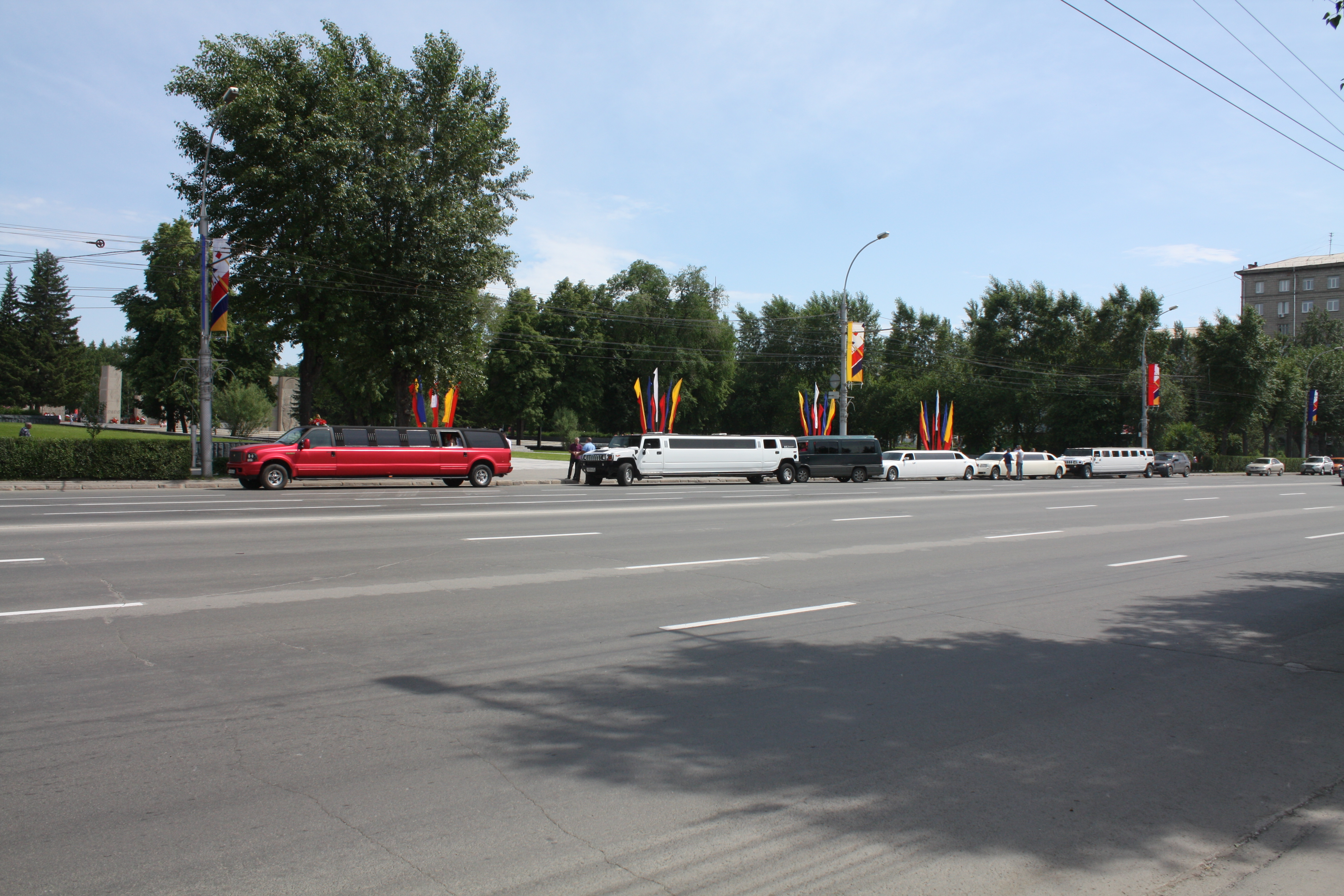
Stanislavsky Street

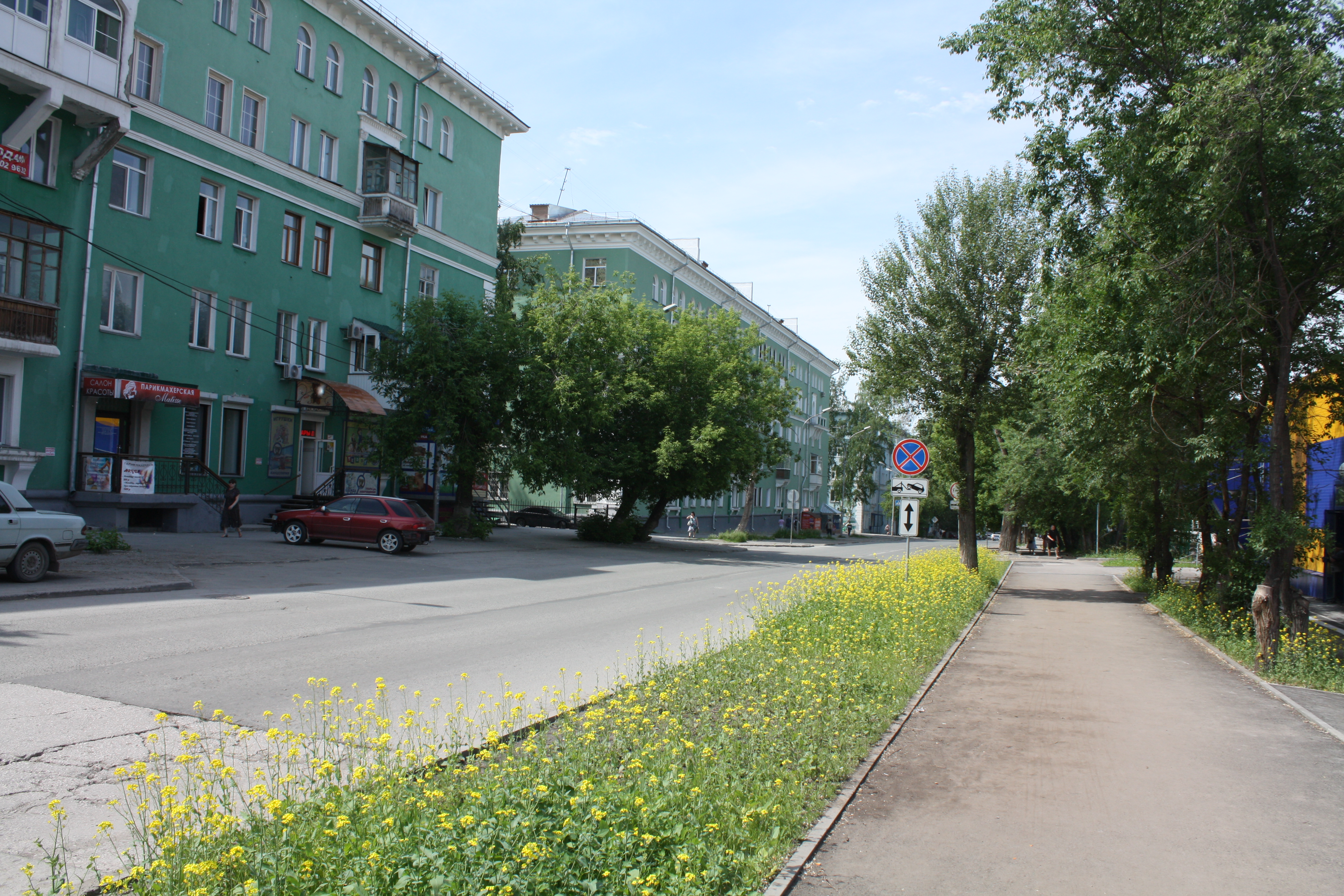
Kotovsky Street

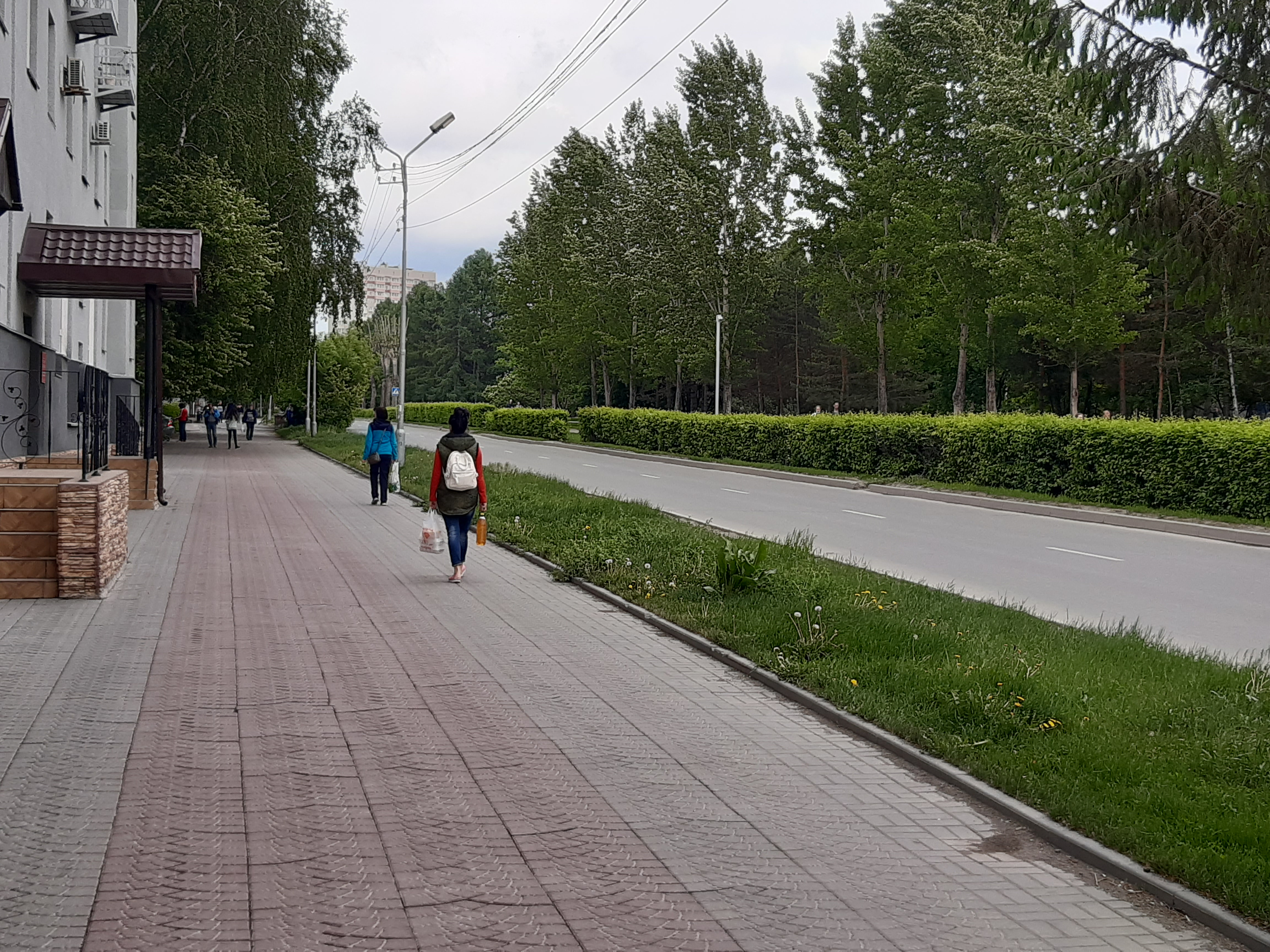
Parkhomenko Street

== Microdistricts ==
- Bashnya Microdistrict
- Gorsky Microdistrict
- Sad Kirova
- Stanislavsky Zhilmassiv
- Trolleyny Zhilmassiv
- Yugo-Zapadny Zhimassiv
- Yuzhny Microdistrict
- Zapadny Microdistrict
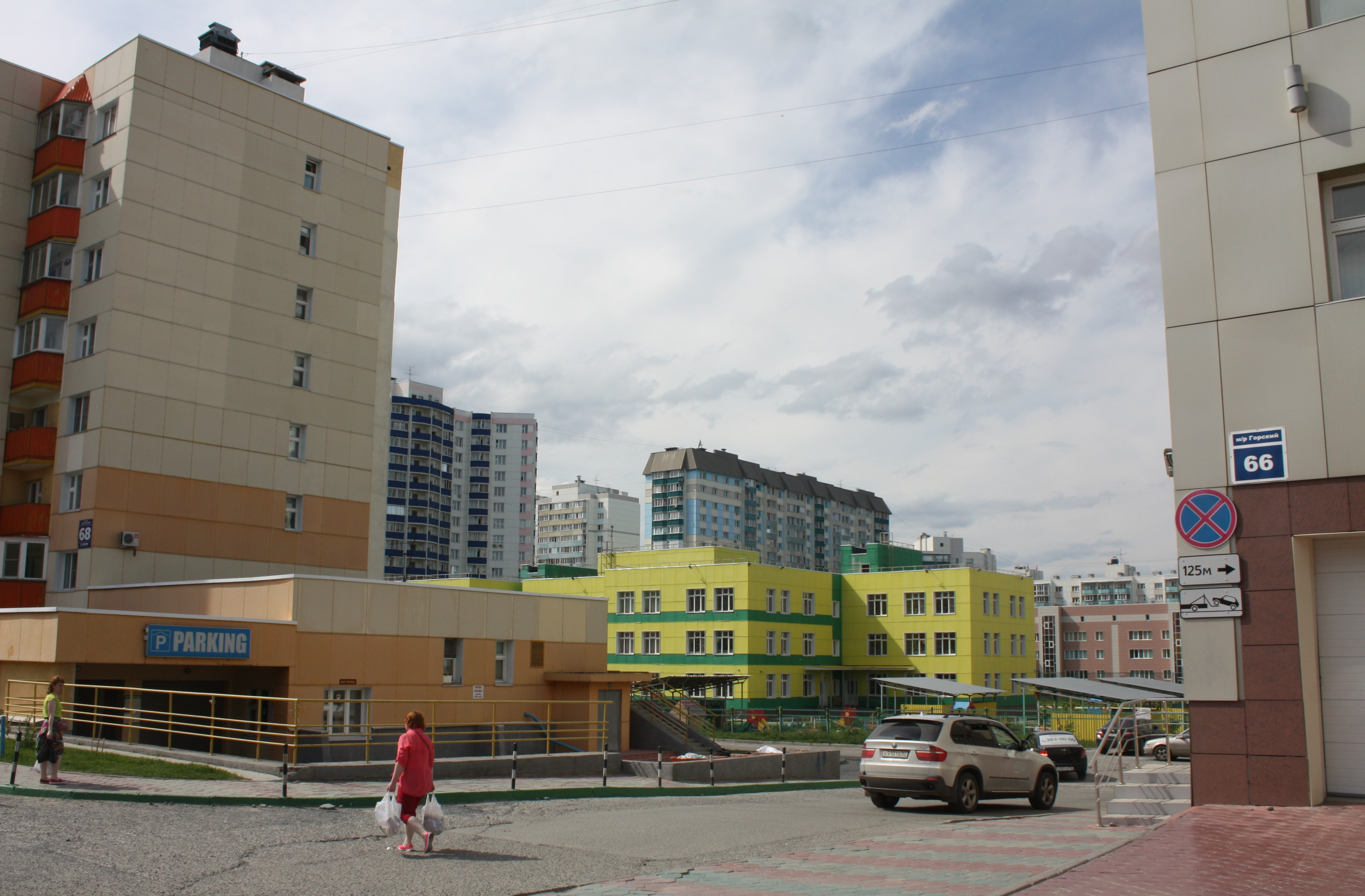
Gorsky Microdistrict

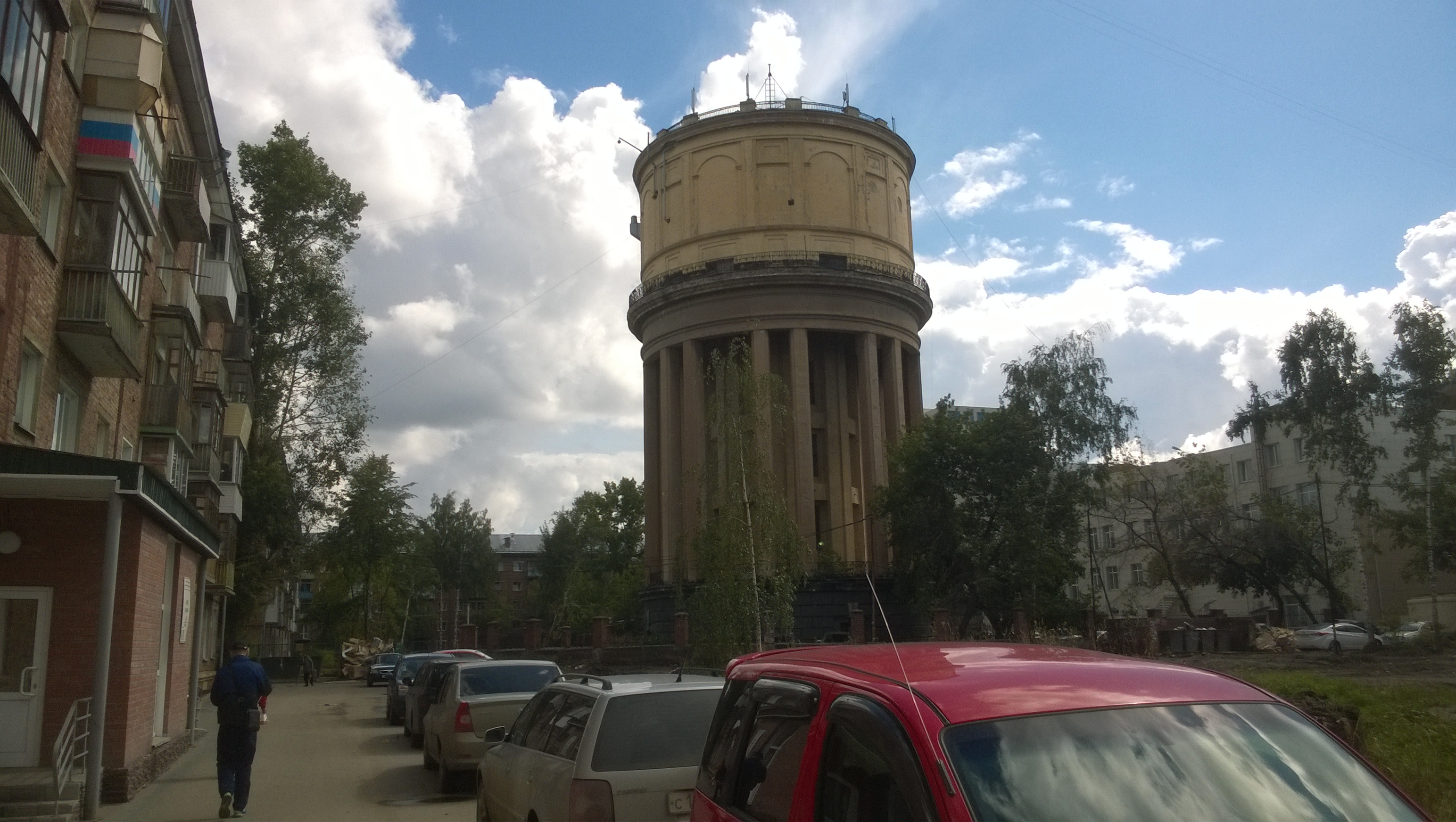
Bashnya Microdistrict

== Architecture ==
=== Soviet architecture ===
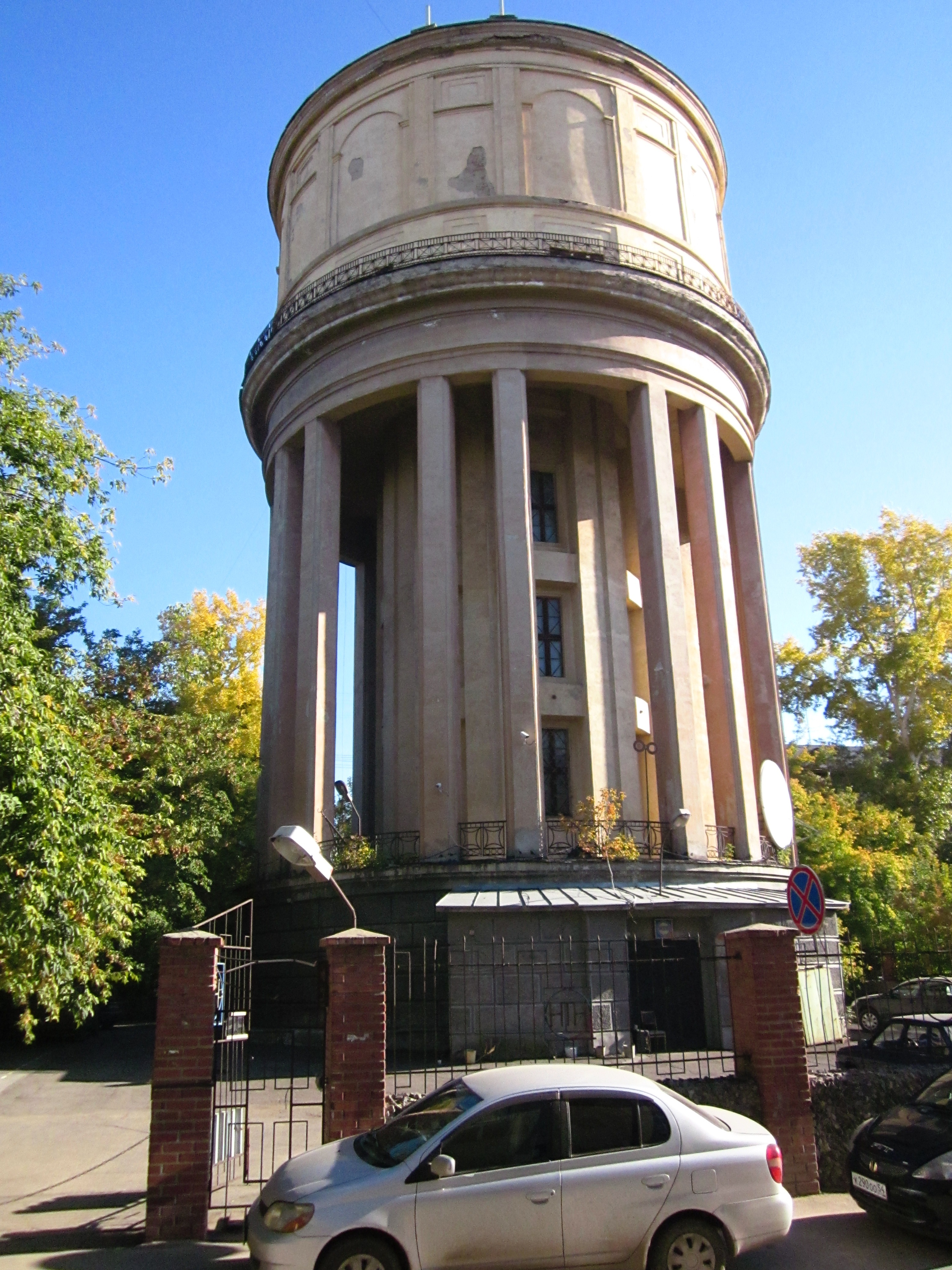
Karl Marx Square Water Tower, 1939

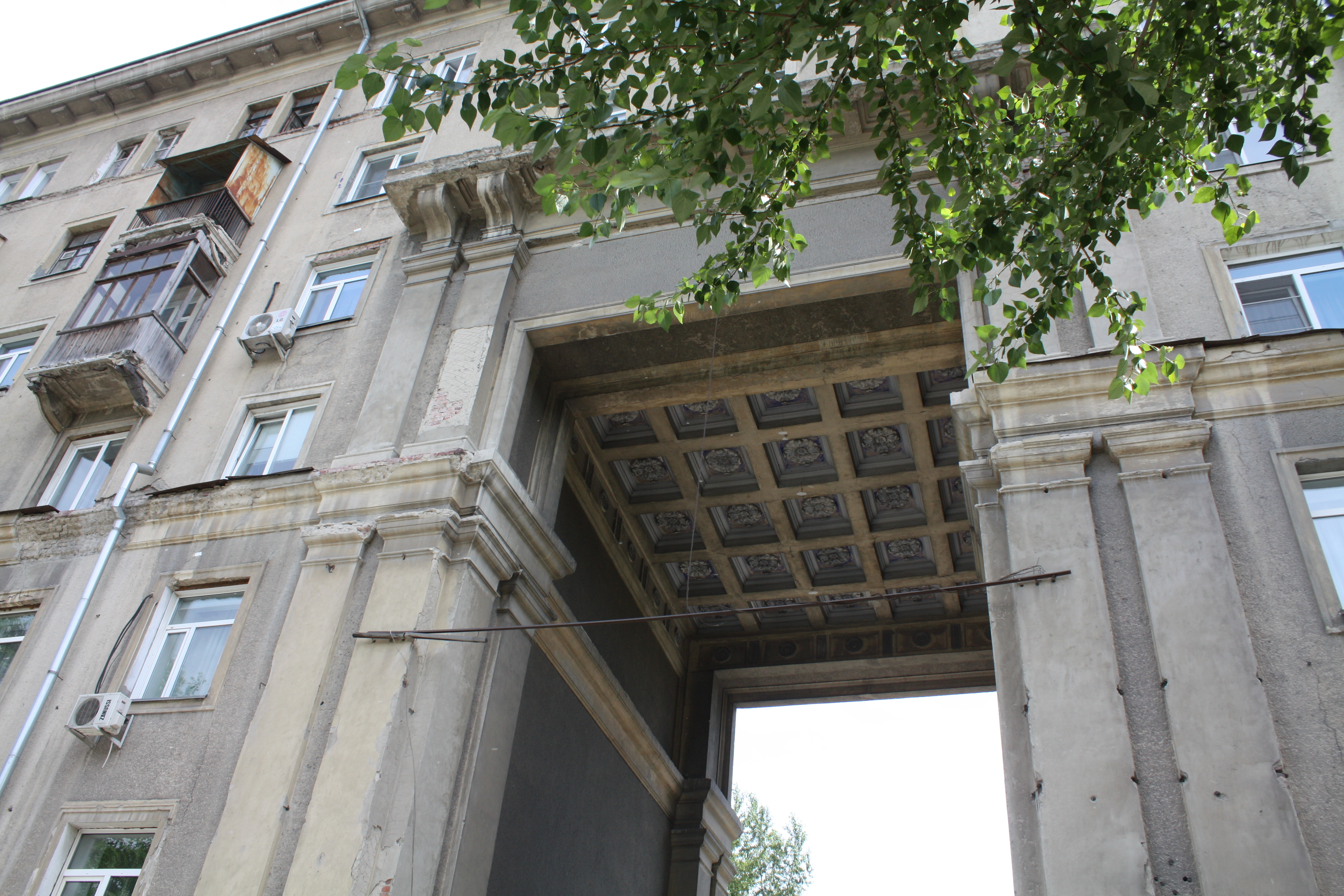
Stanislavsky Street 3, 1941

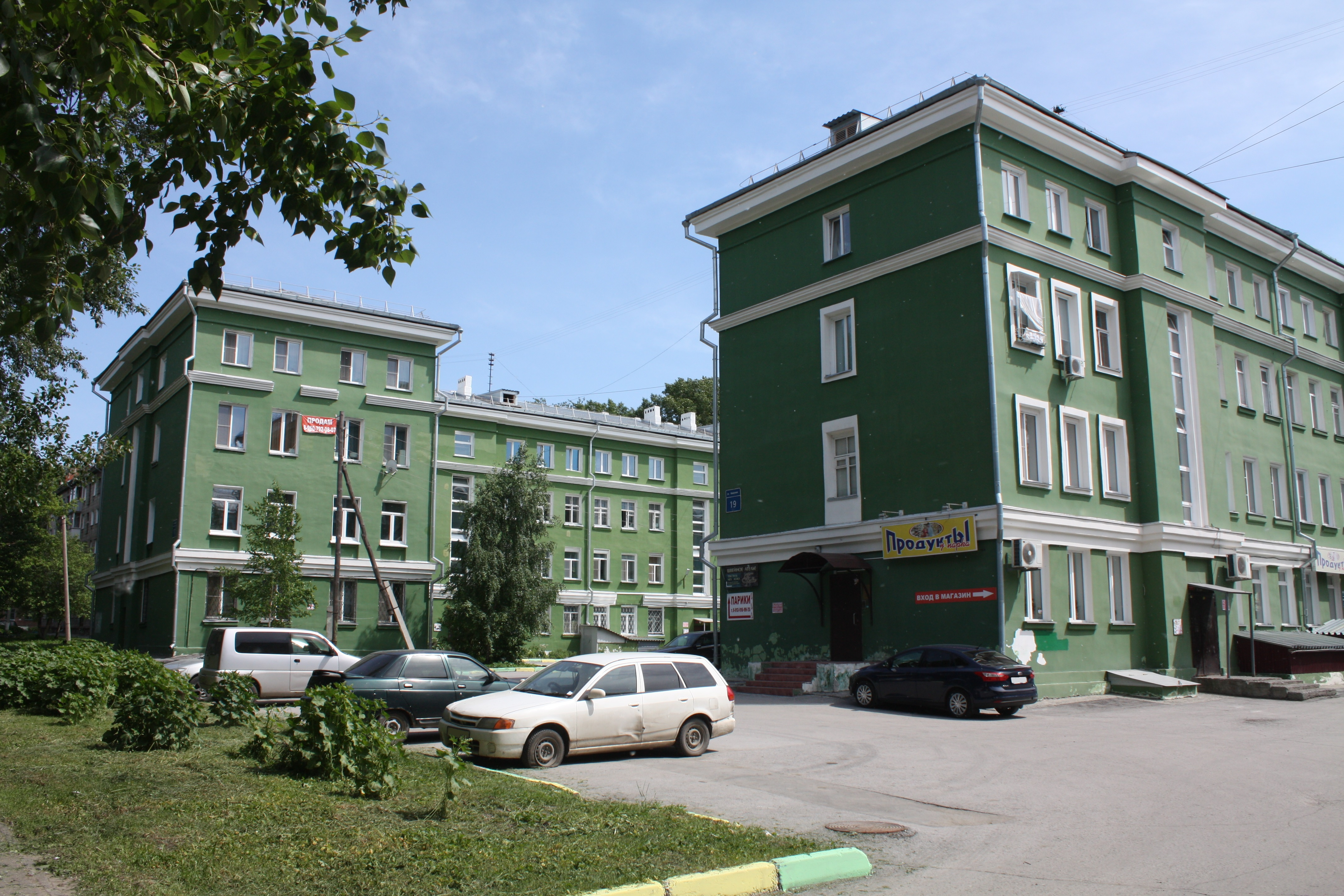
Buildings on Plakhotny Street

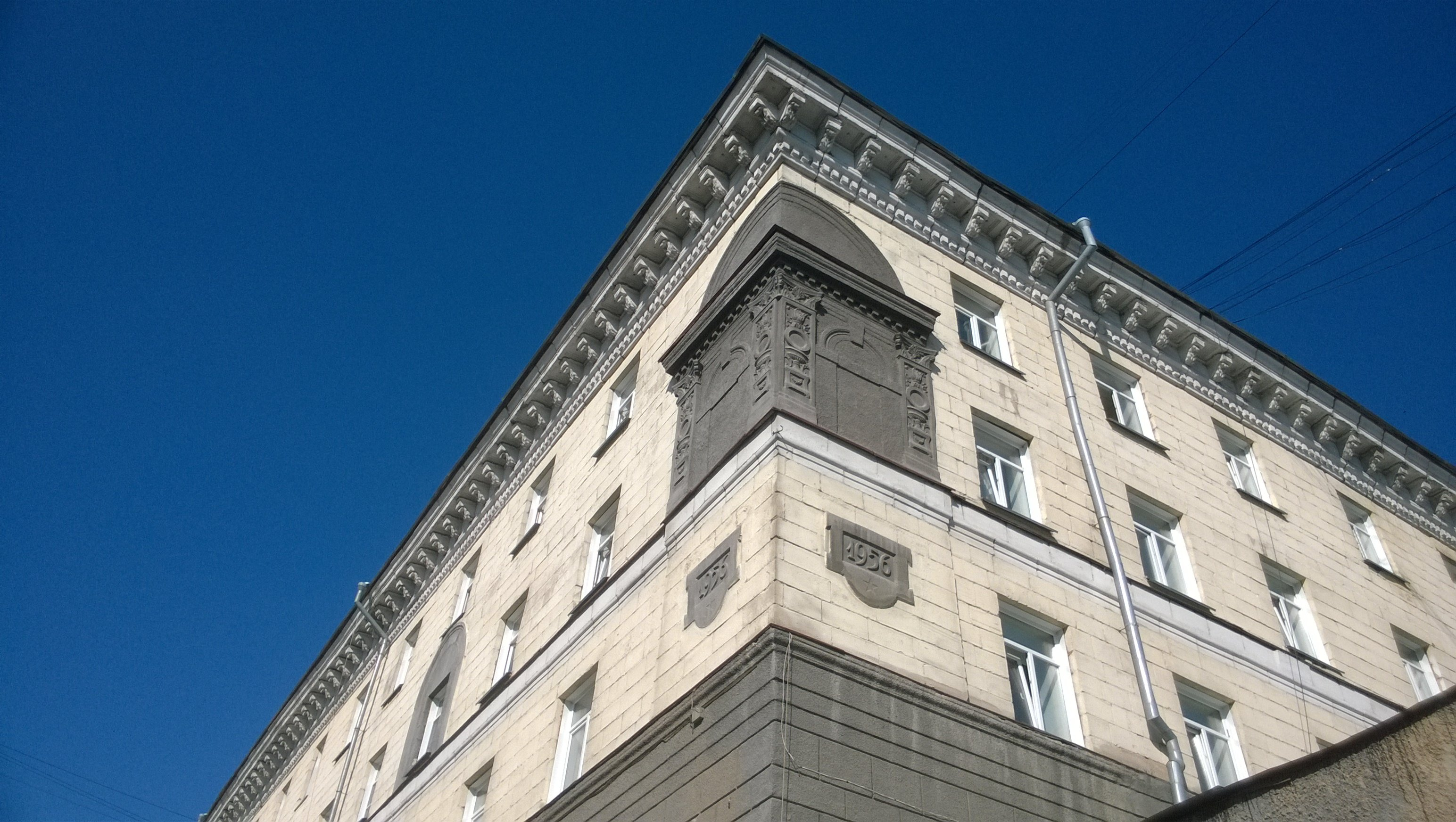

=== Post-Soviet architecture ===
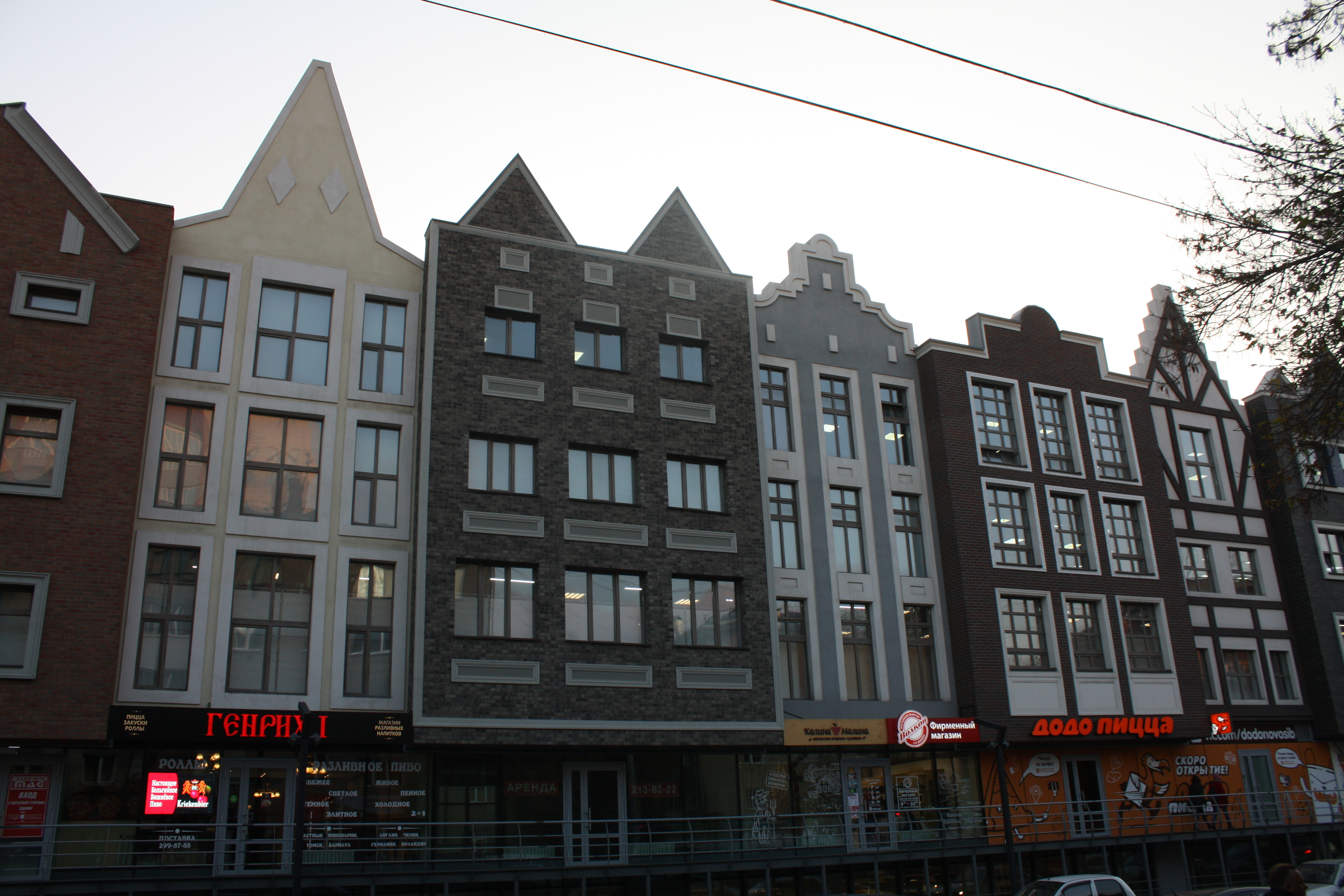
Amsterdam Shopping Centre, 2016

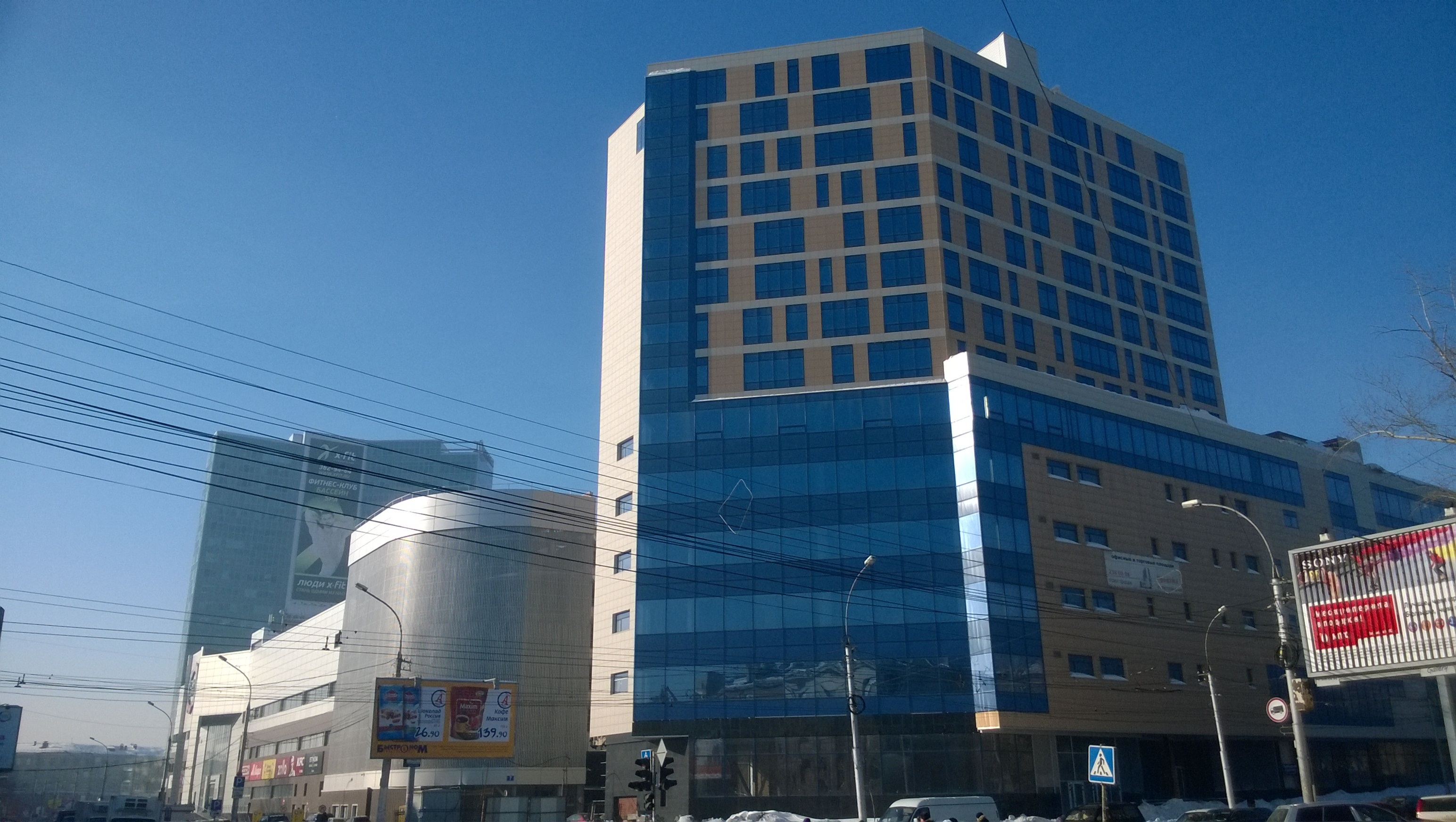
Buildings on Novogodnyaya Street

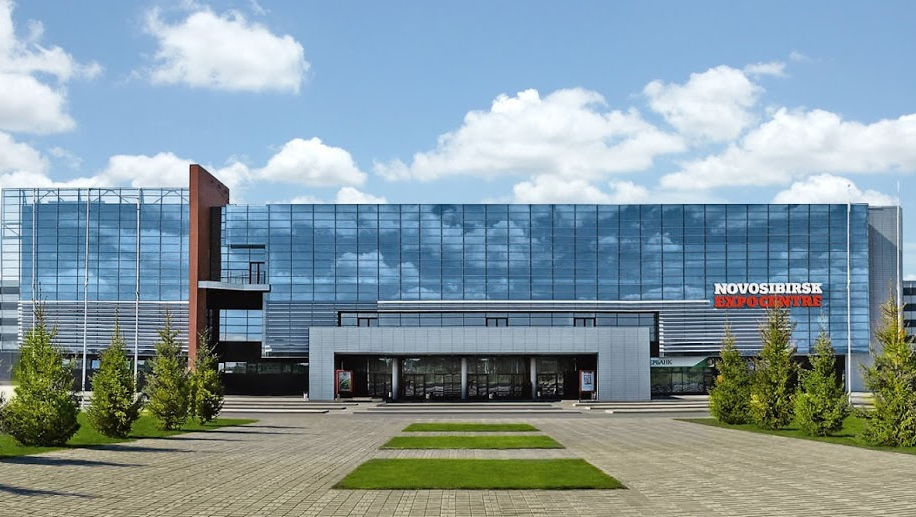
Novosibirsk Expocenter, 2012

== Education ==
- Novosibirsk State Technical University is a big research and educational center. It was established in 1950.
- Siberian State University of Geosystems and Technologies is an educational center established in 1933.
- Siberian University of Consumer Cooperation is a university founded in 1956.
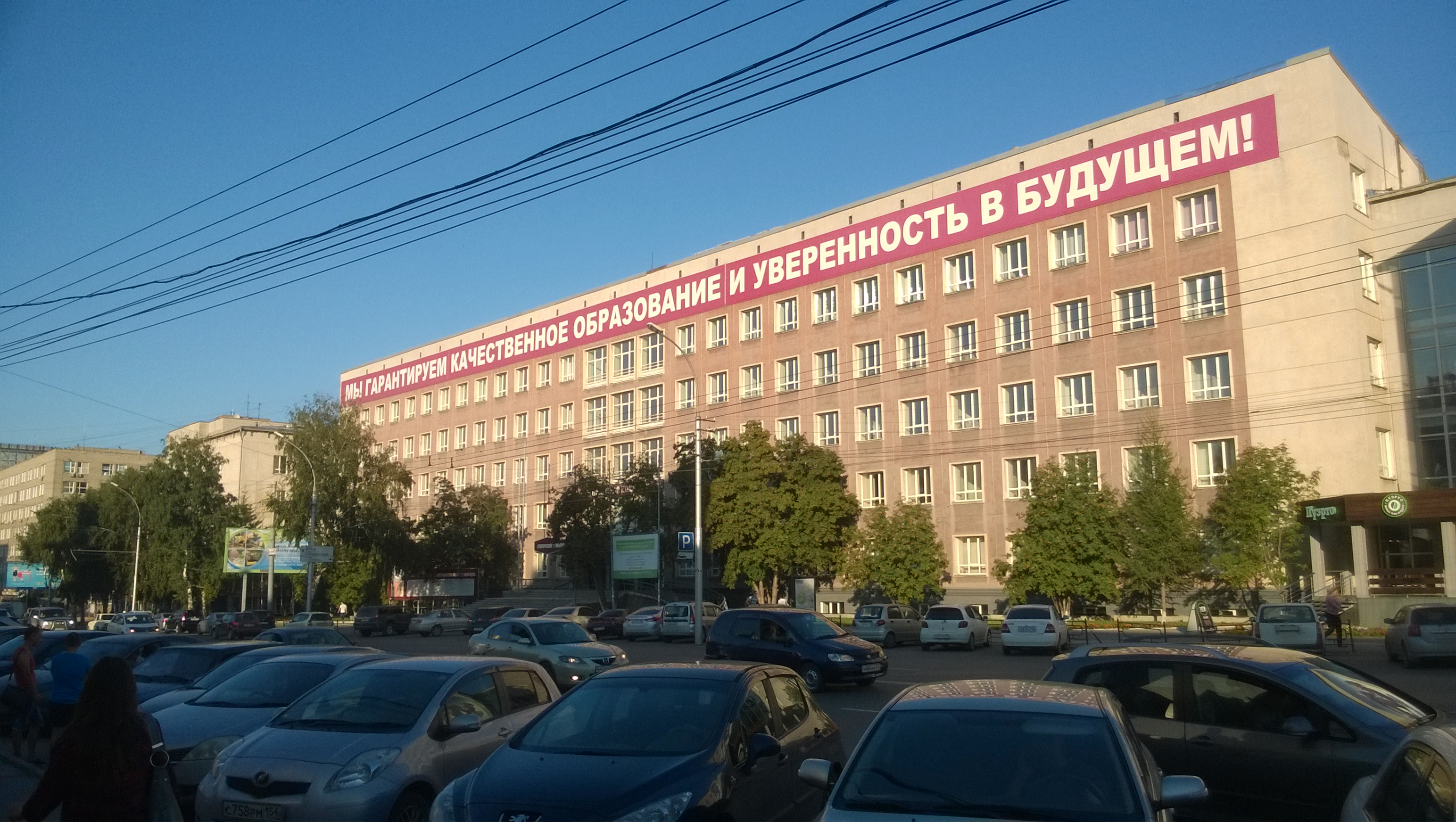
Siberian University of Consumer Cooperation

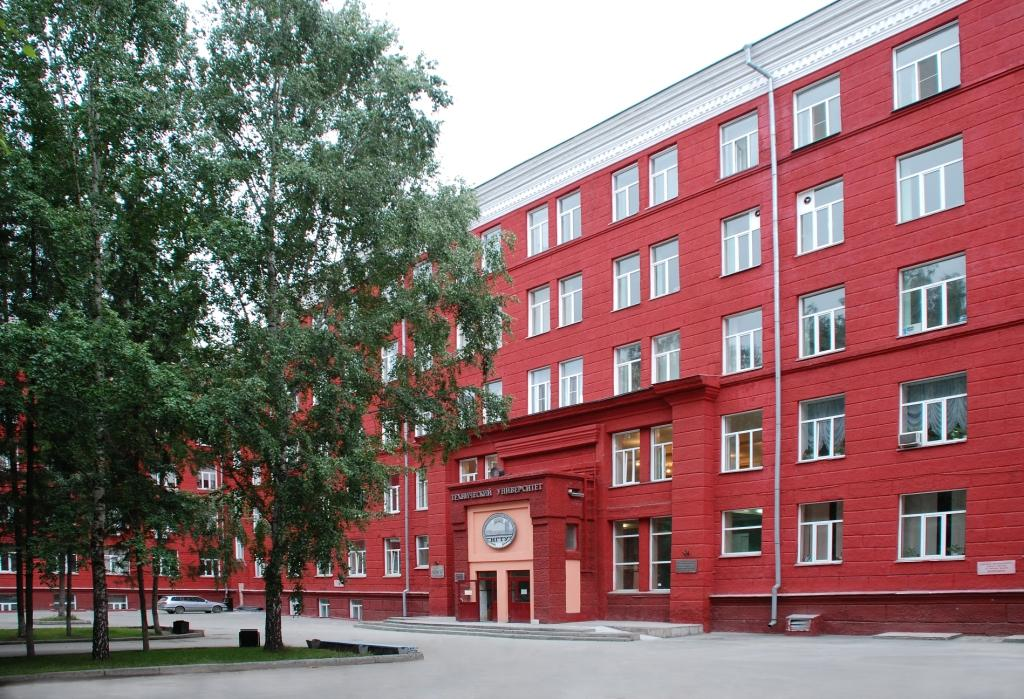
Novosibirsk State Technical University

== Memorials ==
=== Monument of Glory ===
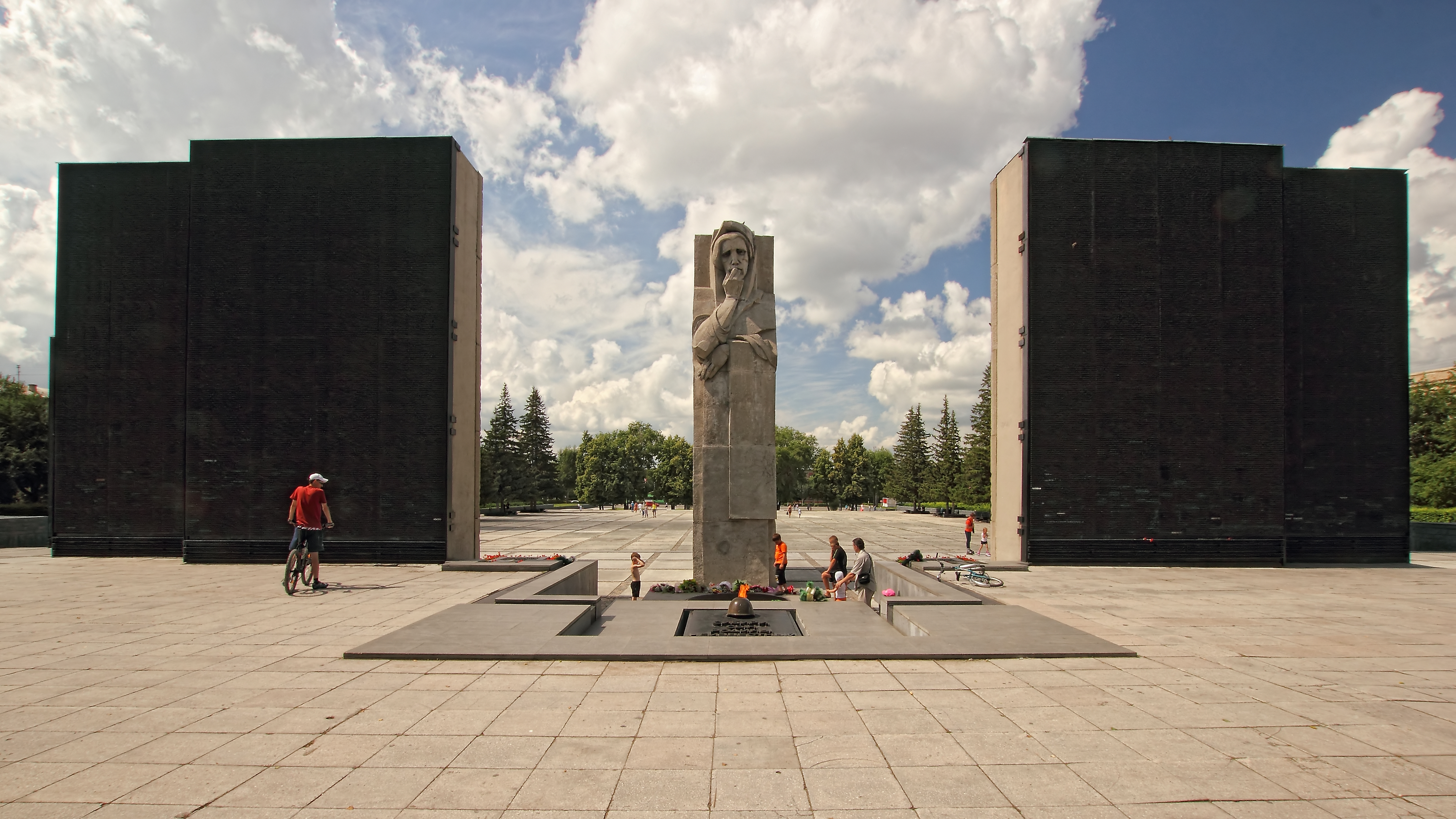

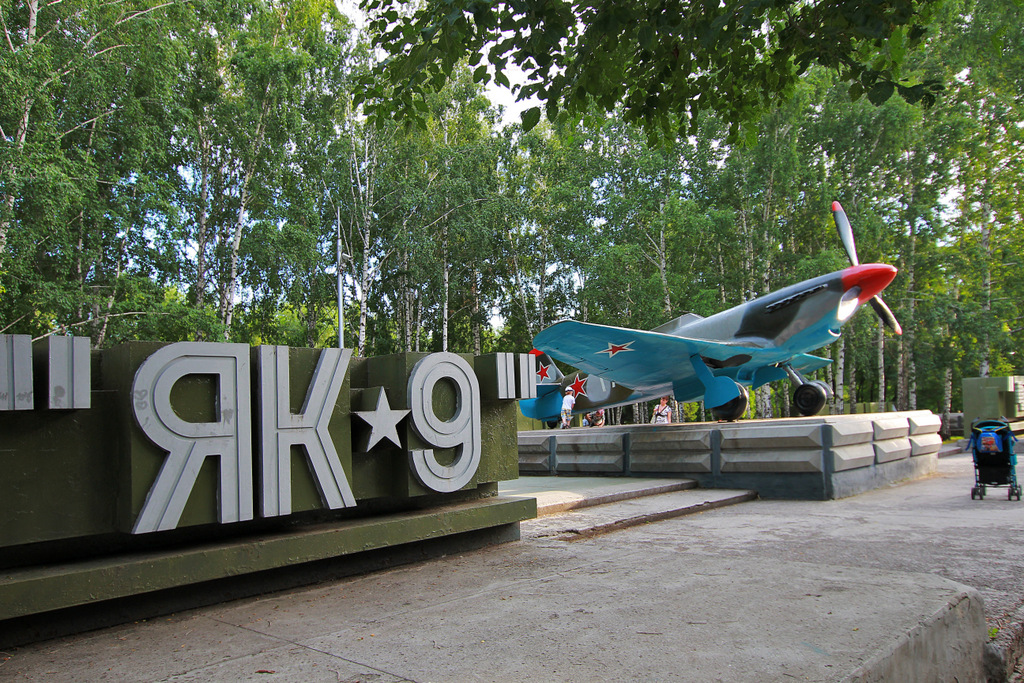

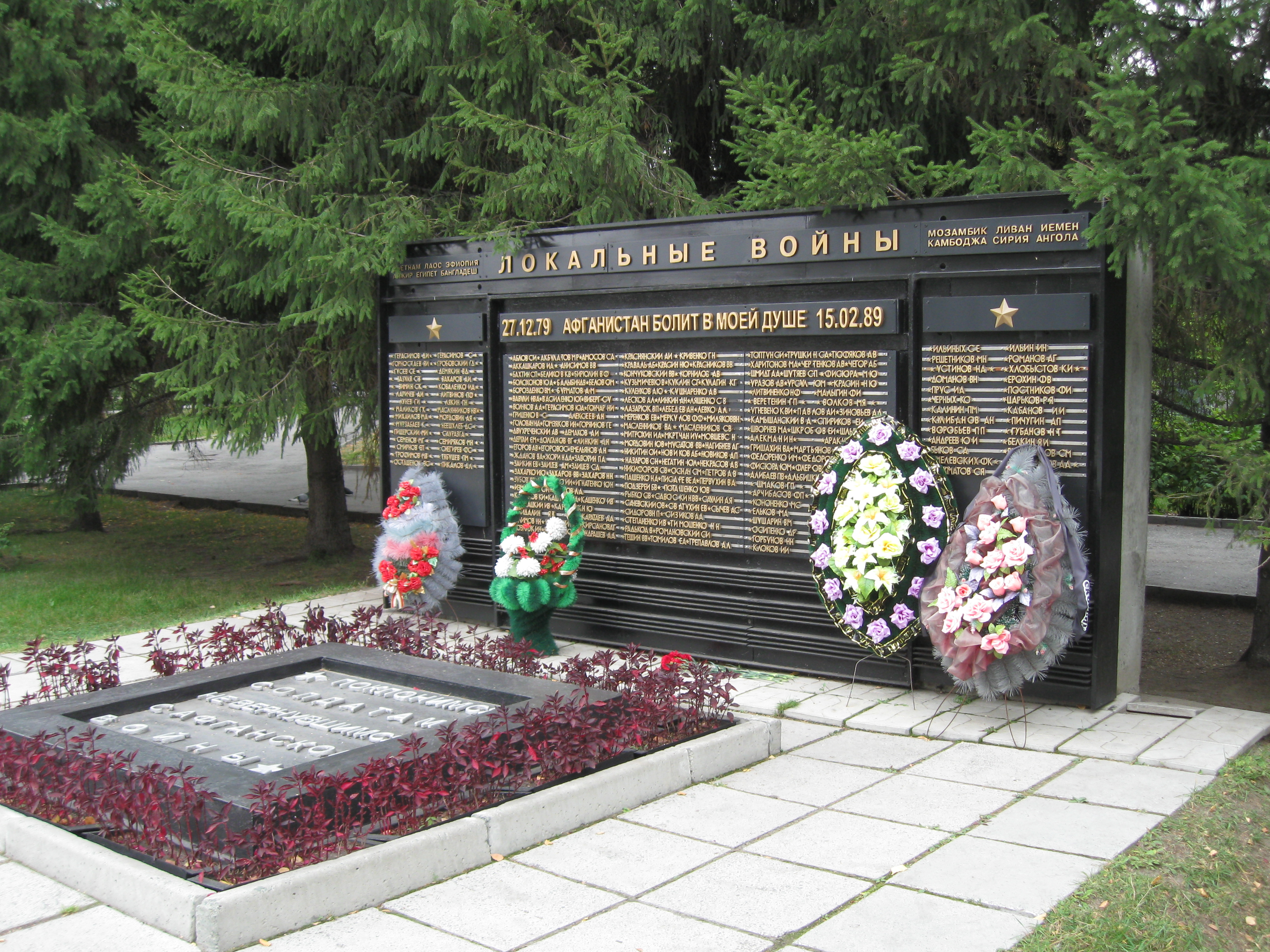

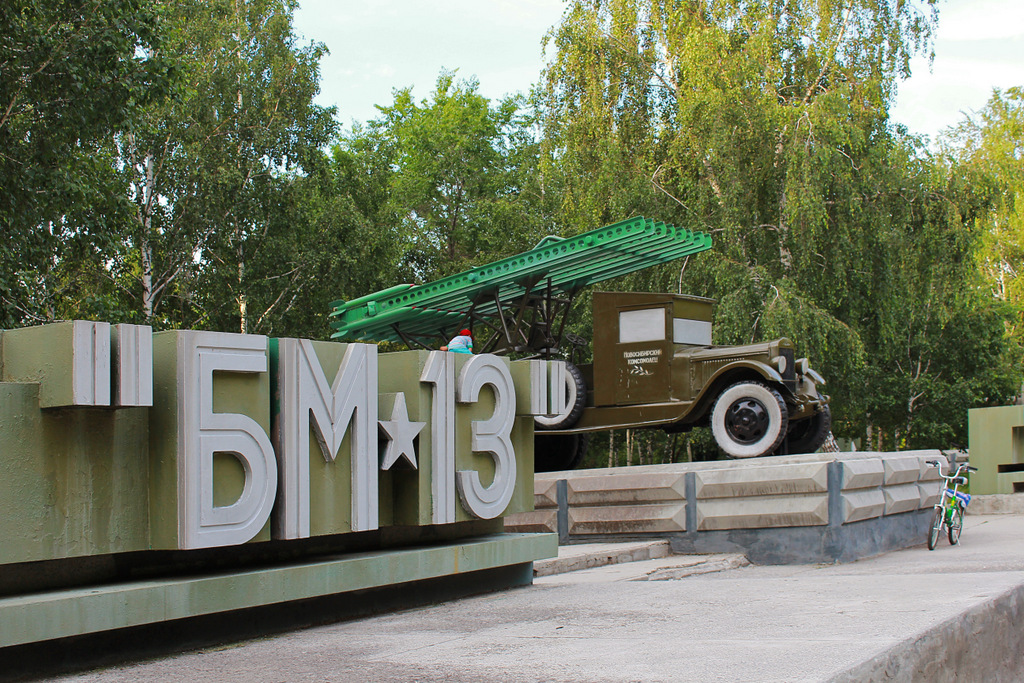

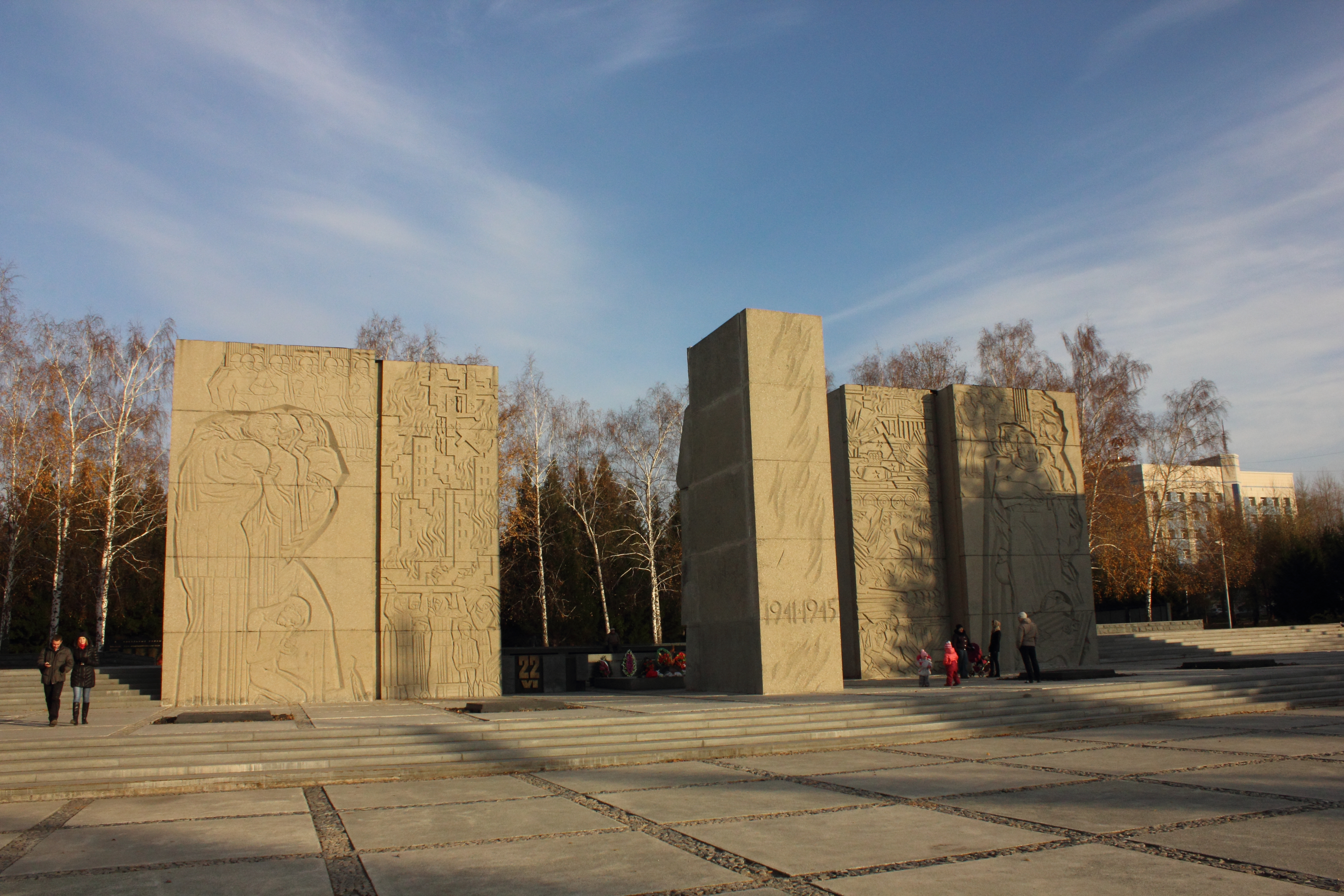

== Parks ==
- Gagarin Square
- Kirov Park
- Square of Glory
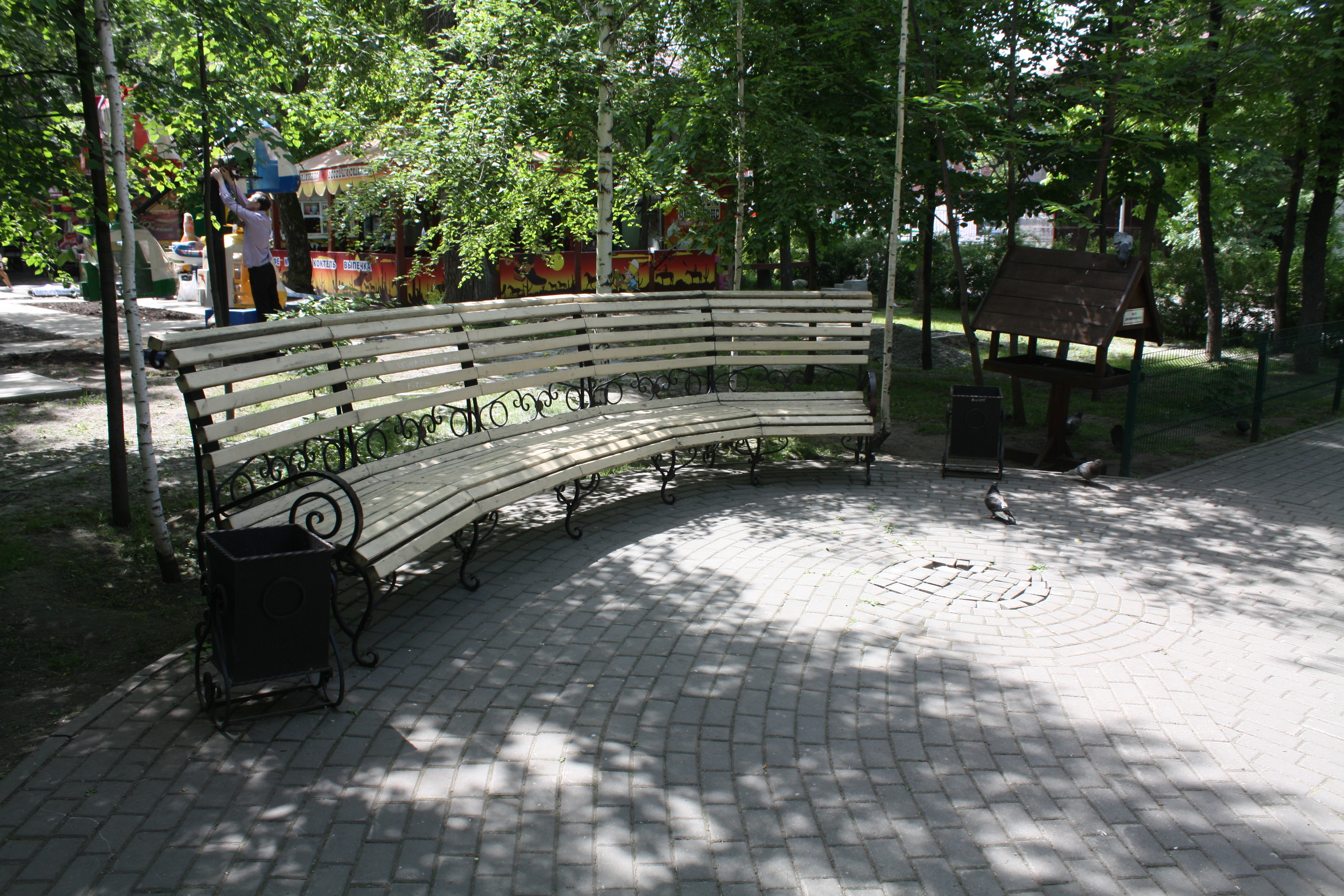
Kirov Park

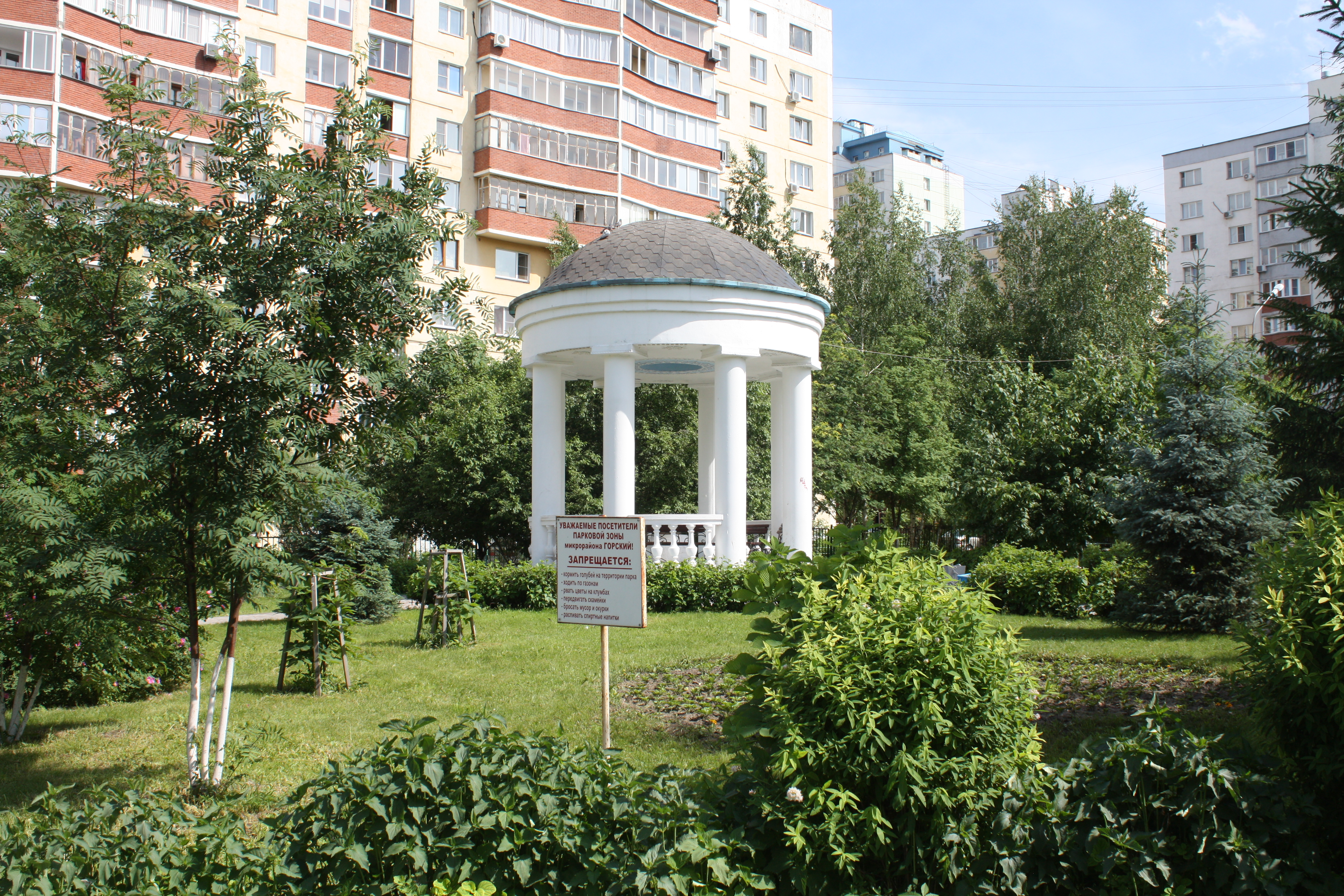
Park Zone, Gorsky Microdistrict

== Culture ==
=== Media ===
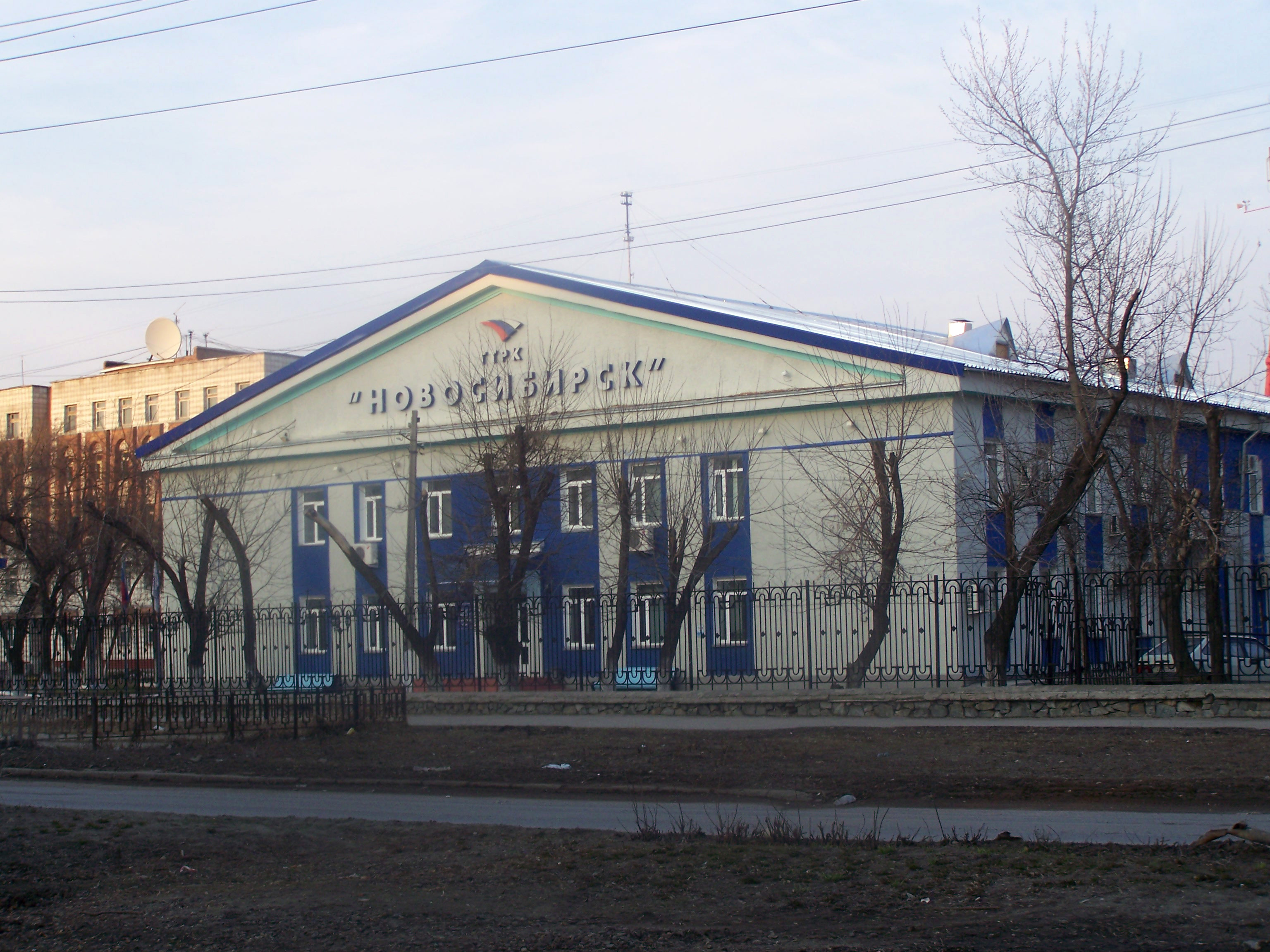
GTRK "Novosibirsk"

=== Food ===
Novosibirsk shares culture with modern russian cuisine. It does not have distinct and territorial meals. The city is home to over 5000 restaurants The first McDonalds (now Вкусно и Точка) opened in the city in 2014, in the "Aura" mall. The Pyshechnaya is a cafe on Stanislvsky Street. It was opened in the mid-twentieth century. Soviet interior has been preserved in the cafe (mosaic walls, chandeliers and front sign).

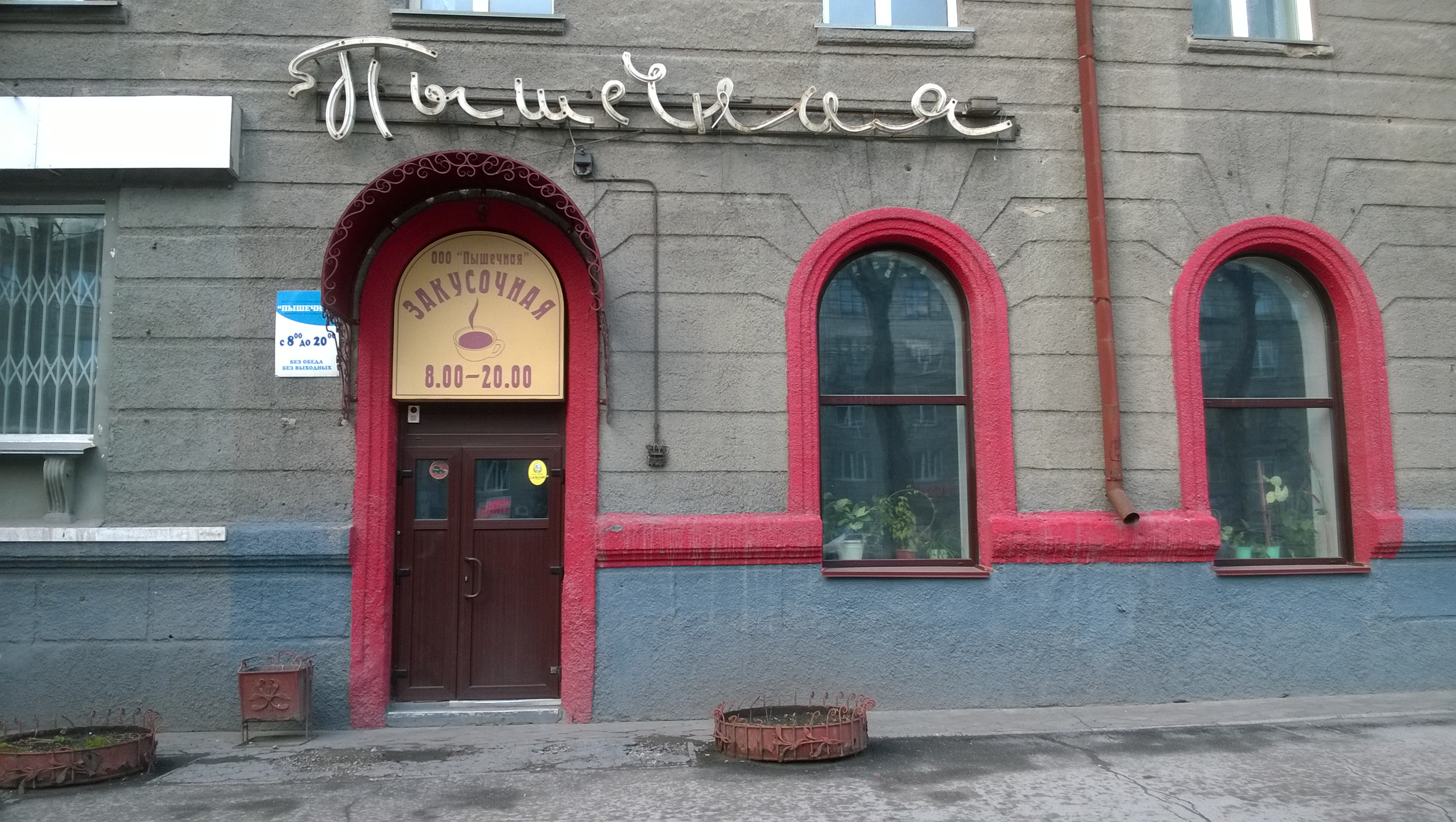

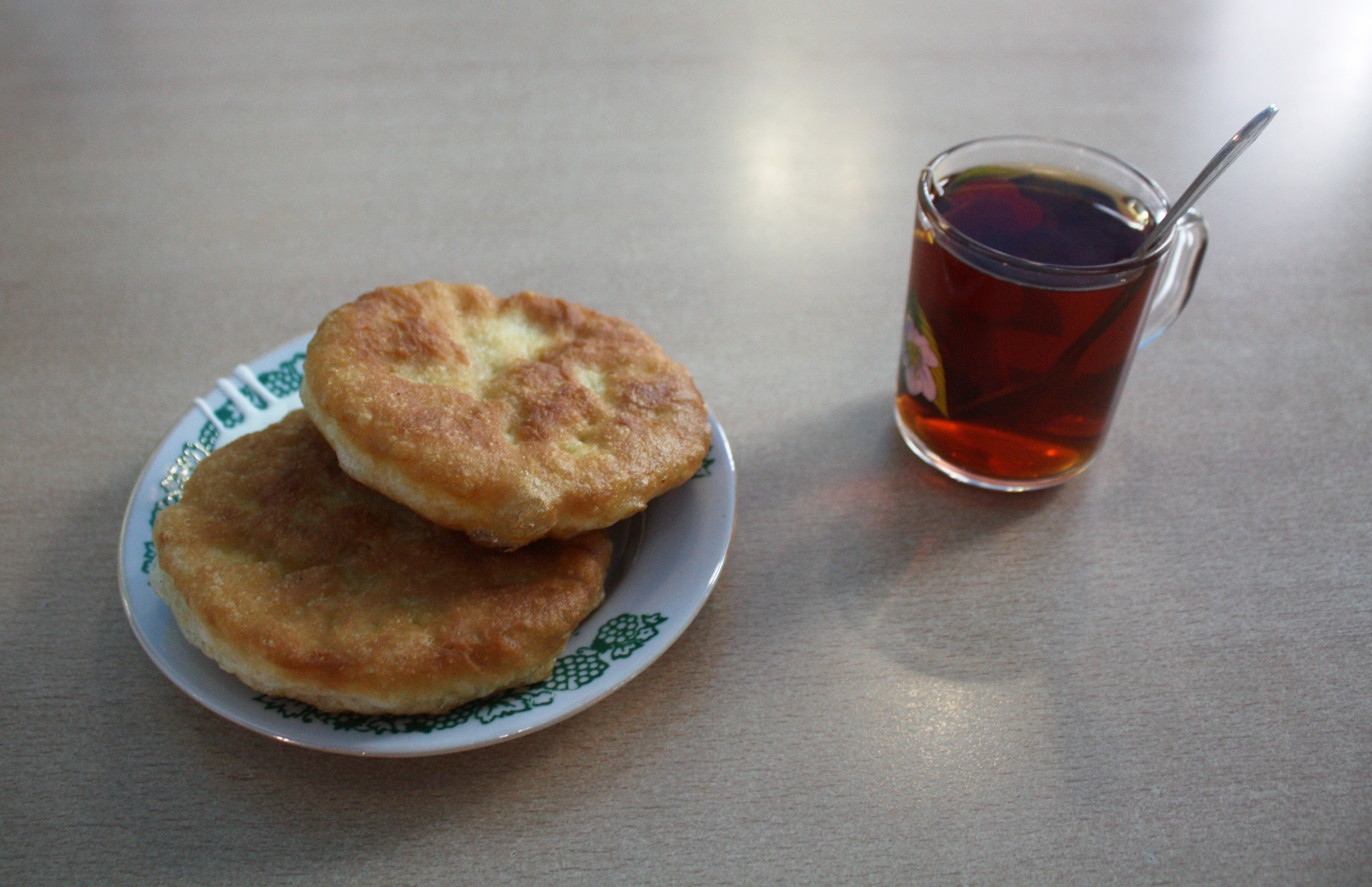

== Sports ==
- Junior Children's Football School
- Sibselmash is a bandy club founded in 1937, subsequently reestablished in 1974.
- Novosibirsk Hippodrome
- Ob Sports Complex
- Penguin Curling Club is a curling center, opened in 2015.
- Zarya Sports Training Center
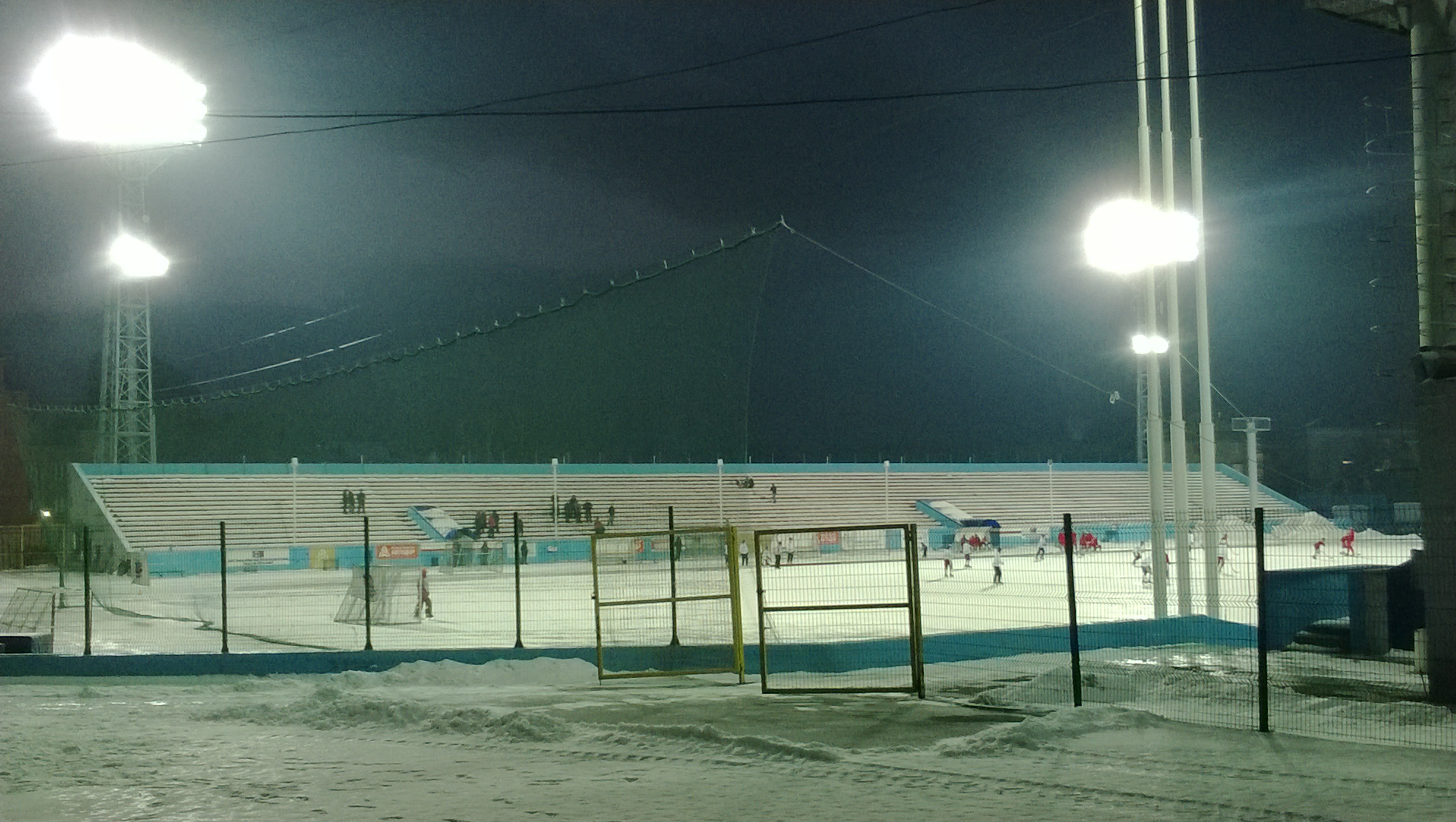
Sibselmash Stadium

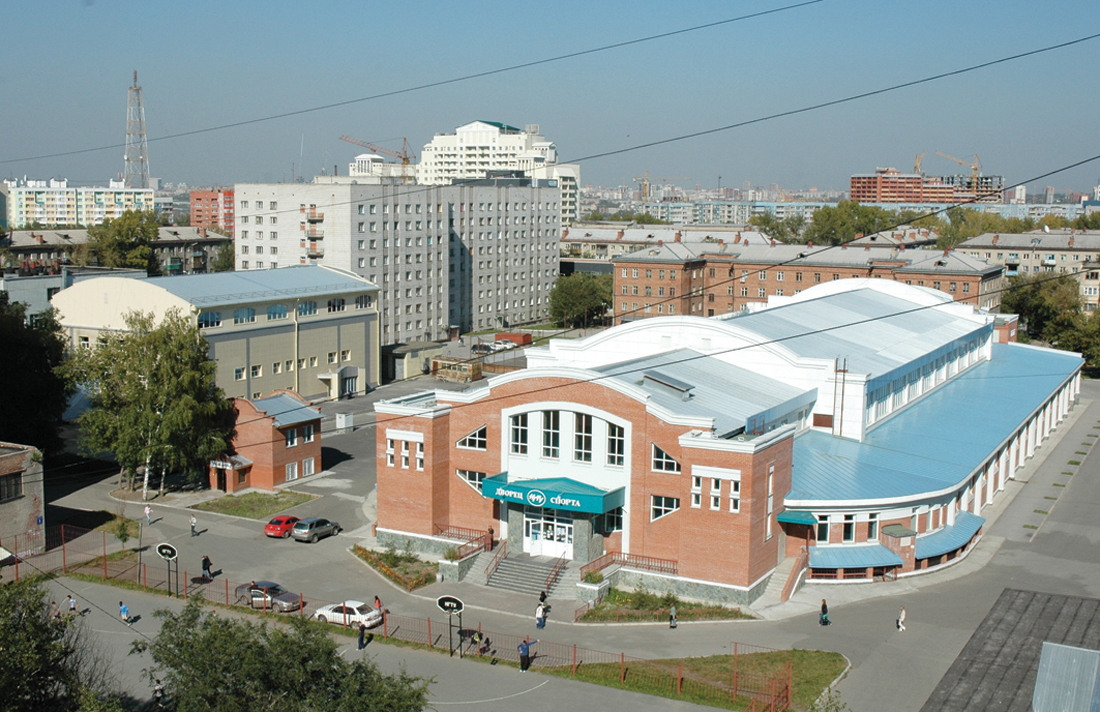
Palace of Sports of NSTU

== Economy ==
=== Companies ===
- 2GIS is a technology company that develops digital guides and maps of cities in Russia, Kazakhstan, Italy, Czech Republic, Chile, UAE, Kyrgyzstan, Cyprus and Ukraine.
- Novosibirsk Cartridge Plant is a plant that produces battle, hunting, service, sports and traumatic cartridges.
- Novosibirsk Plant of Metal Structures
- NPM Group is a producer of equipment for fast foam-free dispensing of foamy beverages (beer and others) and milk vending machines.
- Sibselmash Company

=== Thermal power plants ===
- Novosibirsk Thermal Power Plant 2
- Novosibirsk Thermal Power Plant 3

== Transportation ==
=== Railway ===
Five railway stations are located in the district: Levaya Ob, Zhilmasiv, Novosibirsk-Zapadny, Ippodrom and Kleshchikha.

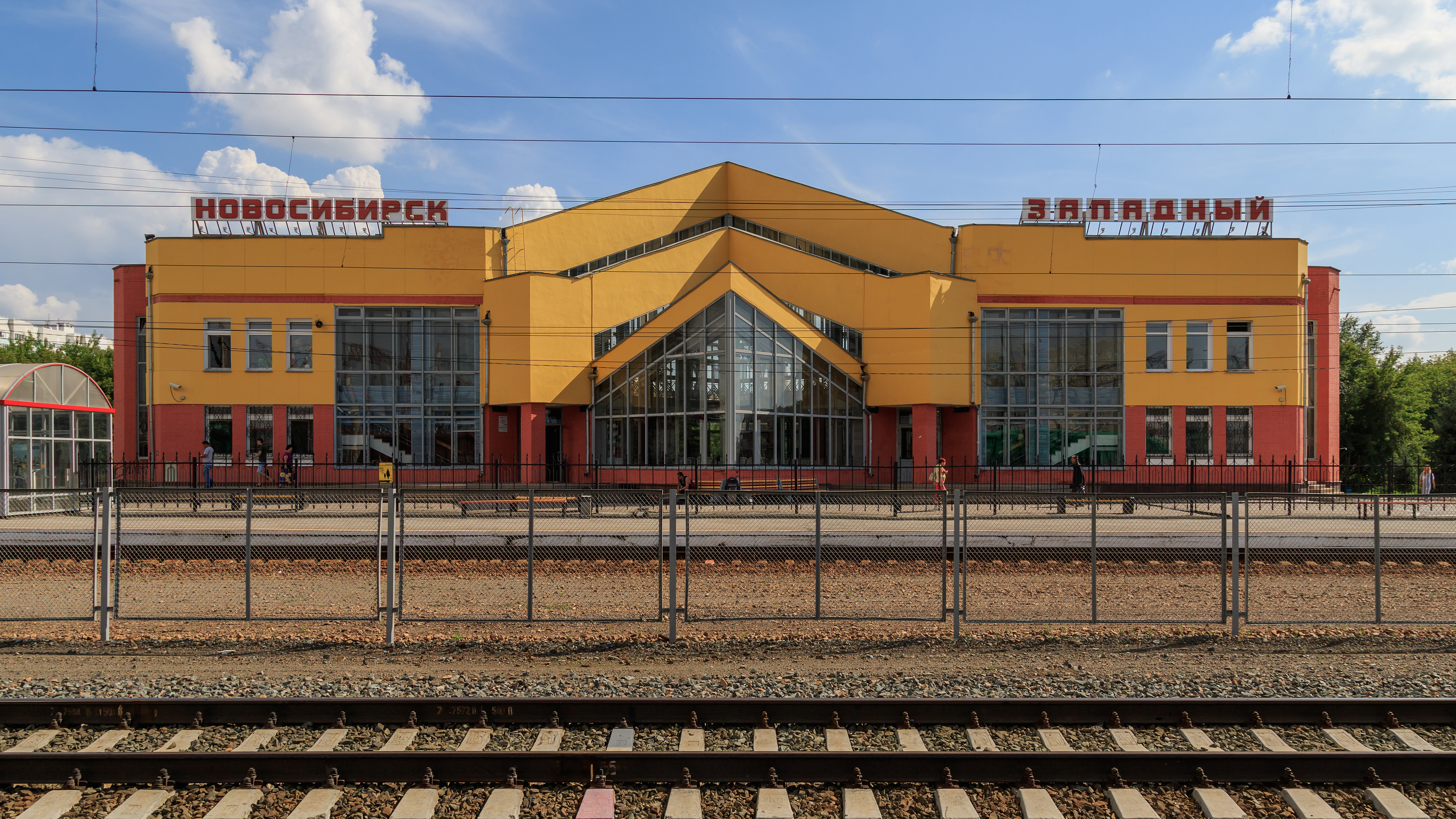
Novosibirsk-Zapadny

=== Metro ===
Two Novosibirsk Metro stations are located in the district: Ploshchad Marksa and Studencheskaya.

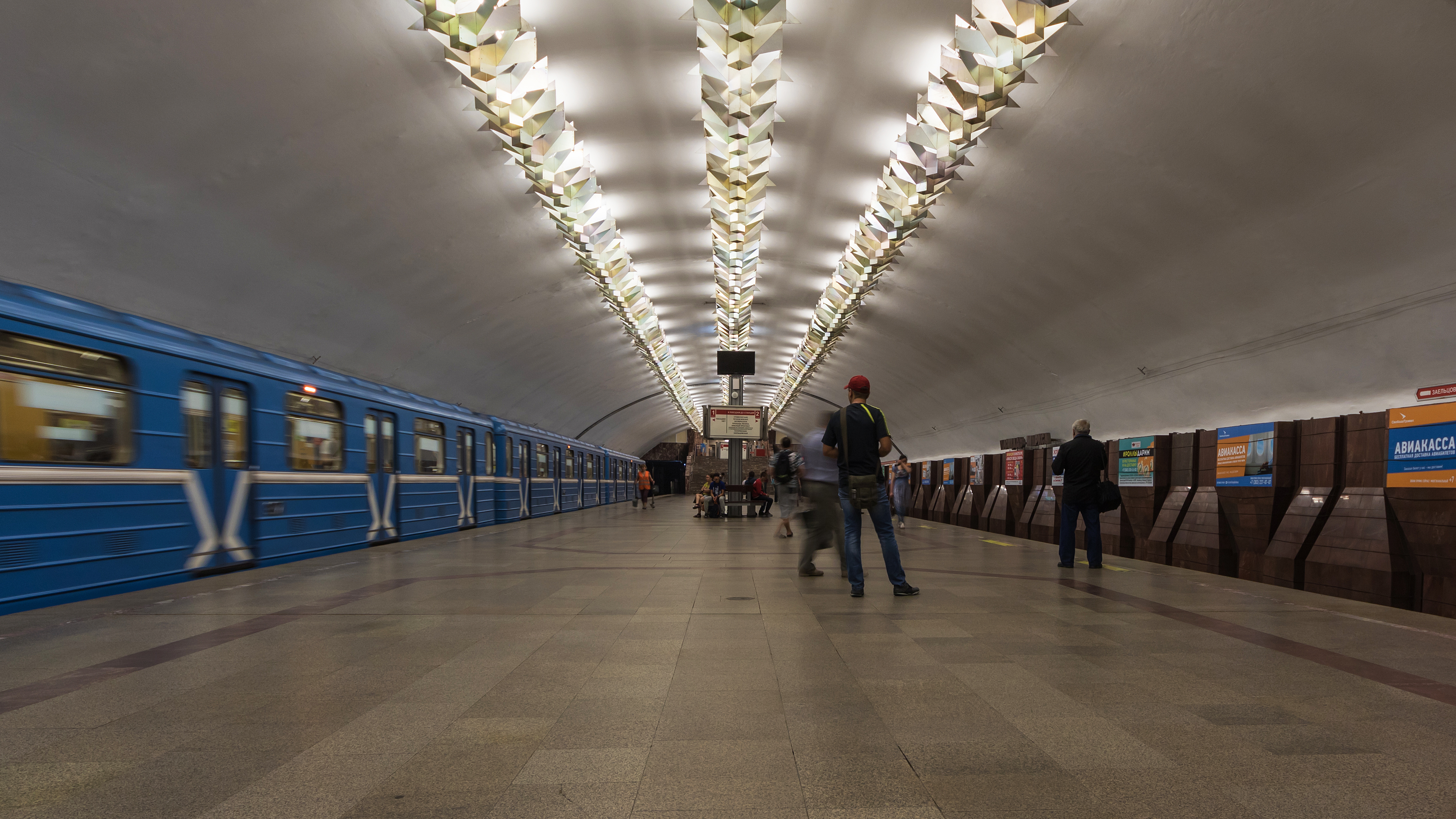
Ploshchad Marksa

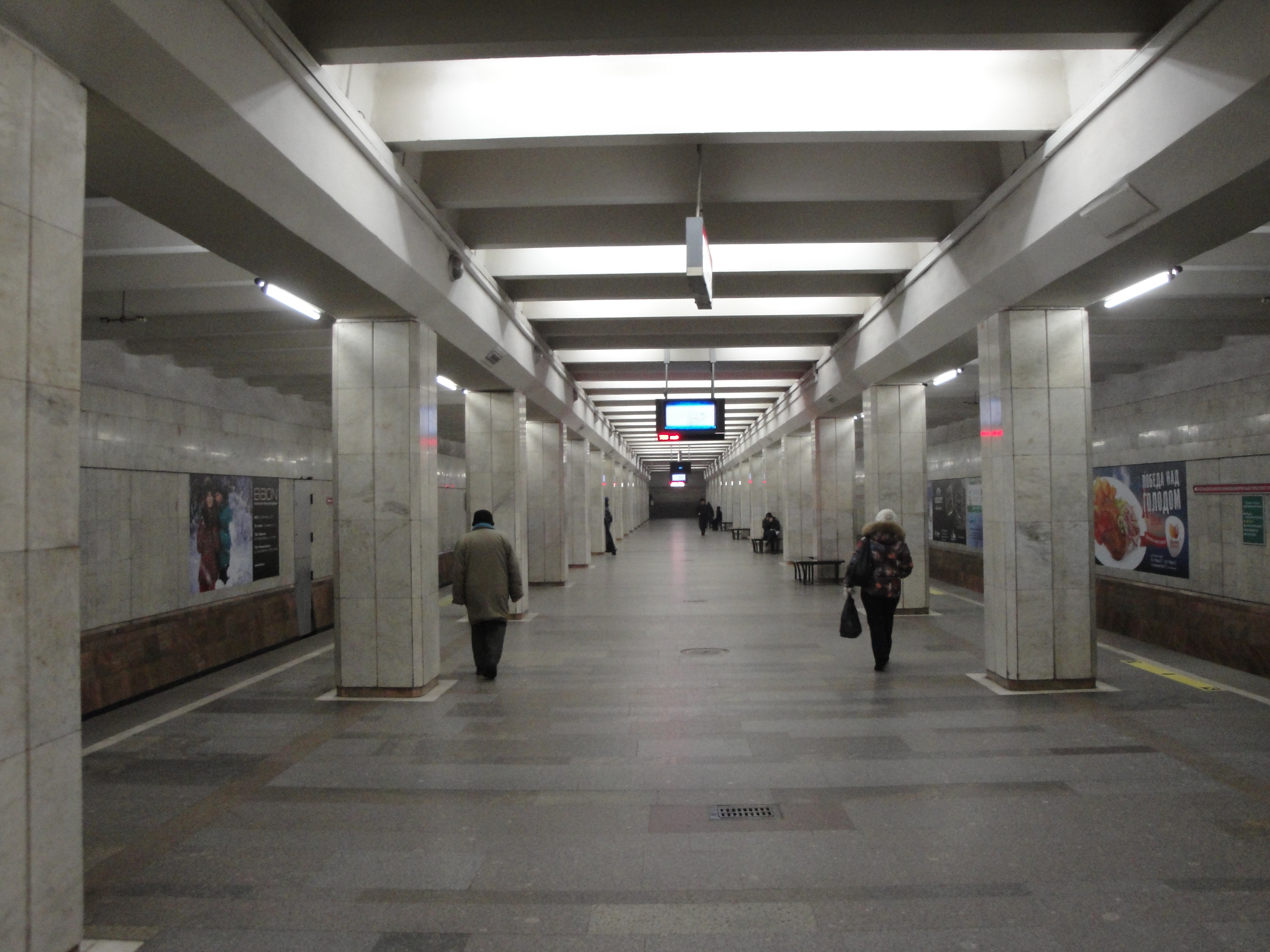
Studencheskaya
