= Novosibirsk Thermal Power Plant 3 =

Power plant in Novosibirsk, Russia

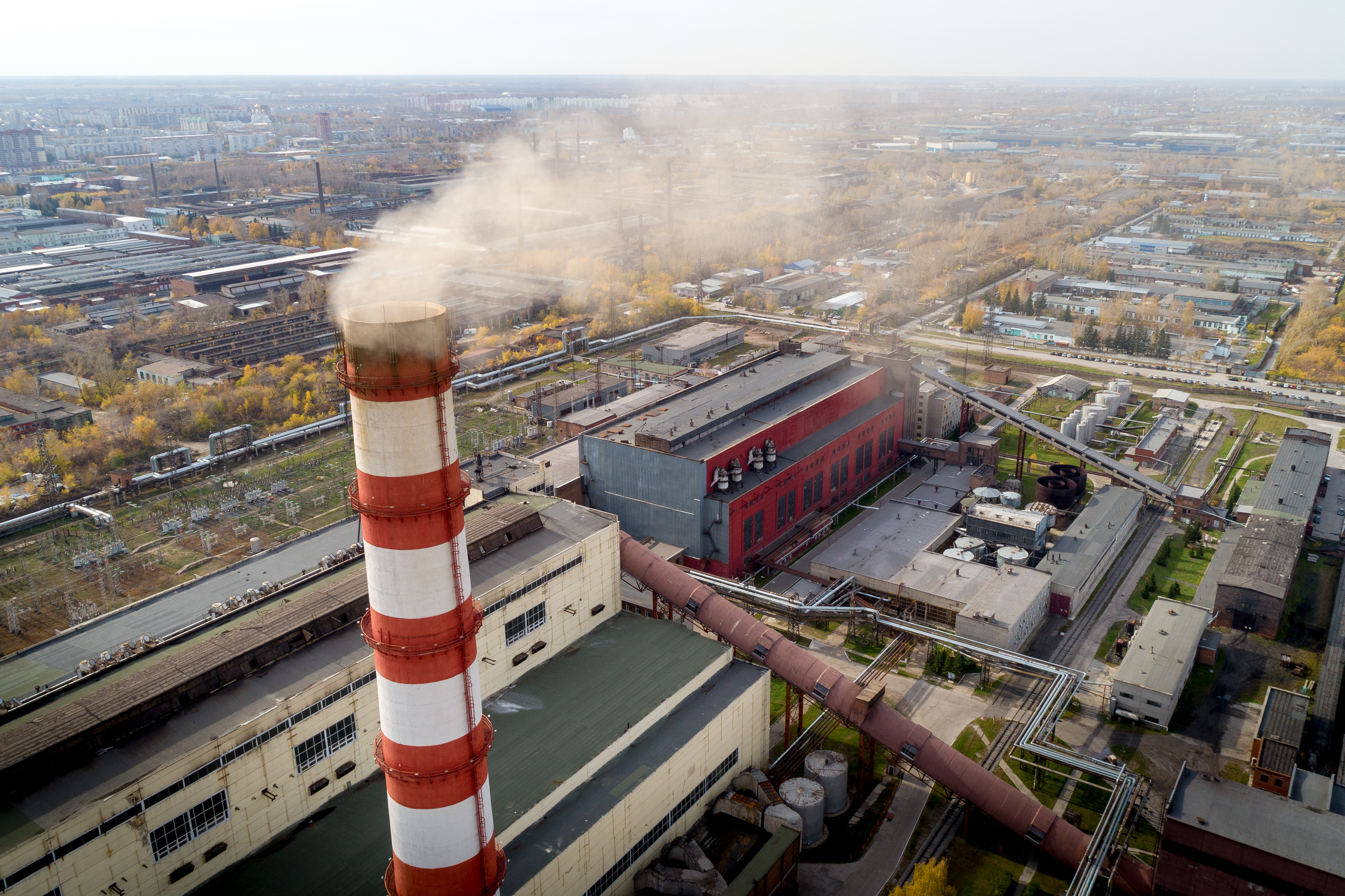
- Official name: Новосибирская ТЭЦ-3
- Country: Russia
- Location: Novosibirsk
- Coordinates: 55°00′29″N 82°51′14″E
- Status: Operational
- Commission date: 1942

Power generation
- Nameplate capacity: 500 MW

External links
- Commons: Related media on Commons

Novosibirsk Thermal Power Plant 3 (Russian: Новосибирская ТЭЦ-3) is a coal-fired power plant located in the Leninsky City District of Novosibirsk, Russia. It started operating in 1942.

== History ==
In 1939, the construction of the power station began at the Sibselmash Plant.

The thermal power plant started operating on 2 October 1942.
