= Novosibirsk-Zapadny railway station =

Railway station in Novosibirsk, Russia

Novosibirsk-Zapadny
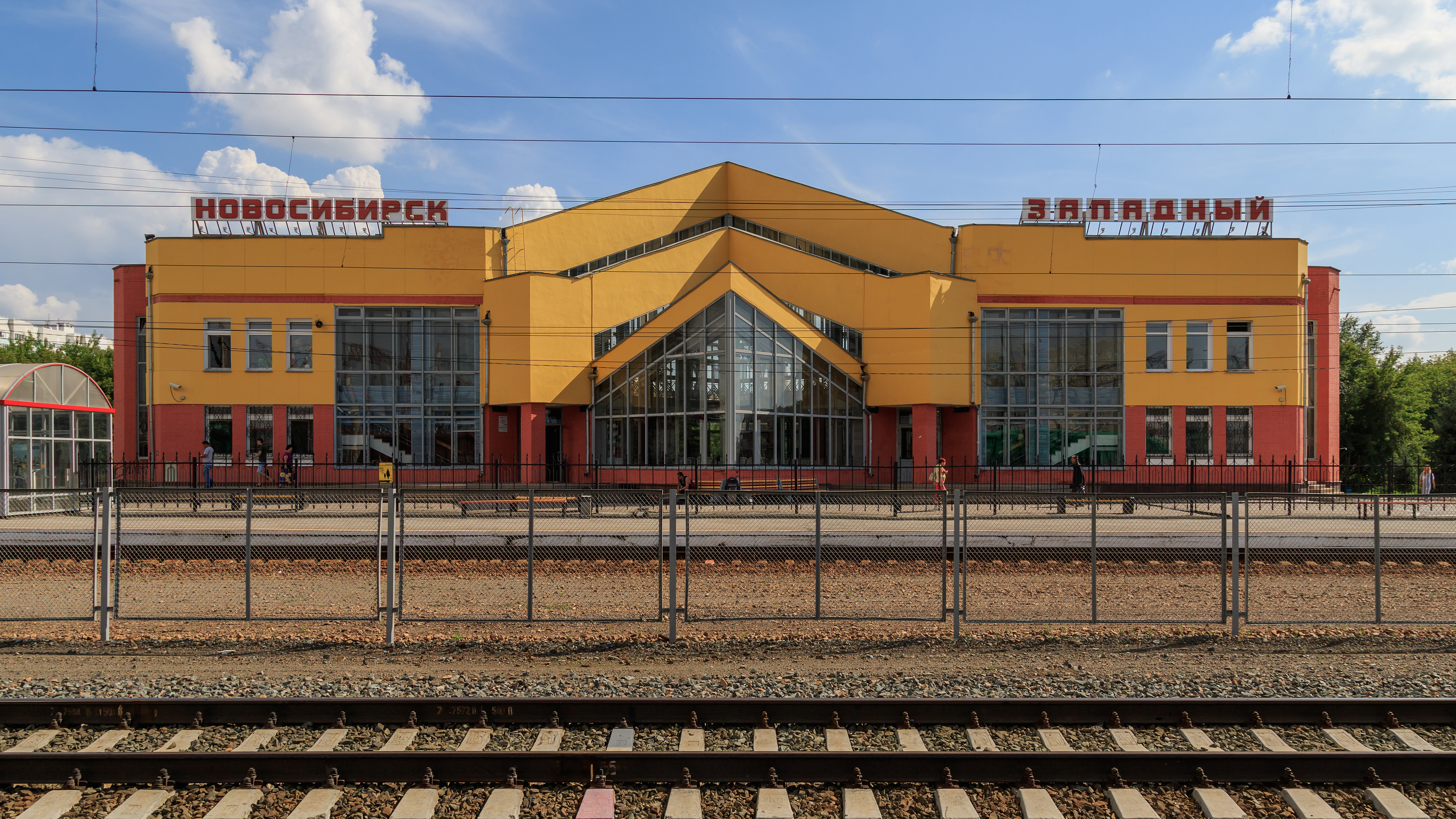

General information
- Location: Russia, Novosibirsk
- Coordinates: 54.9958°N 82.8542°E
- Owner: Russian Railways

History
- Opened: 1896
- Former names: Krivoshchyokovo
Location

Novosibirsk-Zapadny (Russian: Новосибирск-Западный) is a passenger railway station along the Trans-Siberian Railway. It is located in Leninsky City District of Novosibirsk, Russia.

== History ==
The station was opened in 1896.

== Location ==
Novosibirsk-Zapadny Railway Station is located in Leninsky District between Stantsionnaya and Shirokaya streets.

== Gallery ==
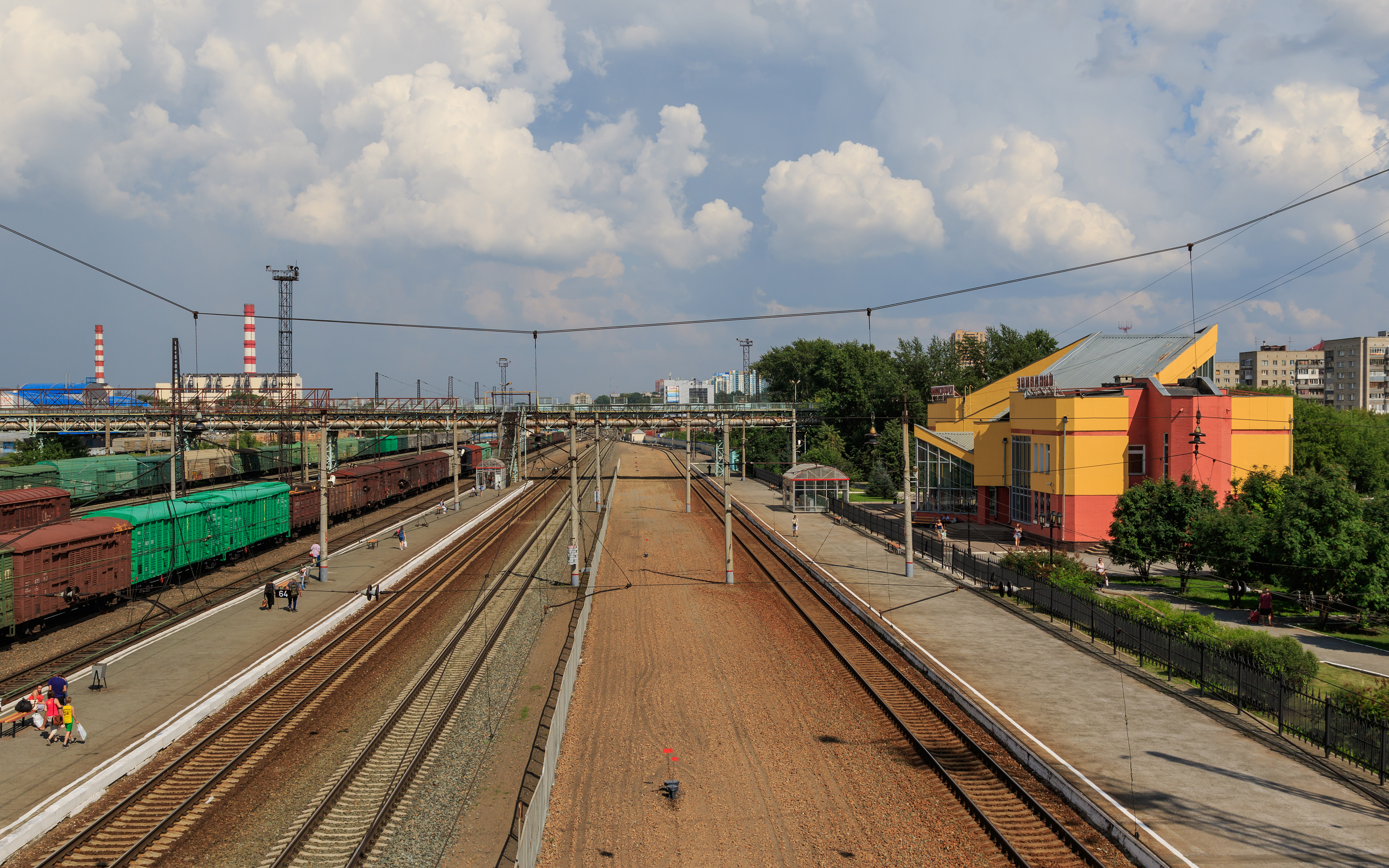
