= Karl Marx Square Water Tower =

Water tower in Leninsky, Novosibirsk, Russia

- Водонапорная башня на площади Маркса
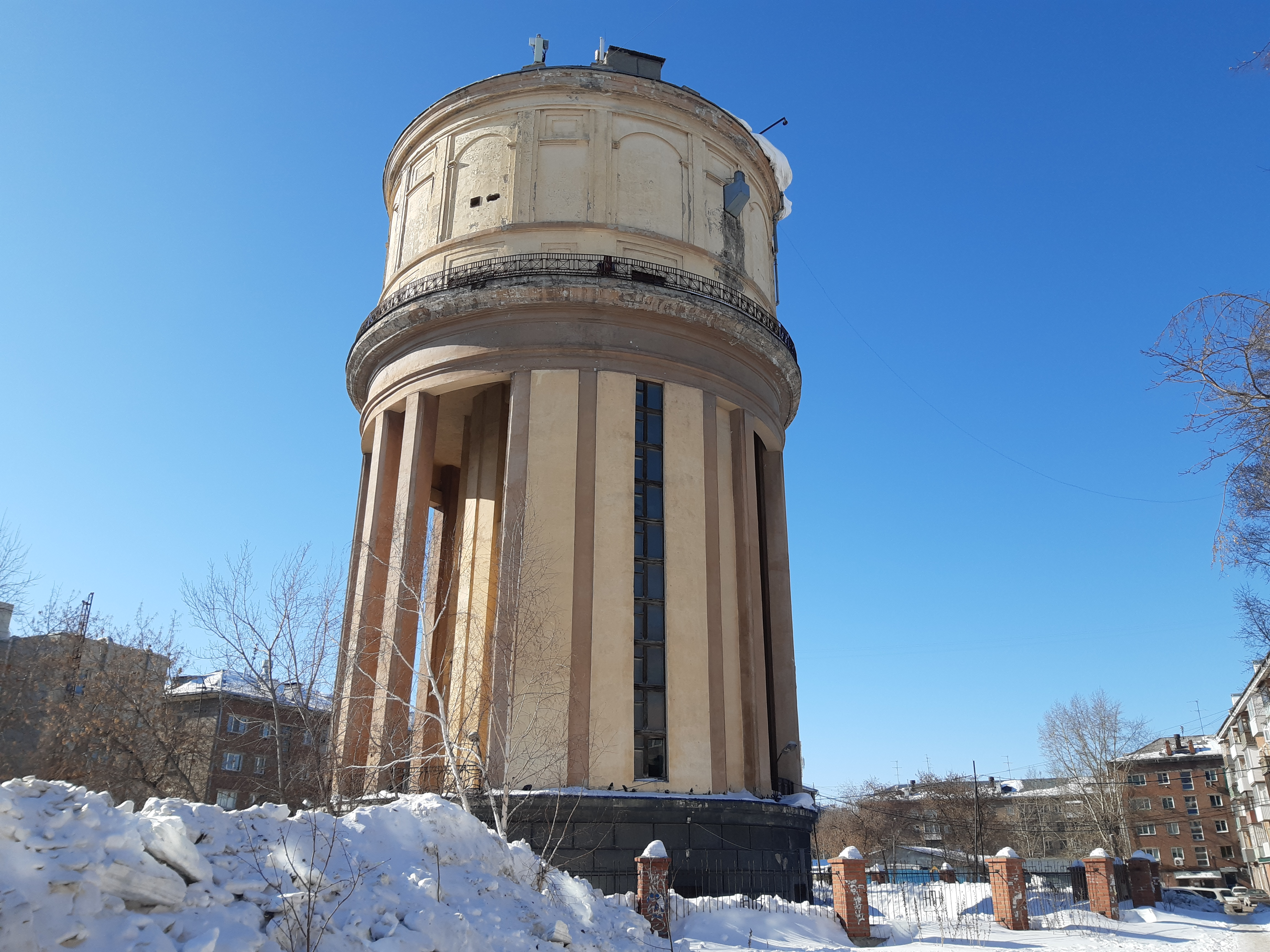
- Interactive map of the Karl Marx Square Water Tower area

General information
- Type: Water tower
- Location: Novosibirsk, Russia, Vatutin Street 29/1
- Coordinates: 54.98291°N 82.89864°E
- Completed: 1939

Karl Marx Square Water Tower (Russian: Водонапорная башня на площади Маркса) is a water tower in Leninsky District of Novosibirsk, Russia. It was built in 1939.

== History ==
In 1930, Zaobsky District was formed in Novosibirsk, which included the settlements of the left bank of the Ob. In 1938–1939, a water tower was built to ensure uninterrupted water supply to residents of the district. The tower also provided water for the Sibselmash Plant.

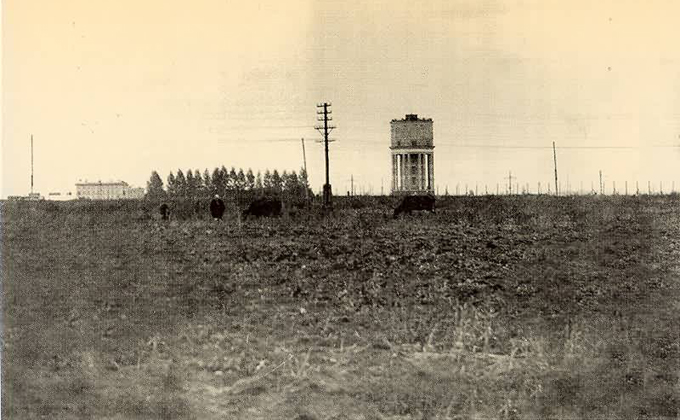
The tower in 1939.

At first, the water tower was surrounded by potato fields; later, residential buildings appeared here.

In the middle of the 20th century, the tower ceased to function and stood abandoned until 1985, after which it was occupied by a youth club.

In the 1990s, the tower housed the NTN-4 television company, which ceased to exist in 2005. Inside the tower, the studio interior of the NTN-4 has been preserved, and its logos have also been preserved on the tower fence.

== Gallery ==
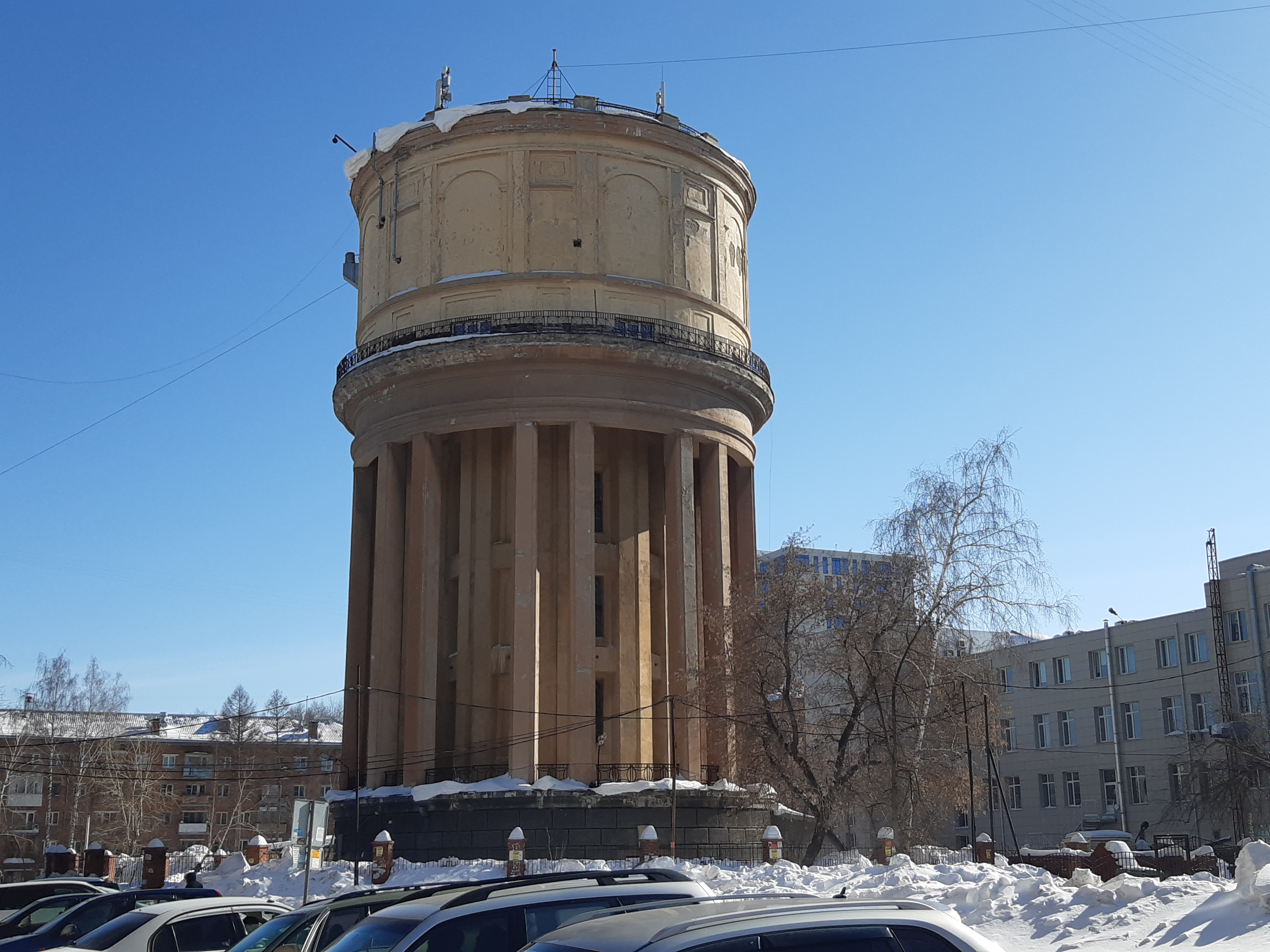

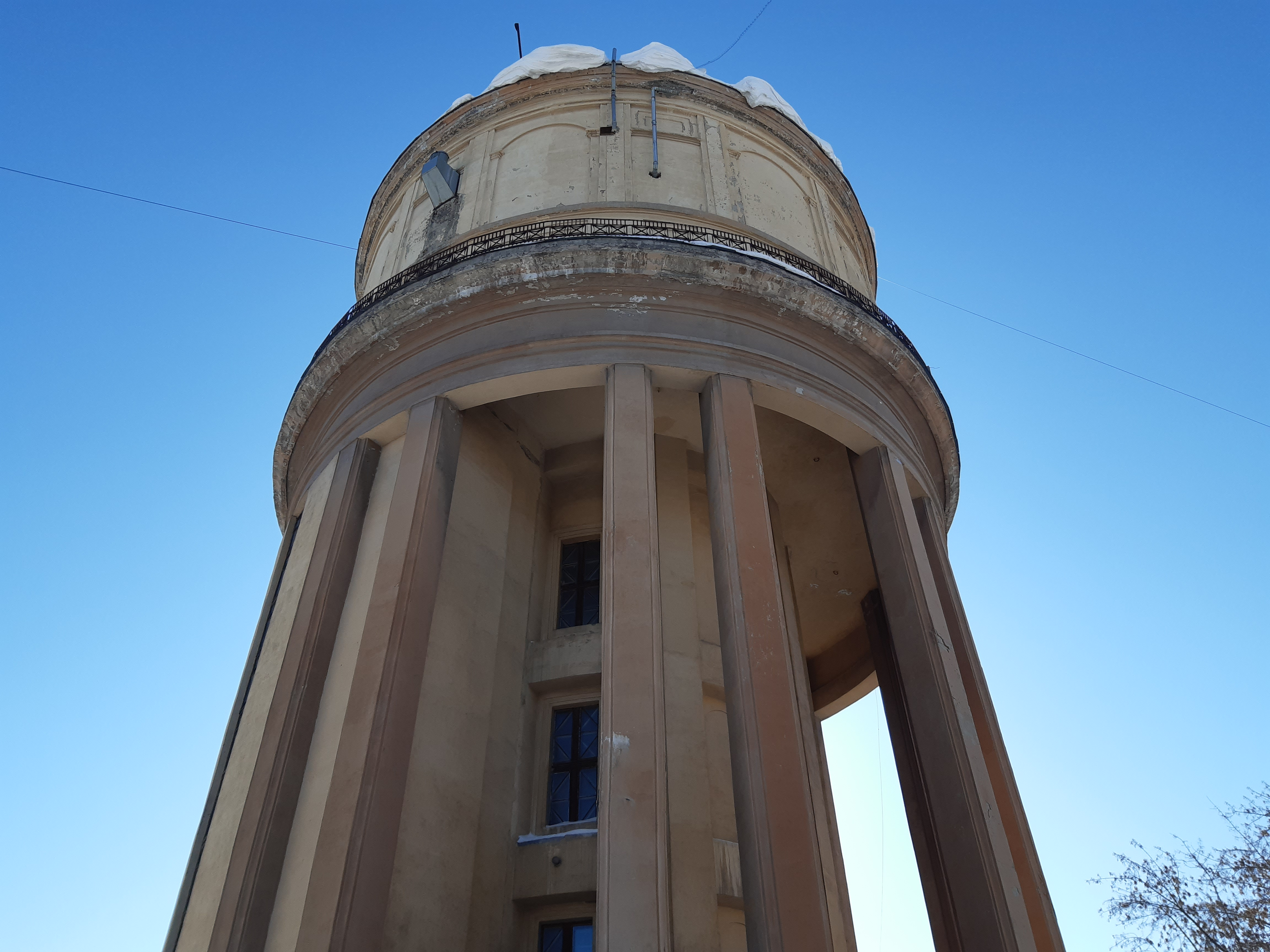

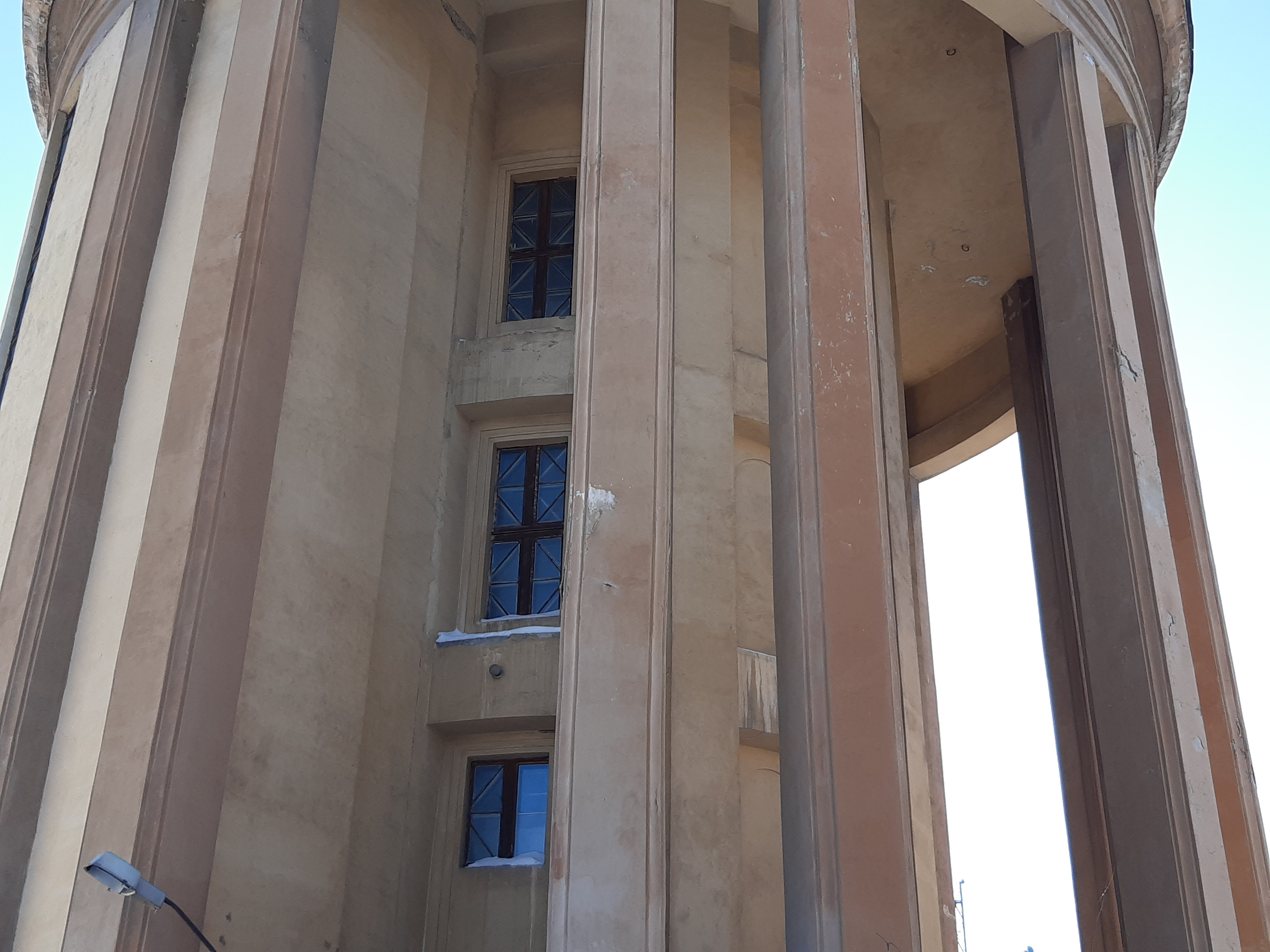

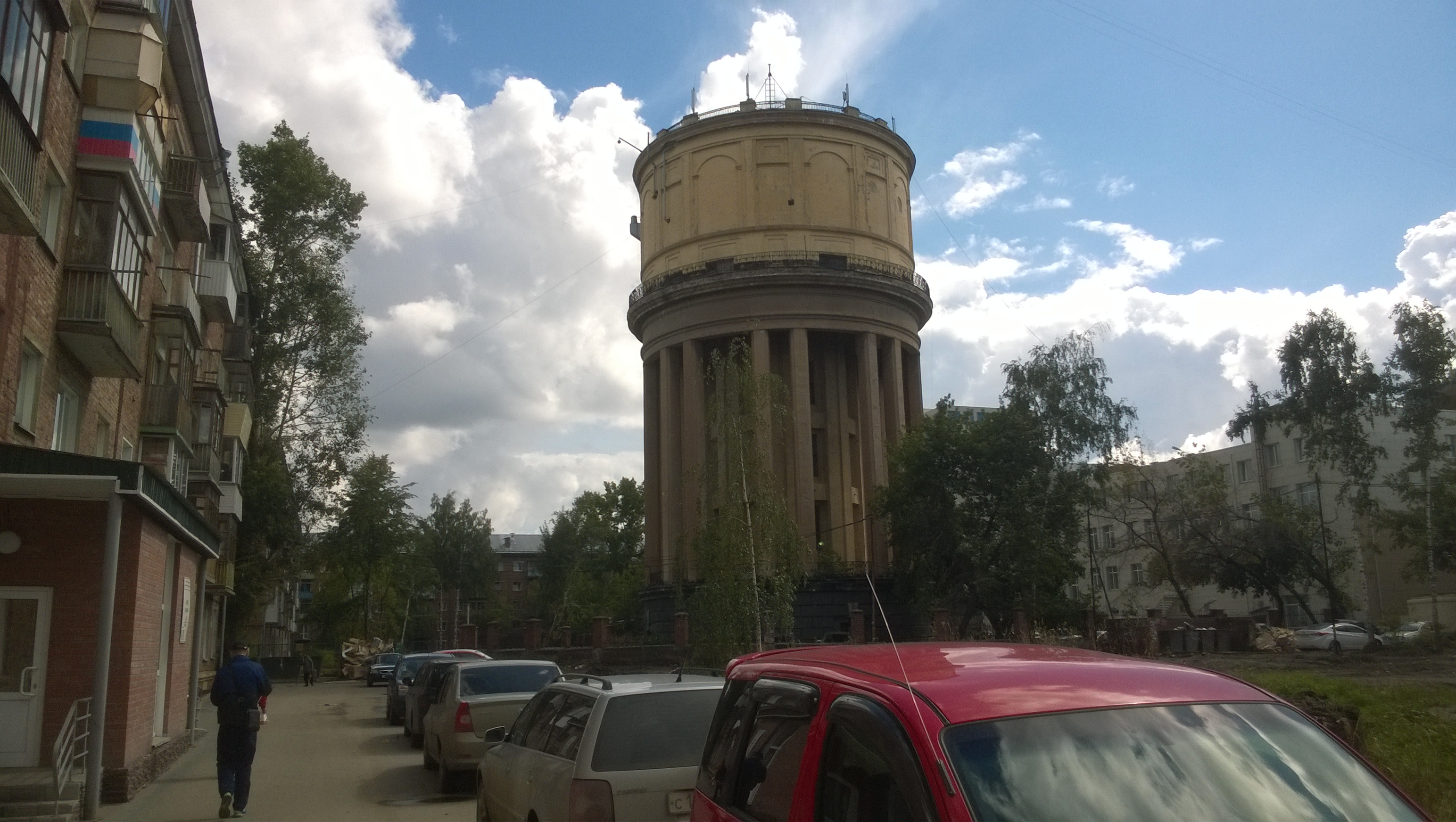
