= Kleshchikha railway station =

Railway station in Novosibirsk, Russia

Coordinates: 54°57′58″N 82°49′11″E

Kleshchikha (Russian: Клещиха) is a large railway marshalling yard in the Novosibirsk Region of the West Siberian Railway. It is located in Leninsky District of Novosibirsk, Russia.

== Ecology ==
Garbage was regularly accumulated along the Kleshchikha-Ob line section. The illegal discharge of household waste stopped only after the installation of a 24-hour video surveillance system.
