= NPM Group =

- Company type: Limited liability company LLC
- Industry: Manufacturing
- Founded: 1997; 28 years ago
- Founder: Sergey Buchik
- Headquarters: Novosibirsk, Russia
- Area served: Worldwide
- Products: Equipment for bottling carbonated drinks, equipment for foam-free dispensing of foamy beverages, plastic injection moulding
- Number of employees: 250 (2025)
- Website: npmgroup.ru

NPM Group (originally called Novosibirskprodmash) is a Russian manufacturing company that produced equipment for fast foam-free dispensing of foamy beverages and milk vending machines and other food and drink processing devices. The company was founded in Novosibirsk in 1997.

== History ==
The company was founded in Novosibirsk in 1997 and was originally called Novosibirskprodmash.

In 2001 it developed a water bottling line of equipment. In 2002 it developed beer dispensing equipment for small and medium breweries and in 2003 started supplying these to China. The company's devices were often tampered with by unscrupulous manufacturers from China. According to Sergei Buchik, he lost 15% of sales due to Chinese counterfeits in 2010.

In 2013 the company was rebranded as NPM Group.

== Brands ==
=== Pegas ===
Pegas is an apparatus for fast foam-free dispensing of foamy beverages (beer and others). It is installed in retail outlets. Its operation principle is based on the back pressure: the bottle is filled with a gas, then the beer squeezes it out of the container. Beer is fed into the bottle under pressure, and the back pressure in the bottle pushes and extinguishes the foam. This method had already been followed in industrial production, however, the company patented seven devices that operate on the basis of back pressure.

=== MilkBox ===
MilkBoxes are milk vending machines disseminated in Novosibirsk, Novosibirsk Oblast and Yekaterinburg (as of 2016).

== Exports ==
The company exports its products to Europe, CIS, China, North and South America.
