= Institute of Laser Physics =

Research institute in Akademgorodok of Novosibirsk, Russia

Institute of Laser Physics of the Siberian Branch of the RAS
- Established: 1991
- Director: Alexey Taichenachev
- Owner: Siberian Branch of the RAS
- Address: Lavrentyev Prospekt 13, Novosibirsk, 630090, Russia
- Location: Novosibirsk, Russia
- Website: www.laser.nsc.ru

Institute of Laser Physics of the Siberian Branch of the RAS (Russian: Институт лазерной физики СО РАН) is a research institute in Akademgorodok of Novosibirsk, Russia. It was founded in 1991.

== History ==
The history of the institute begins in the second half of the 1960s, when the Department of Laser Physics was created, headed by V. P. Chebotayev.

At first, the department became part of the Institute of Semiconductor Physics, and since 1978 it has been included in the Institute of Thermophysics. In 1991, the Institute of Laser Physics was established on the basis of the Department of Laser Physics of the Institute of Thermophysics.

== Activities ==
Laser devices of the institute are used in medicine. The scientific organization collaborates with the Novosibirsk Research Institute of Traumatology and Orthopedics and Meshalkin National Medical Research Center.

The institute is developing methods for diagnosing diabetes using terahertz radiation.

Institute scientists created the model of exoplanet atmosphere. They modeled a high-speed energy flow using special plasma sources.

== Divisions ==
- Irkutsk Division of Institute of Laser Physics of the Siberian Branch of the RAS

== Leaders ==
- Veniamin Pavlovich Chebotayev is the first director of the institute
- Sergey Nikolayevich Bagayev (1992–2016)
- Alexey Vladimirovich Taichenachev (since 2016)

== Bibliography ==
- Ламин В. А. (2003). Энциклопедия. Новосибирск. Новосибирск: Новосибирское книжное издательство. p. 372. ISBN 5-7620-0968-8.
