= Frunze Street, Novosibirsk =

Street in Novosibirsk

Frunze Street
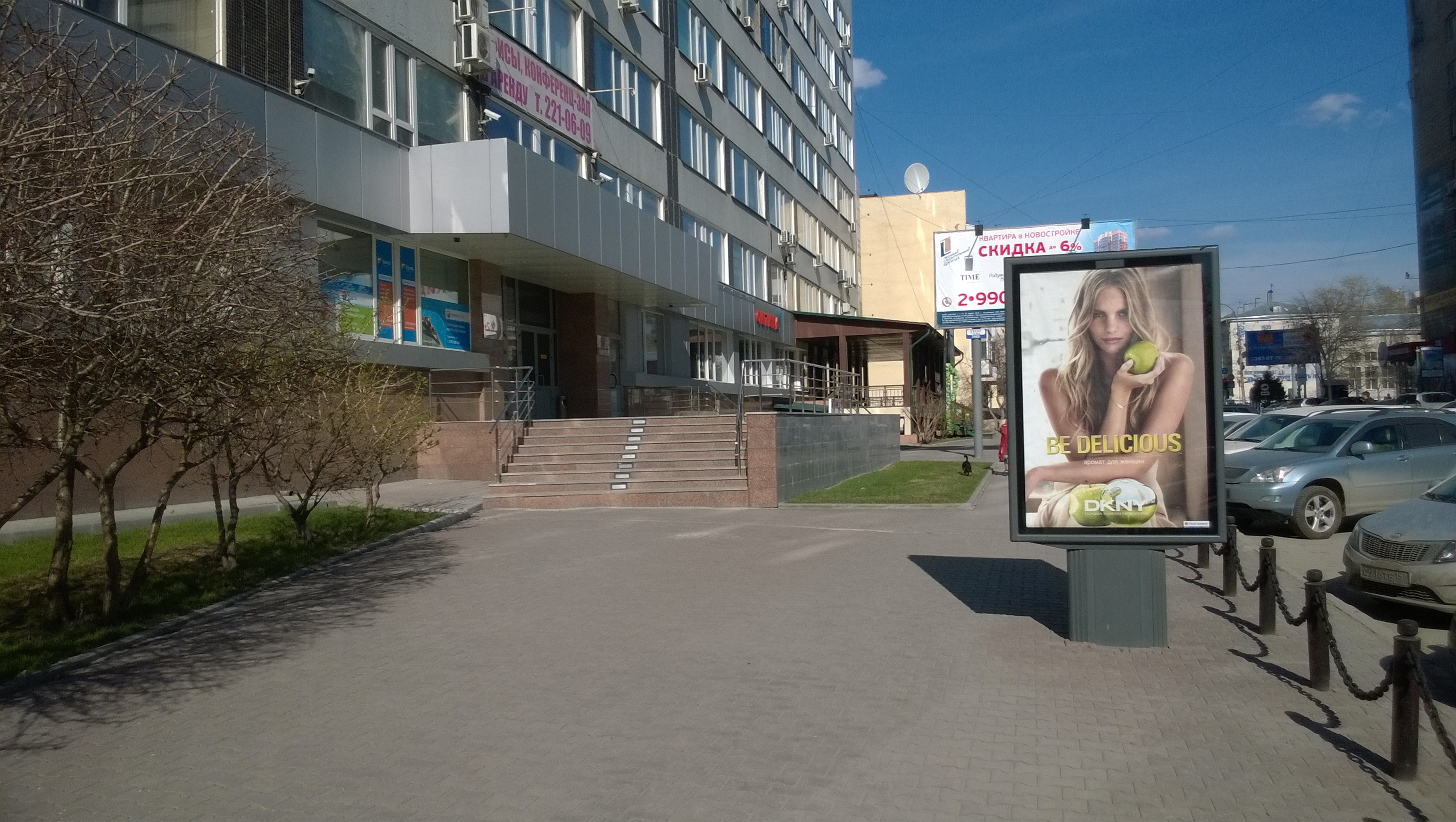
- Native name: Улица Фрунзе (Russian)
- Location: Novosibirsk; Russia
- Nearest metro station: Krasny Prospekt

Frunze Street (Russian: Улица Фрунзе) is a street in Tsentralny and Dzerzhinsky districts of Novosibirsk, Russia. It runs from west to east. The street starts at Kondratyuk Square, crosses Krasny Avenue, Michurin, Kamenskaya, Shamshin Family, Olga Zhilina, Ippodromskaya streets and ends at Koshurnikov Street.

Its length is 3,100 meters.

== Street name ==
The street is named after Mikhail Frunze, Russian Bolshevik leader.

== History ==
Frunze Street is one of the oldest streets in the city, known since 1896 as Vaganovskaya Street.

Initially, the street was on the outskirts of the city, but gradually it became one of the busiest roads on the right bank of Novosibirsk.

== Organization ==
=== Scientific and educational organizations ===
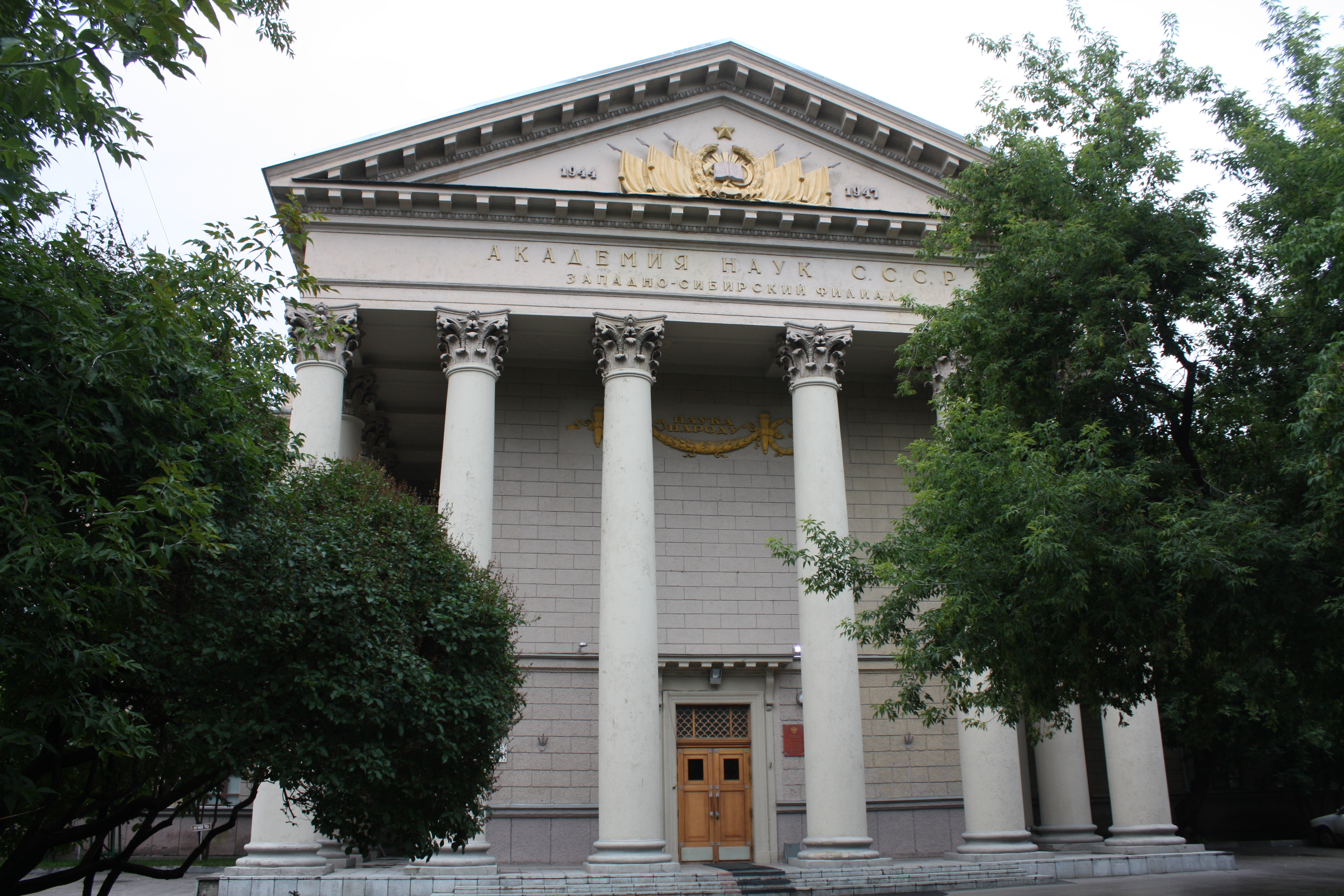
Institute of Systematics and Ecology of Animals

- Novosibirsk State Medical University a higher education institution created in 1935.
- Institute of Mining SB RAS is a research institute organized in 1943.
- Institute of Systematics and Ecology of Animals is a scientific organization created in 1944.
- Novosibirsk Research Institute of Traumatology and Orthopedics is a medical and scientific organization founded in 1946.

=== Military organizations ===
- Siberian National Guard District

== Buildings and structures ==
- Spartak Stadium is a football stadium built in 1927. It is located in the city block between Frunze, Kamenskaya, Krylov and Michurin streets.
- House of Society of Political Prisoners is a constructivist building constructed in 1933.
- Kuzbassugol Building Complex is a constructivist building complex built in 1933. It is located in the city block between Frunze, Sovetskaya, Derzhavin streets and Krasny Avenue.

== See also ==
- Gogol Street
