= Gogol Street, Novosibirsk =

Street in Novosibirsk, Russia

Gogol Street
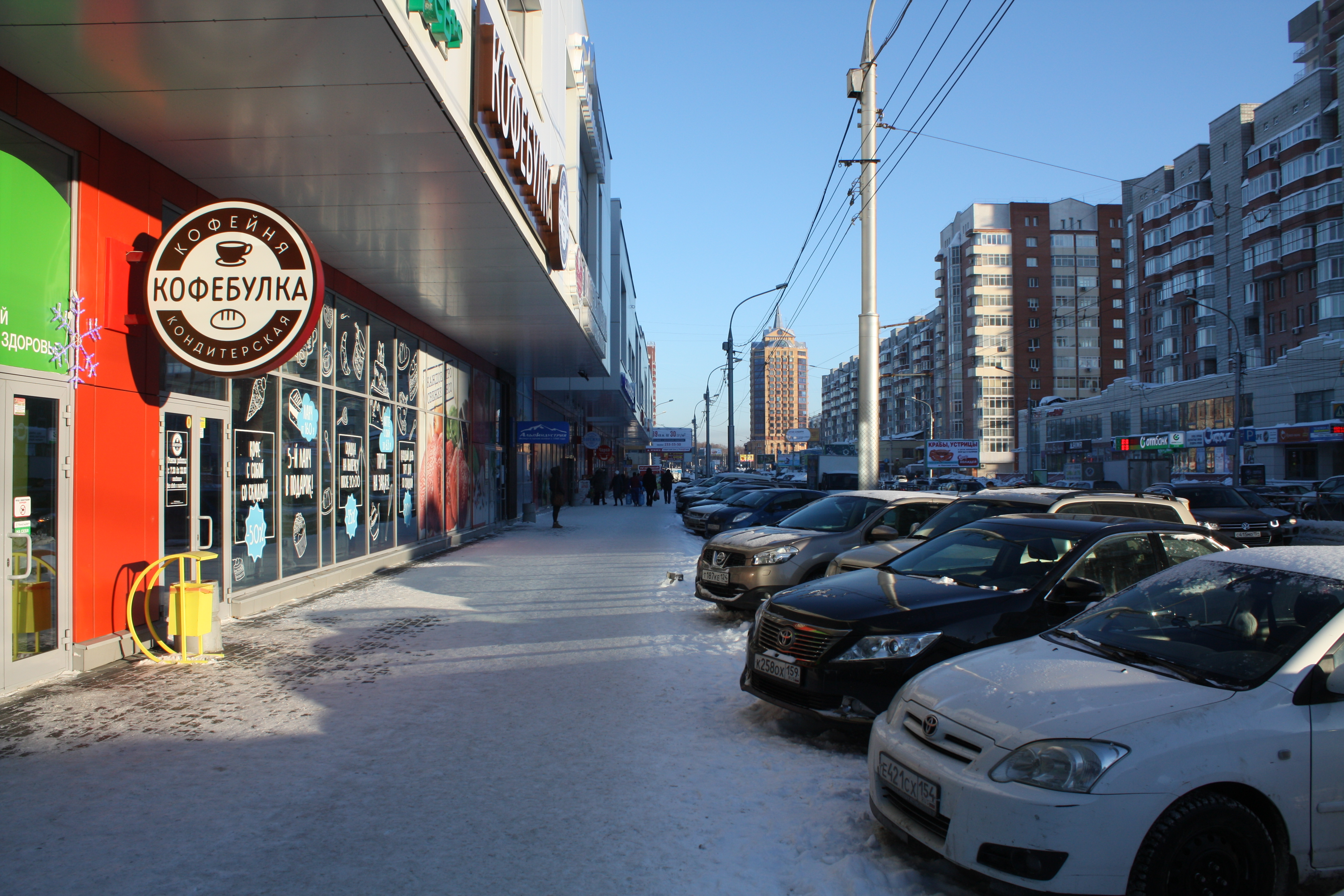
- Native name: Улица Гоголя (Russian)
- Location: Novosibirsk, Russia
- Nearest metro station: Krasny Prospekt; Sibirskaya; Marshala Pokryshkina

Gogol Street (Russian: Улица Гоголя) is a street in Tsentralny and Dzerzhinsky districts of Novosibirsk, Russia. It consists of two fragments. The first fragment starts at the intersection with Sovetskaya and Chelyuskintsev streets and runs east, crosses Krasny Avenue, Michurin, Kamenskaya, Shamshin Family, Olga Zhilina, Ippodromskaya streets and forms the intersection with the Seleznyov and Koshurnikov streets, then the street is interrupted by Beryozovaya Roshcha Park. The second street fragment branches off from Dzerzhinsky Prospekt, then runs north-east parallel to it, crosses Krasin, Korolyov, Kombinatskaya streets and connects with Trikotazhnaya Street.

== History ==
In 1908, 37 nameless streets of the city received names. Among them, 21 streets were named after Russian writers and one street was named in honor of the Russian painter. This street was named after Nikolai Gogol.

In 1911, the New City Cemetery was opened on the street.

August 29, 1947, Novosibirsk Zoo was opened on the street. Then it has been gradually moved from Gogol Street to Zayeltsovsky District. In 2000, the zoo finally moved to the new place.

== Architecture ==
- Officers' House is a building on the corner of Krasny Avenue and Gogol Street. It was built in 1916–1925. Architects: Andrey Kryachkov, B. M. Blazhovsky.
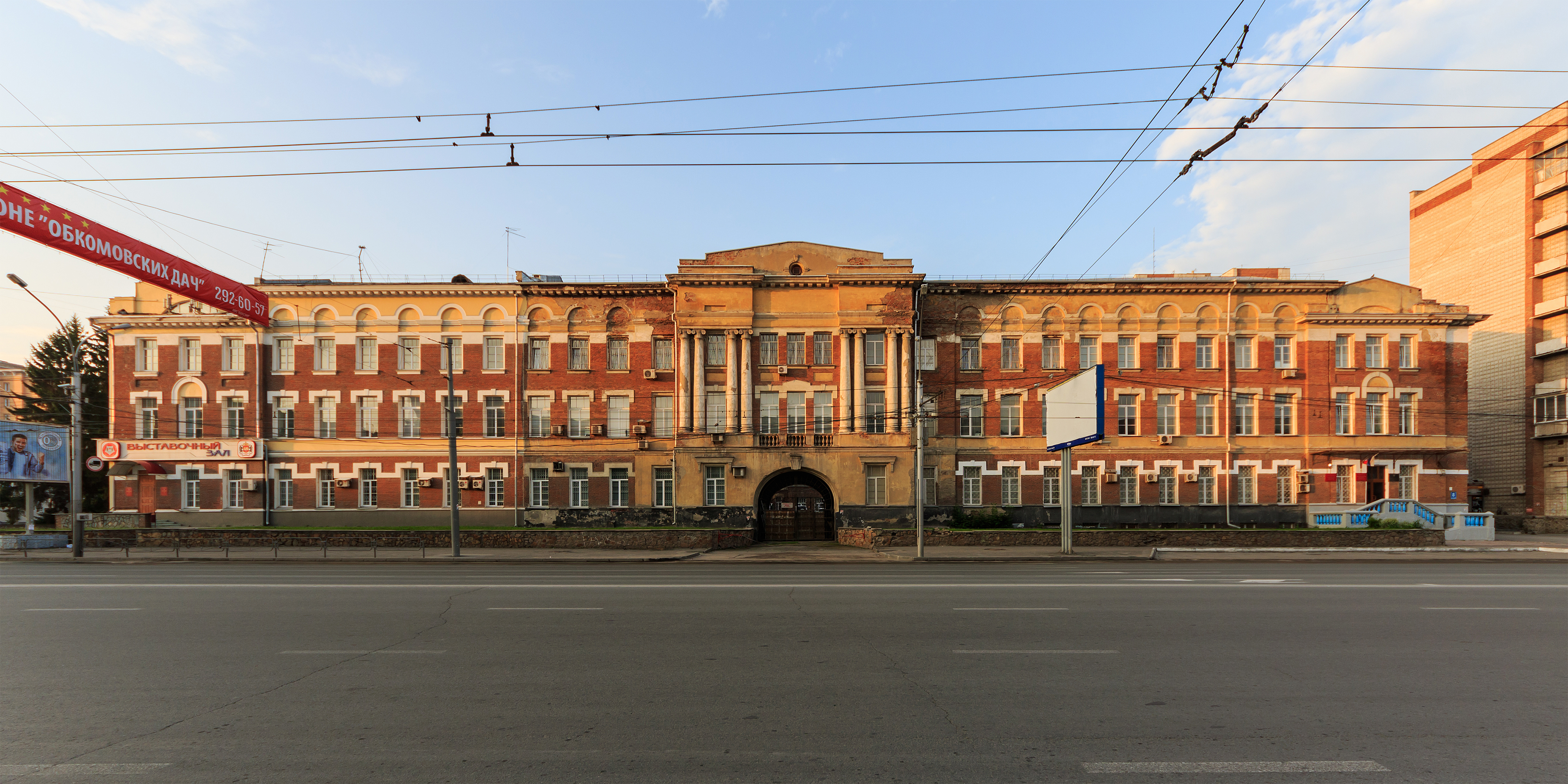
Officers' House

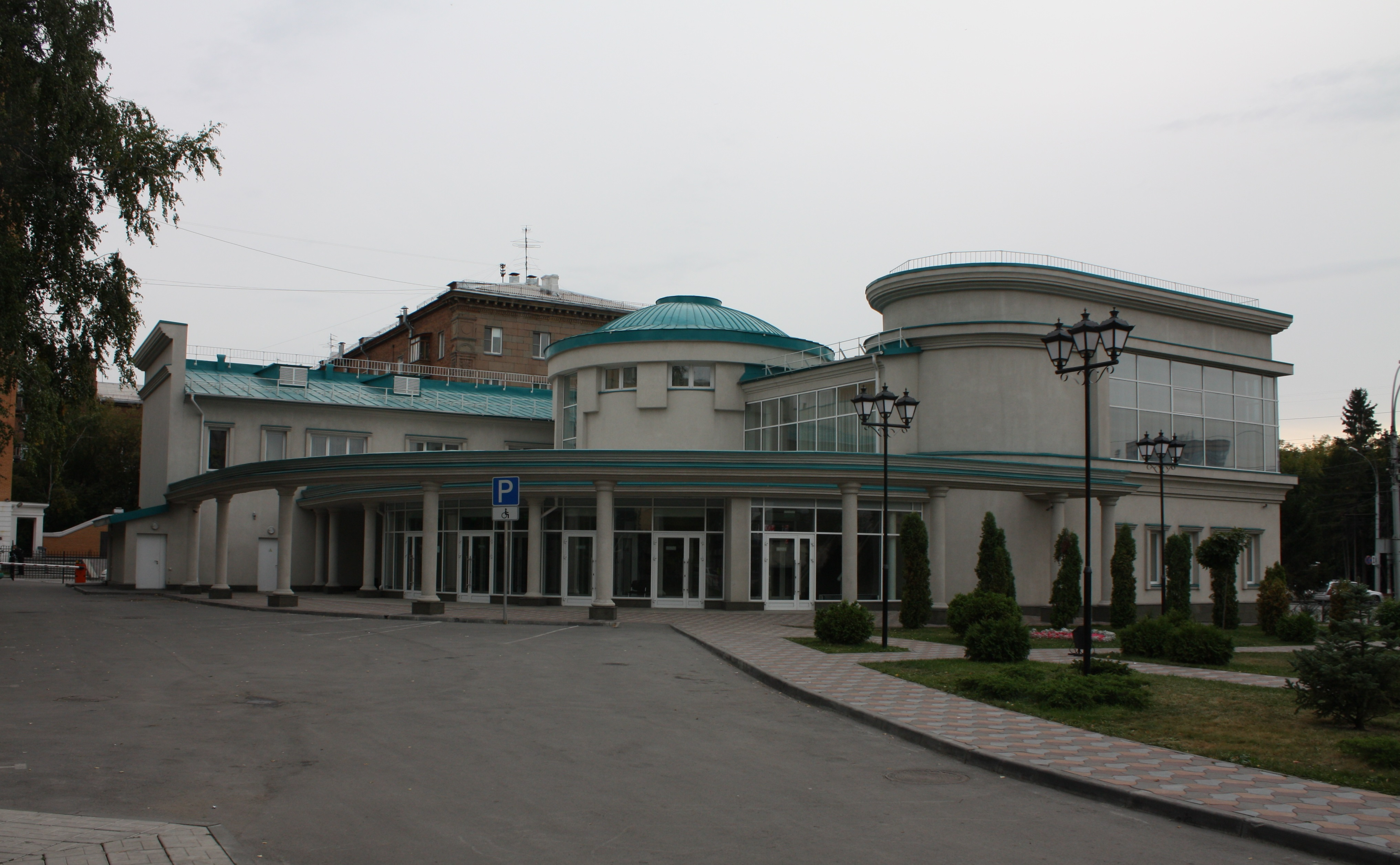
The Civil Registry, the corner of Gogol Street and Krasny Avenue

== Educational institutions ==
- Fraules Dance Centre
- School No. 18
- School No. 82

== Gallery ==
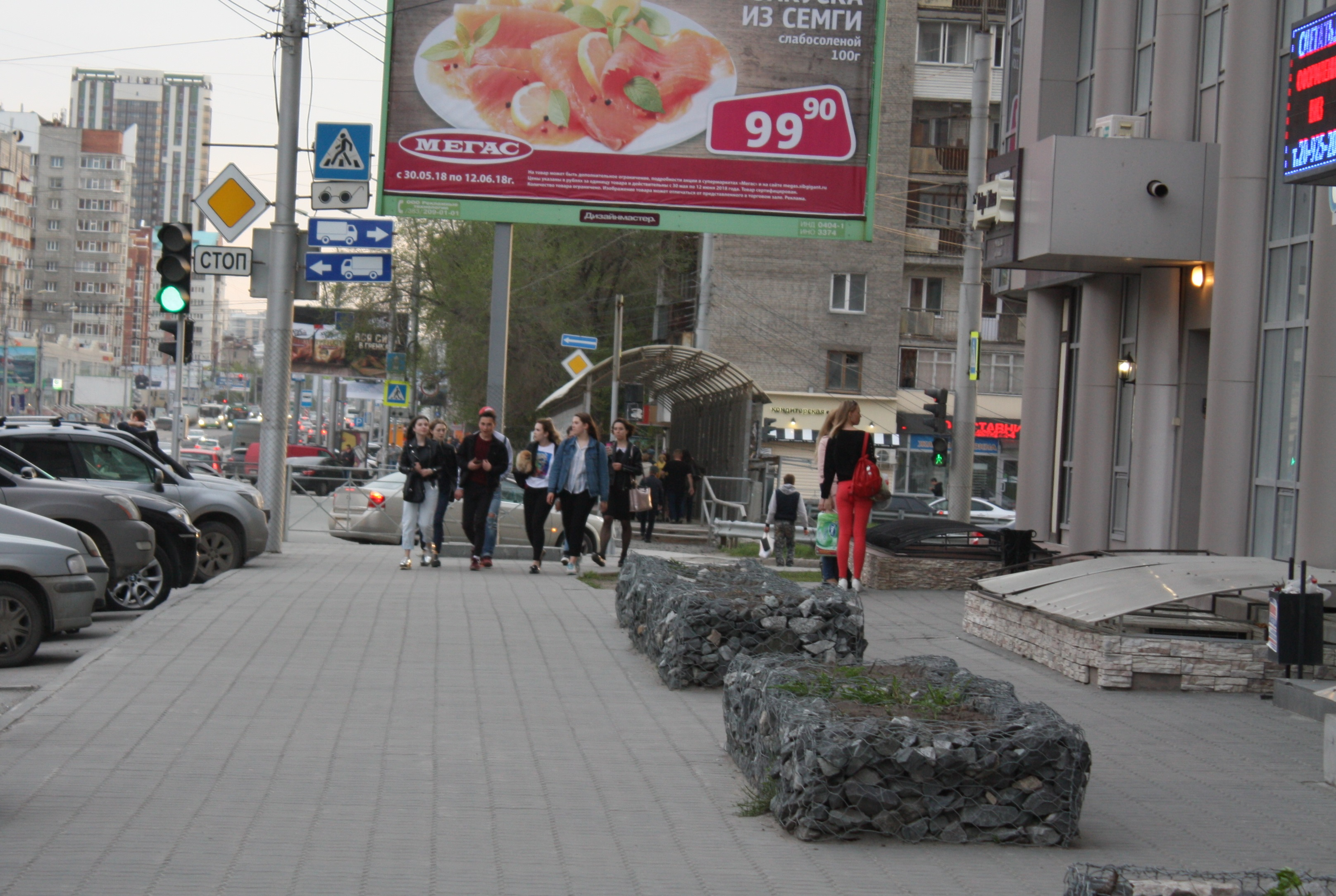

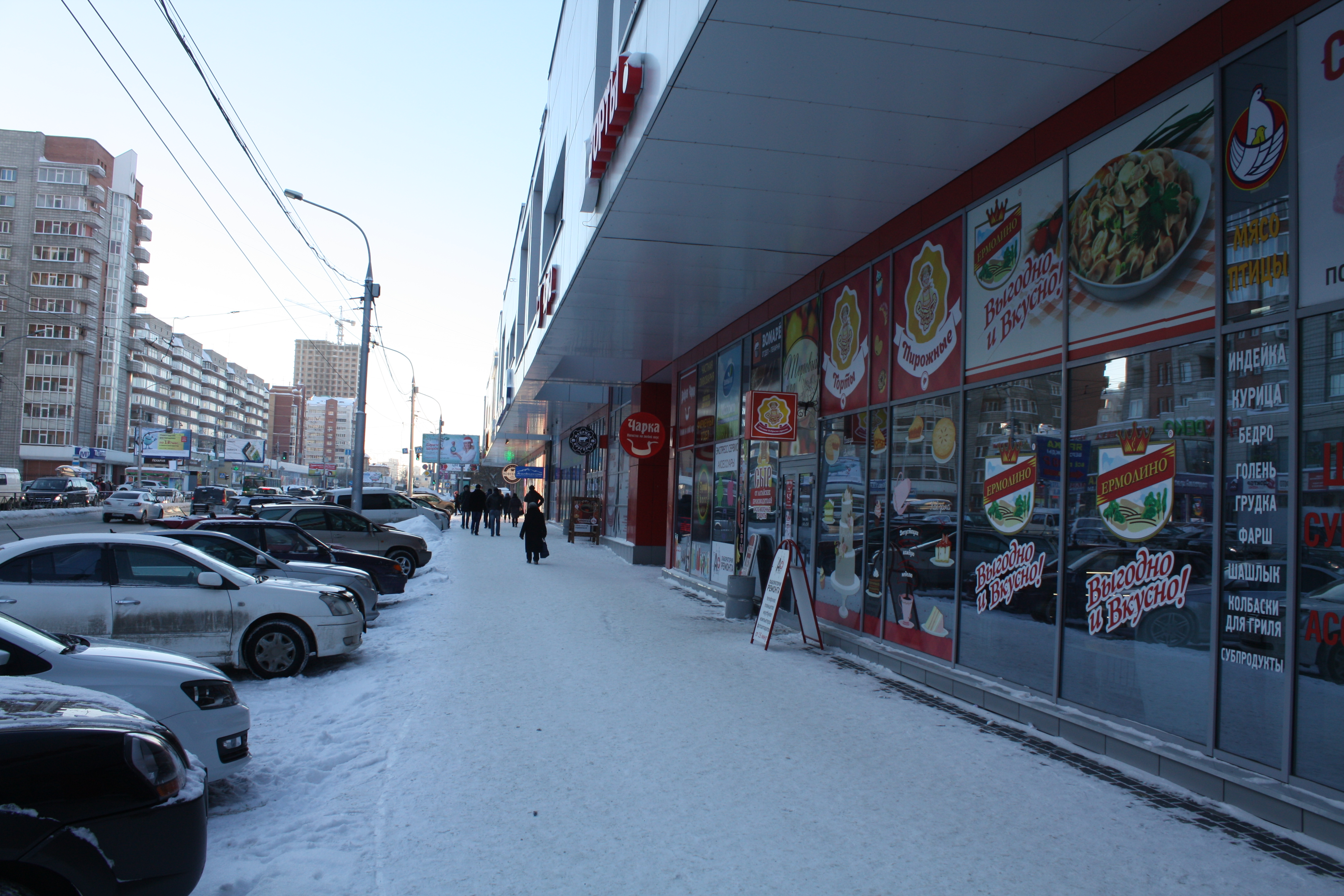

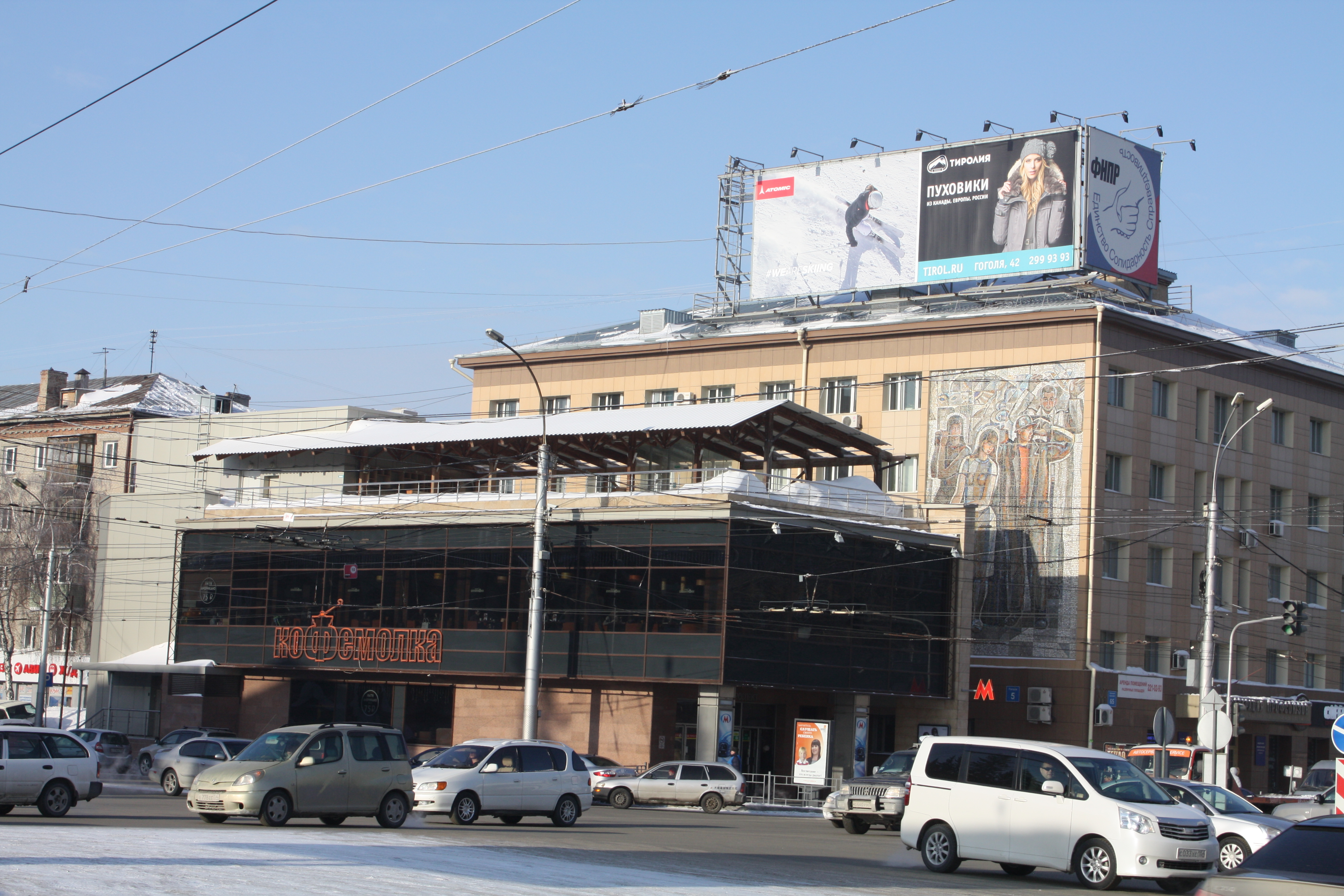
The corner of Krasny Avenue and Gogol Street

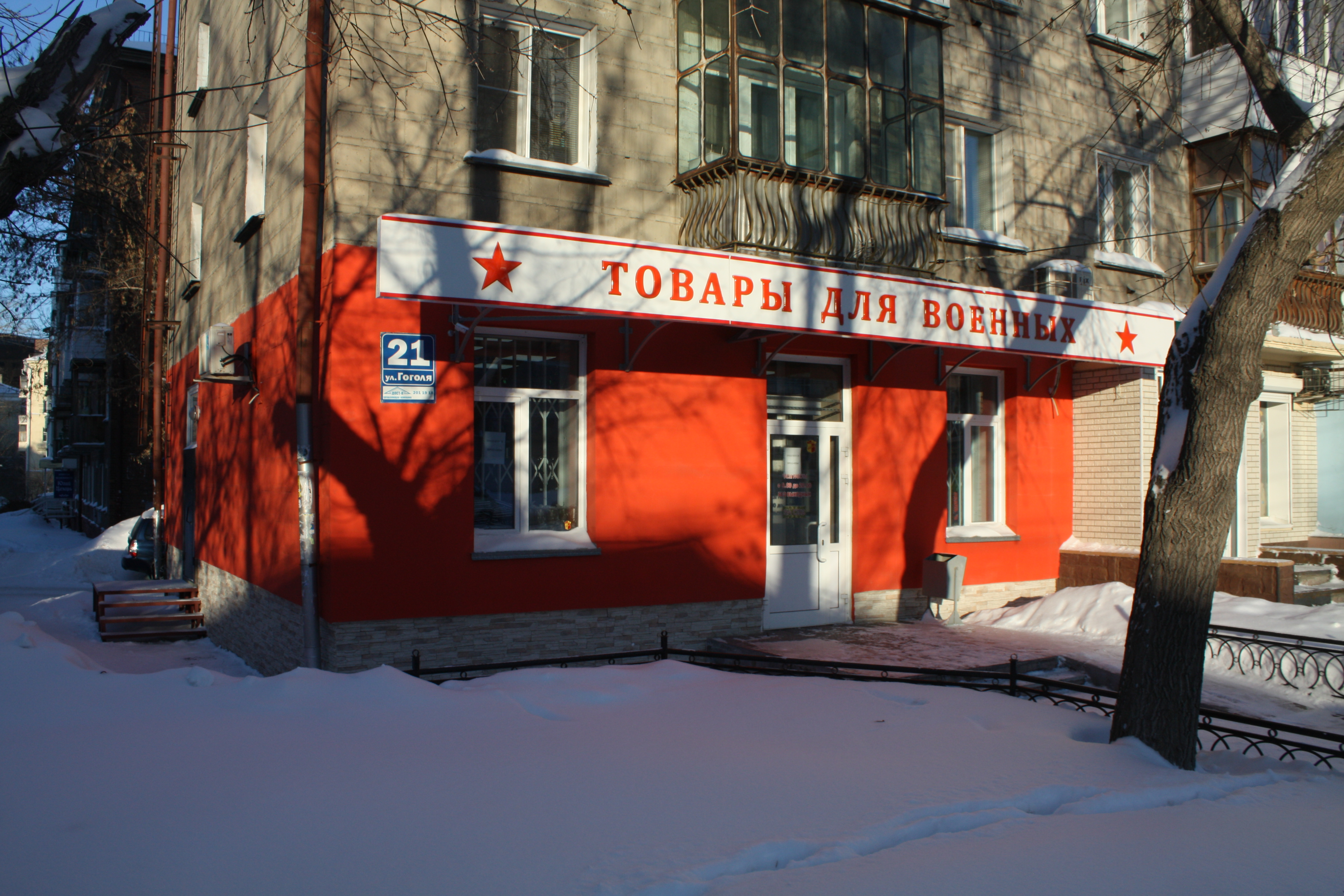

== Transportation ==
=== Metro ===
Three Novosibirsk metro stations are located on the street: Krasny Prospekt, Sibirskaya and Marshala Pokryshkina. Also Beryozovaya Roshcha Station is located near the street.

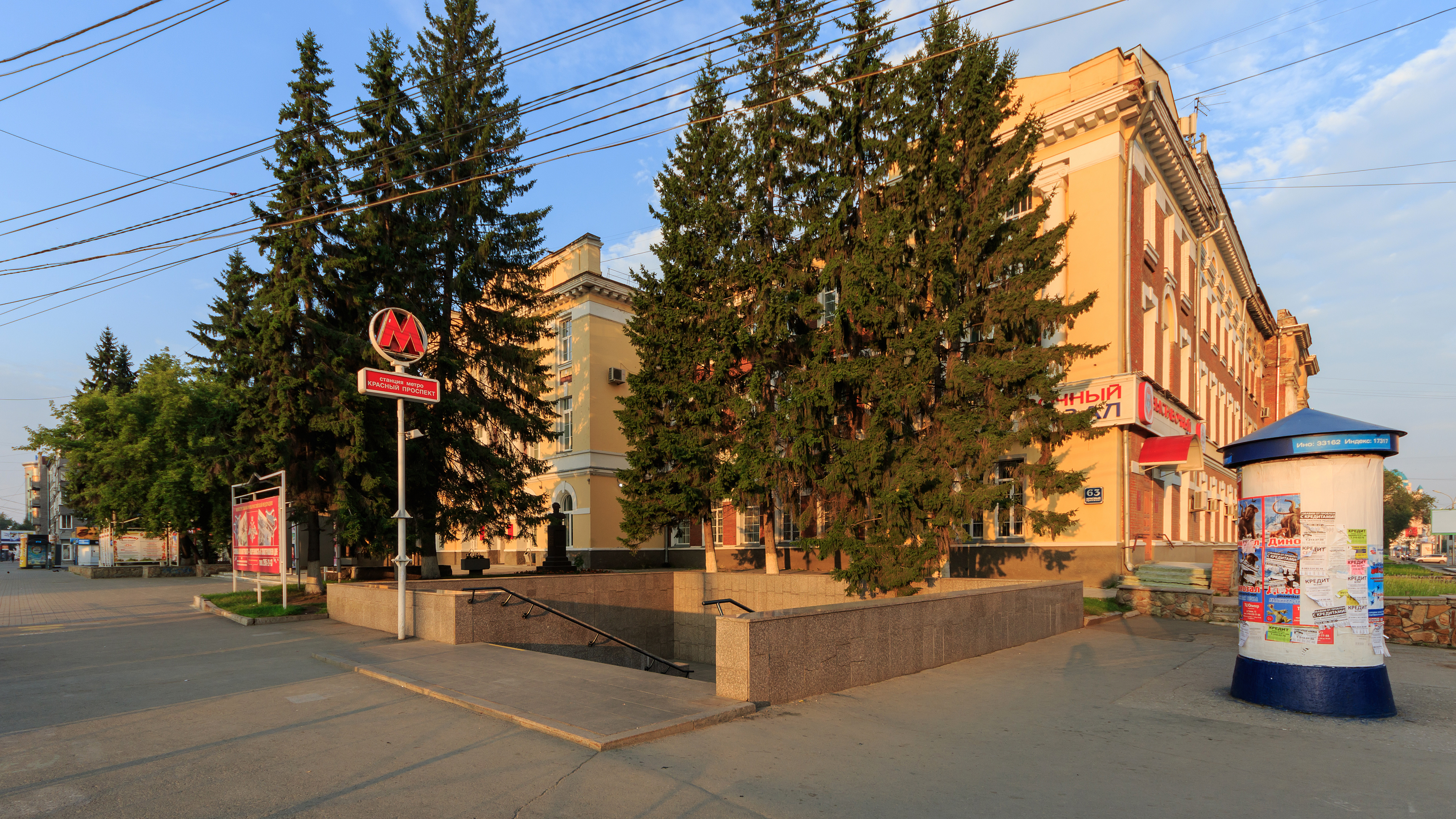
Entrance to Krasny Prospekt Station. The corner of Krasny Avenue and Gogol Street

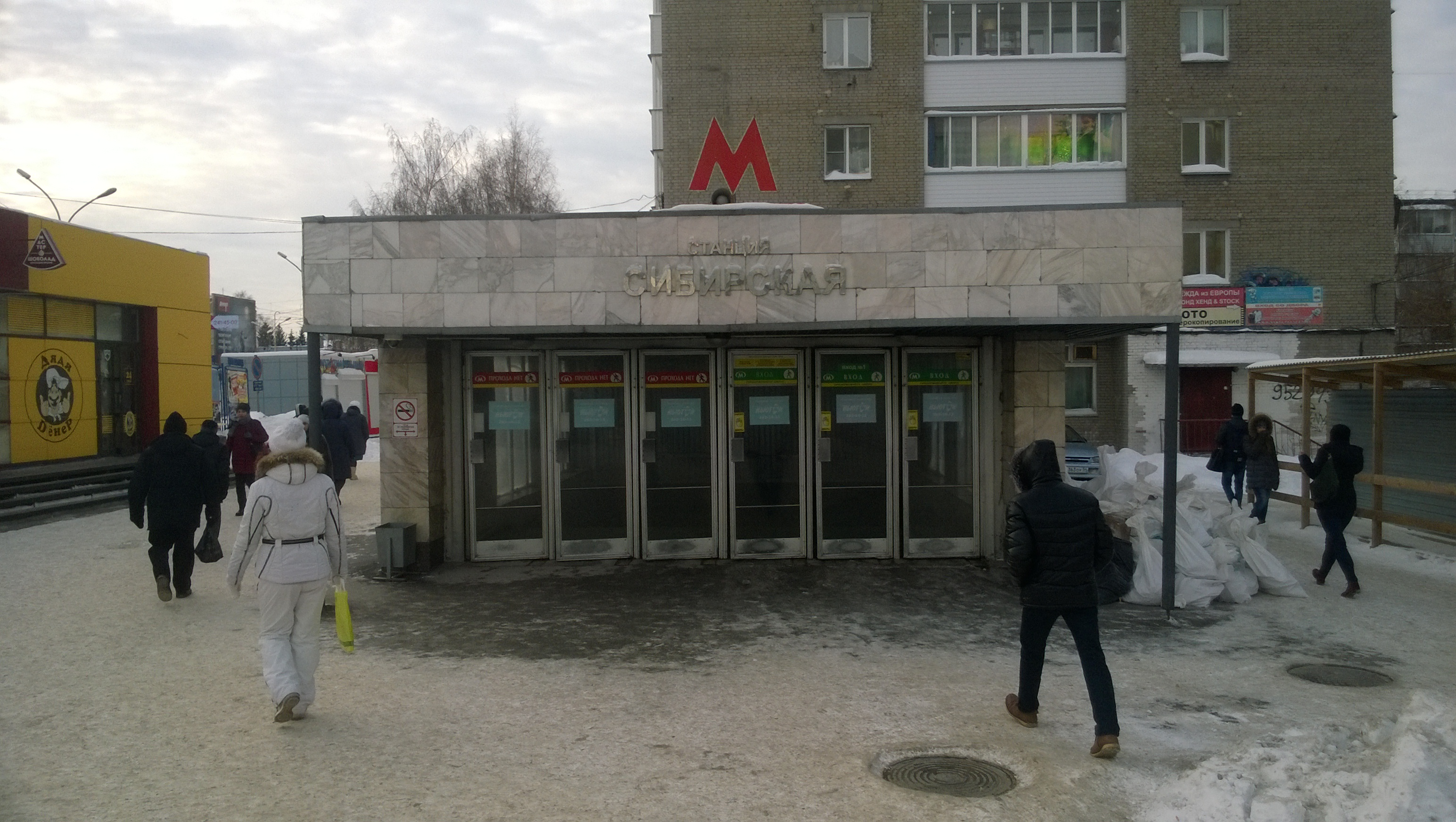
Entrance to Sibirskaya Station. The corner of Michurin and Gogol streets.

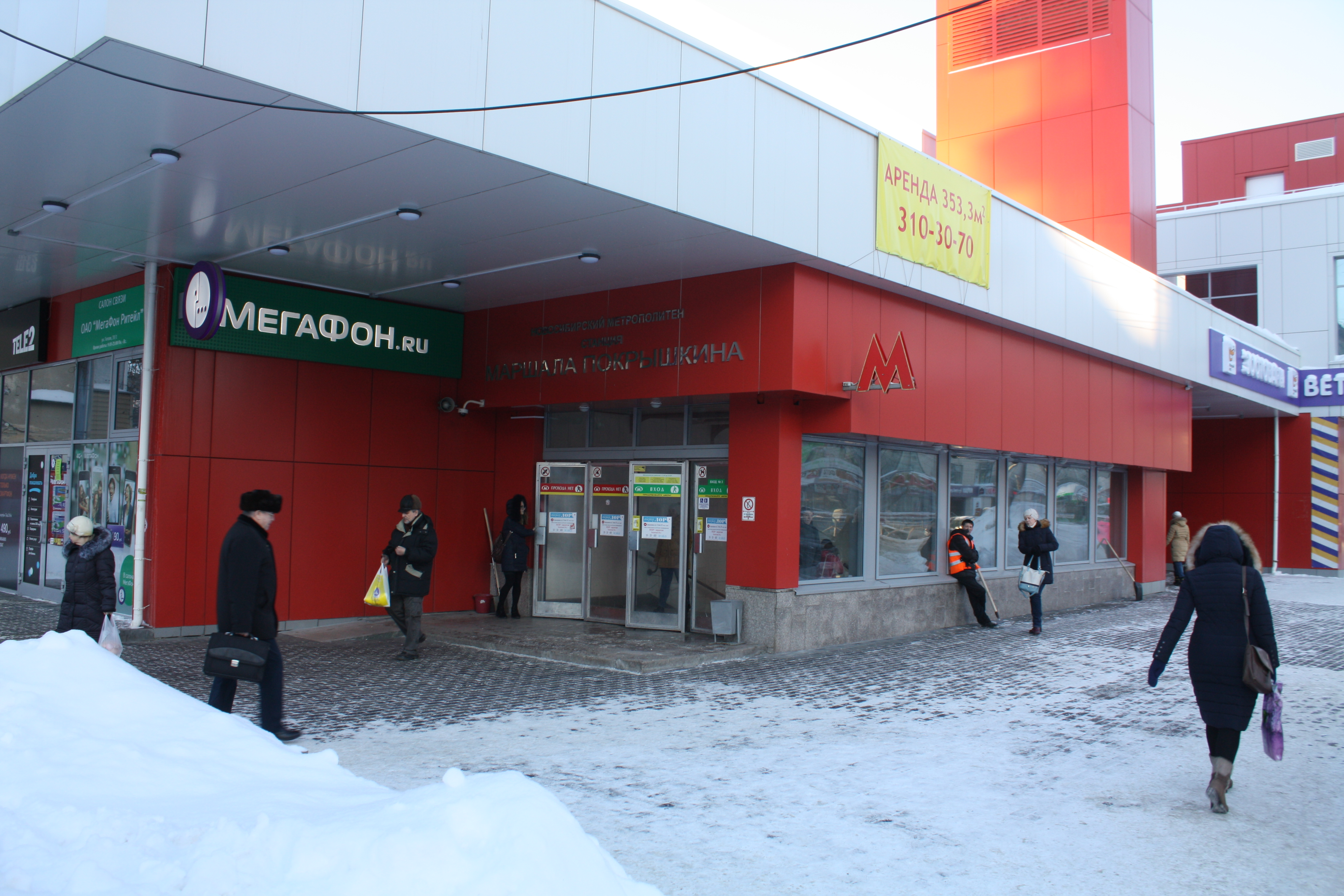
Entrance to Marshala Pokryshkina Station. The corner of Olga Zhilina and Gogol streets

== Notable residents ==
- Andrey Zvyagintsev is a Russian film director and screenwriter.

== See also ==
- Frunze Street
