= Sergey Bagayev (scientist) =

Russian physicist (1941–2024)

- Сергей Багаев
- Born: 9 September 1941; Novosibirsk, Russian SFSR, USSR
- Died: 15 August 2024 (aged 82)
- Awards: Order of Friendship of Peoples

Sergey Nikolayevich Bagayev (Russian: Сергей Николаевич Багаев; 9 September 1941 – 15 August 2024) was a Russian scientist, a specialist in the field of quantum electronics and laser physics, director of the Institute of Laser Physics (1992–2016). His h-index was 16.

== Biography ==
Sergey Bagayev was born in Novosibirsk on 9 September 1941.

In 1964, he graduated from the Faculty of Physics of the Novosibirsk Electrotechnical Institute (NETI).

In 1991, the scientist, together with Veniamin Chebotayev, participated in the creation of the Institute of Laser Physics, and in 1992, he became its director.

He headed departments and taught at Novosibirsk State University, Novosibirsk State Technical University and Moscow Institute of Physics and Technology.

Bagayev died on 15 August 2024, at the age of 82.

== Scientific activity ==
Bagayev discovered new qualitative features of the absorption of laser radiation by a gas at low pressure.

Bagaev's scientific work encompasses optical spectroscopy, laser physics, and quantum electronics. In the field of optical spectroscopy, he has conducted notable experiments on the quantum Doppler Effect. His contributions to laser physics have significantly advanced the discipline, while his expertise in quantum electronics has led to further recognized developments in that domain.

The physicist was a member of the editorial boards of Russian and international journals: Quantum Electronics, Laser Physics, Applied Physics B: Lasers and Optics, Optical Review, Opto-Electronics Letters).

== Awards ==
In 1998, the scientist received the Order of Friendship of Peoples and the State Prize. In 2004, he was made a Chevalier of the Legion of Honor for his outstanding contribution to scientific cooperation between Russia and France. In 2006, Bagayev was awarded the Order "For Merit to the Fatherland" of the IV degree.
