= Novosibirsk Research Institute of Traumatology and Orthopedics =

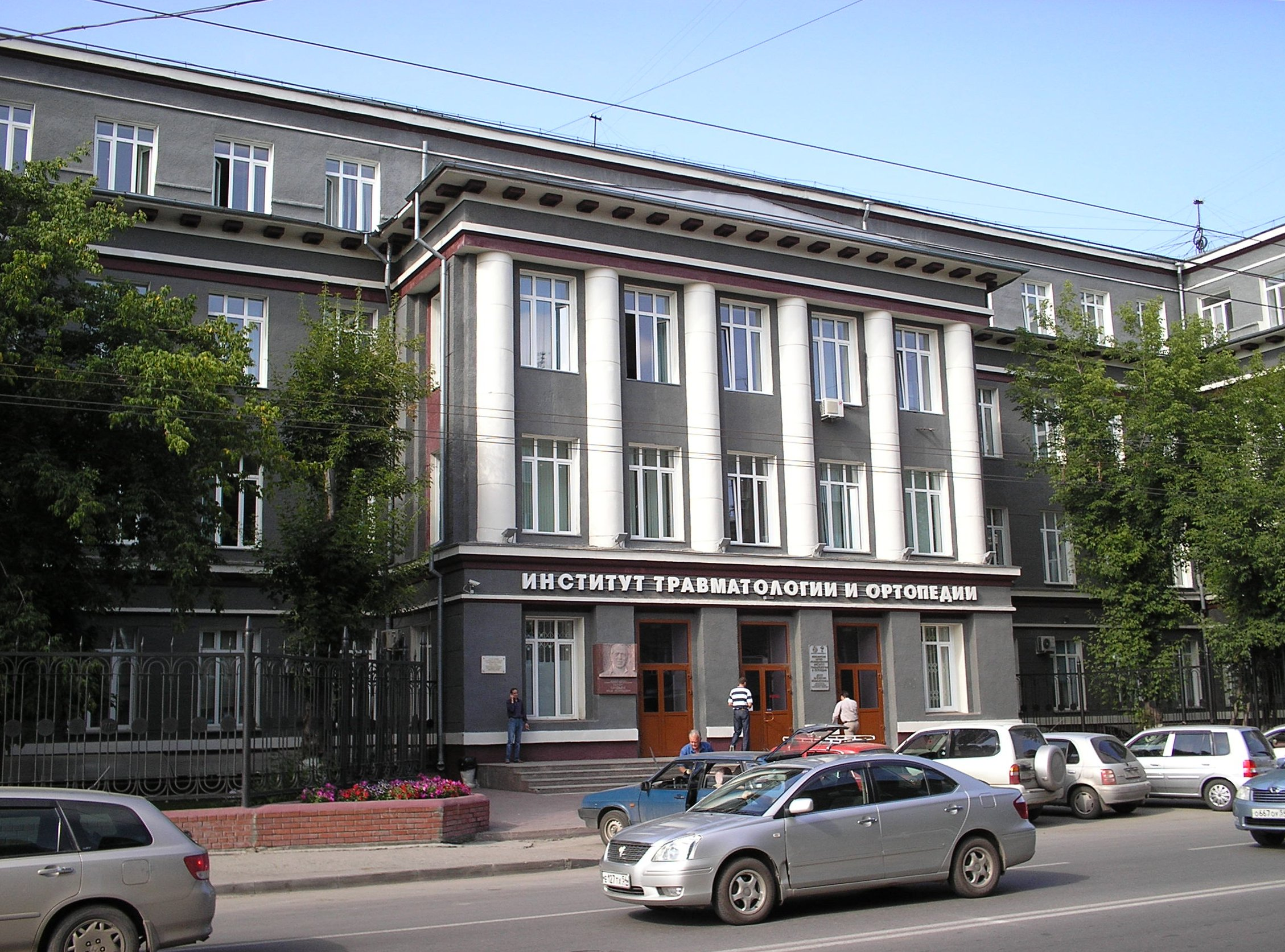

Geography
- Location: Novosibirsk, Russia

History
- Opened: 1946

Links
- Website: www.niito.ru
- Lists: Hospitals in Russia

Novosibirsk Research Institute of Traumatology and Orthopedics named after Y. L. Tsivyan (Russian: Новосибирский научно-исследовательский институт травматологии и ортопедии имени Я. Л. Цивьяна) is a medical organization in Novosibirsk, Russia, that specializes in orthopedic surgery, the treatment of rheumatologic conditions and scientific research of diseases of the musculoskeletal system. It was founded in 1946.

== History ==
The medical organization was created in 1946 on the basis of evacuation hospital No. 1239, which was located in the building of the Bookselling Technical School on Frunze Street. Initially, the institute specialized in the surgical treatment of people who received injuries during the Second World War.

In 2015, for the first time in Russia, the institute's doctors implanted nanoceramic hip joint implant made in Russia. A hip joint prosthesis was implanted free of charge to a resident of Birobidzhan.

== See also ==
- Meshalkin National Medical Research Center

== Bibliography ==
- Ламин В. А. (2003). Энциклопедия. Новосибирск. Новосибирск: Новосибирское книжное издательство. p. 378. ISBN 5-7620-0968-8.
