= Michurin Street, Novosibirsk =

Street in Novosibirsk, Russia

Michurin Street
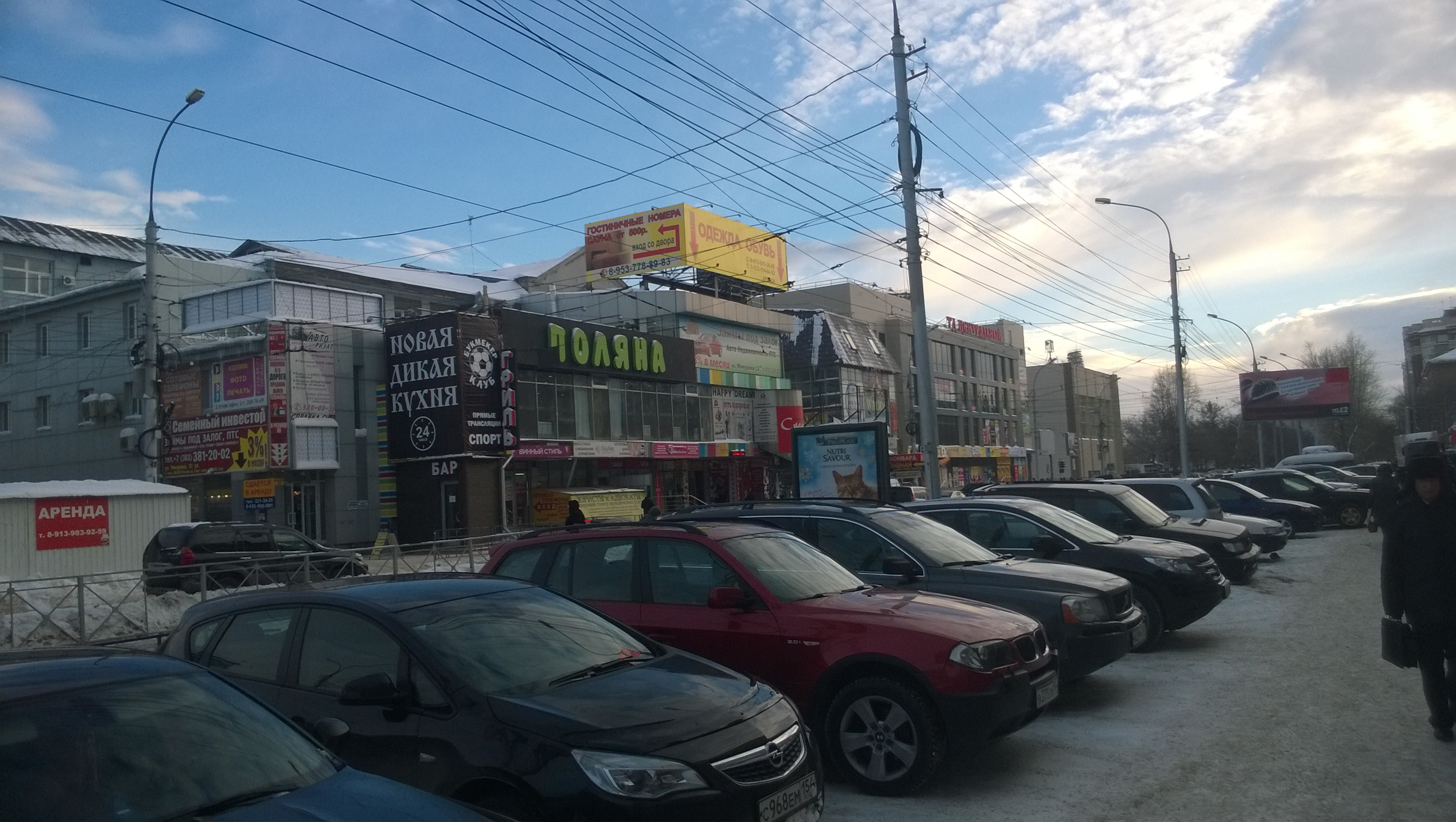
- Interactive map of Michurin Street
- Native name: Улица Мичурина (Russian)
- Location: Novosibirsk; Russia
- Nearest metro station: Sibirskaya

Michurin Street (Russian: Улица Мичурина) is a street in Tsentralny City District of Novosibirsk, Russia. It runs south-north. The street starts from Ordzhonikidze Street opposite the Novosibirsk Opera and Ballet Theatre, crosses Yadrintsevskaya, Frunze, Krylov, Gogol streets and then forms a T-intersection with Pisarev Street.

== History ==
The street was previously called the Alexandrovskaya Street, but was renamed in 1920 for Fyodor Serebrennikov, Russian revolutionary.

In the early 1930s, the construction of the Opera and Ballet Theatre began. The new building divided the street into two parts: the name of the southern part has not changed, the northern part was named Michurin Street.

== Gallery ==
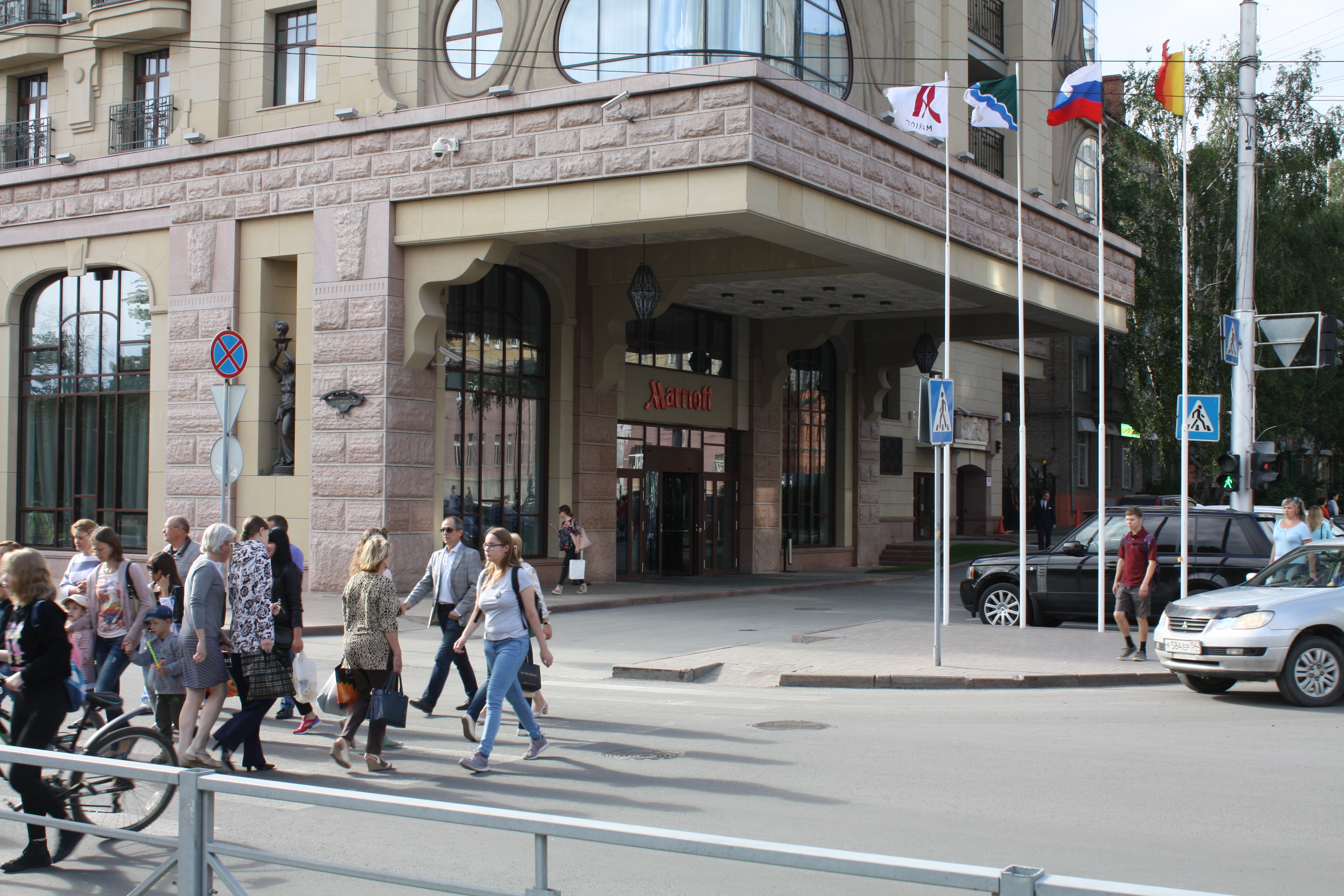
T-intersection of Ordzhonikidze and Michurin streets

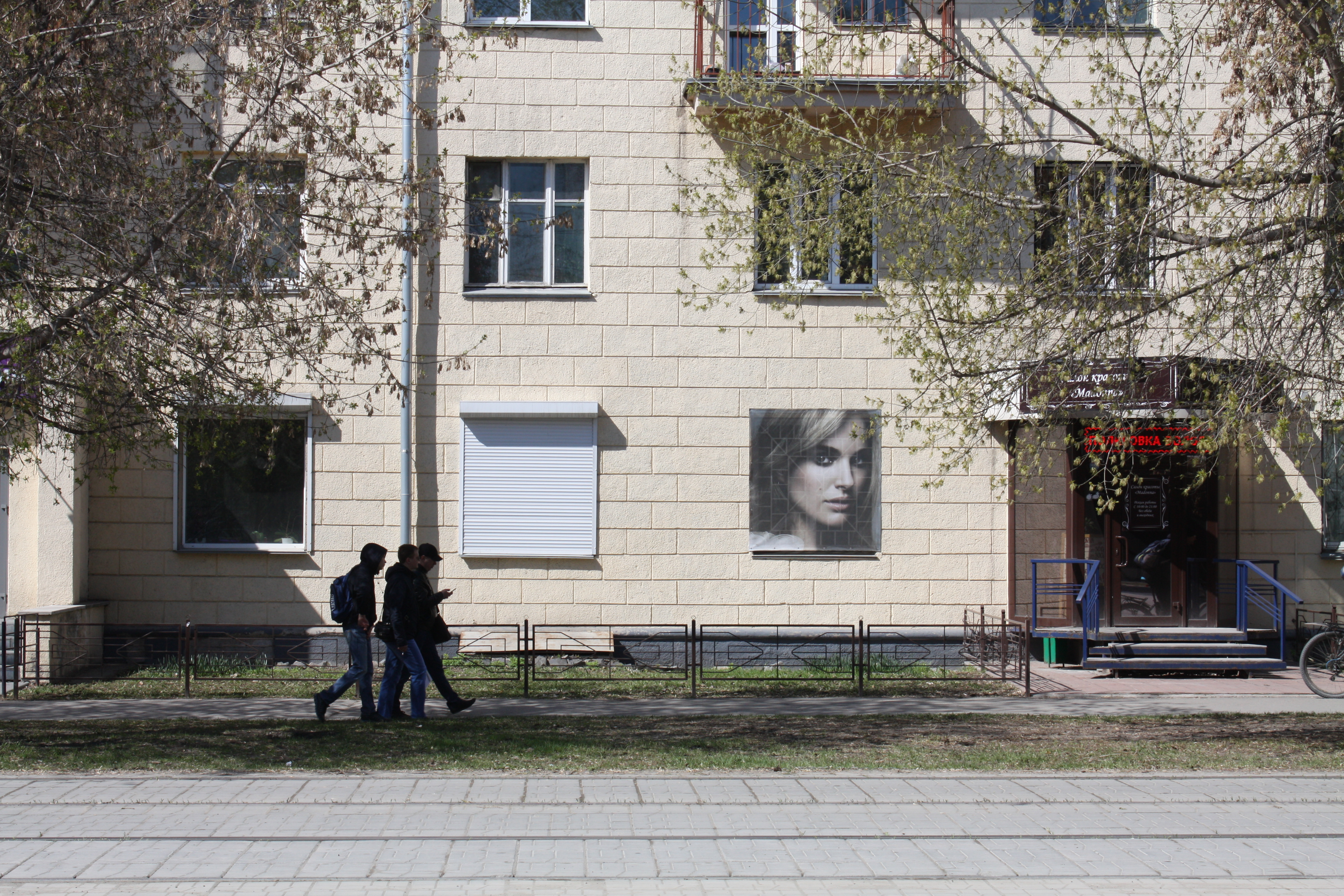

== Architecture ==
- Michurin Street 6. The building was probably built in 1900.
- Novosibirsk Marriott Hotel. It is located on the corner of Michurin and Ordzhonikidze streets. The hotel was opened in 2014.
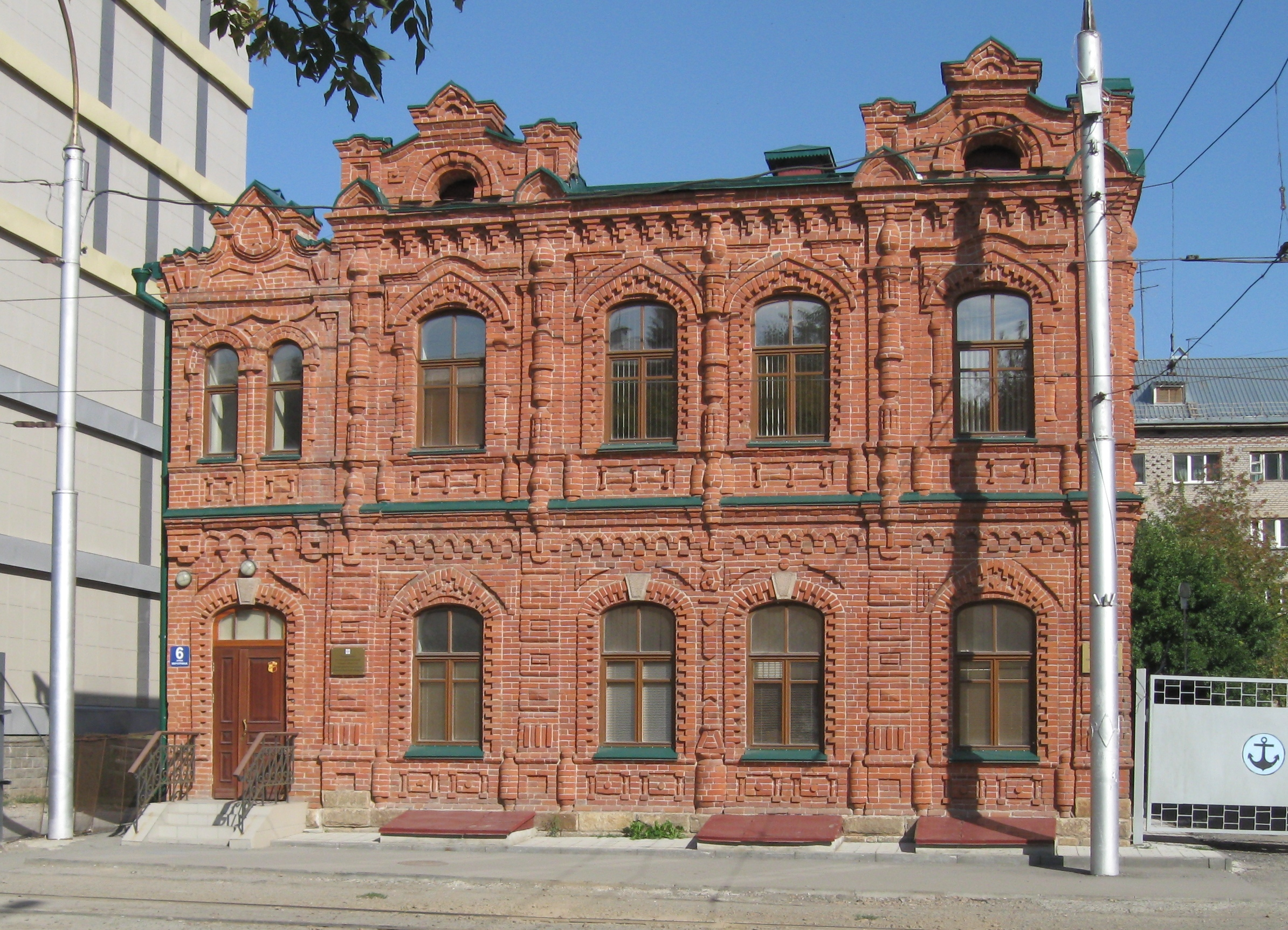
Michurin Street 6

== Sports ==
=== Sports clubs ===
- FC Sibir Novosibirsk
- WBC Dynamo Novosibirsk

=== Sports objects ===
- Spartak Stadium

== Transportation ==
=== Tram ===
Two tram stops are located on the street: 'Stadion Spartak', 'Magazin 1000 melochei'.

=== Metro ===
Sibirskaya Station is located on the street.

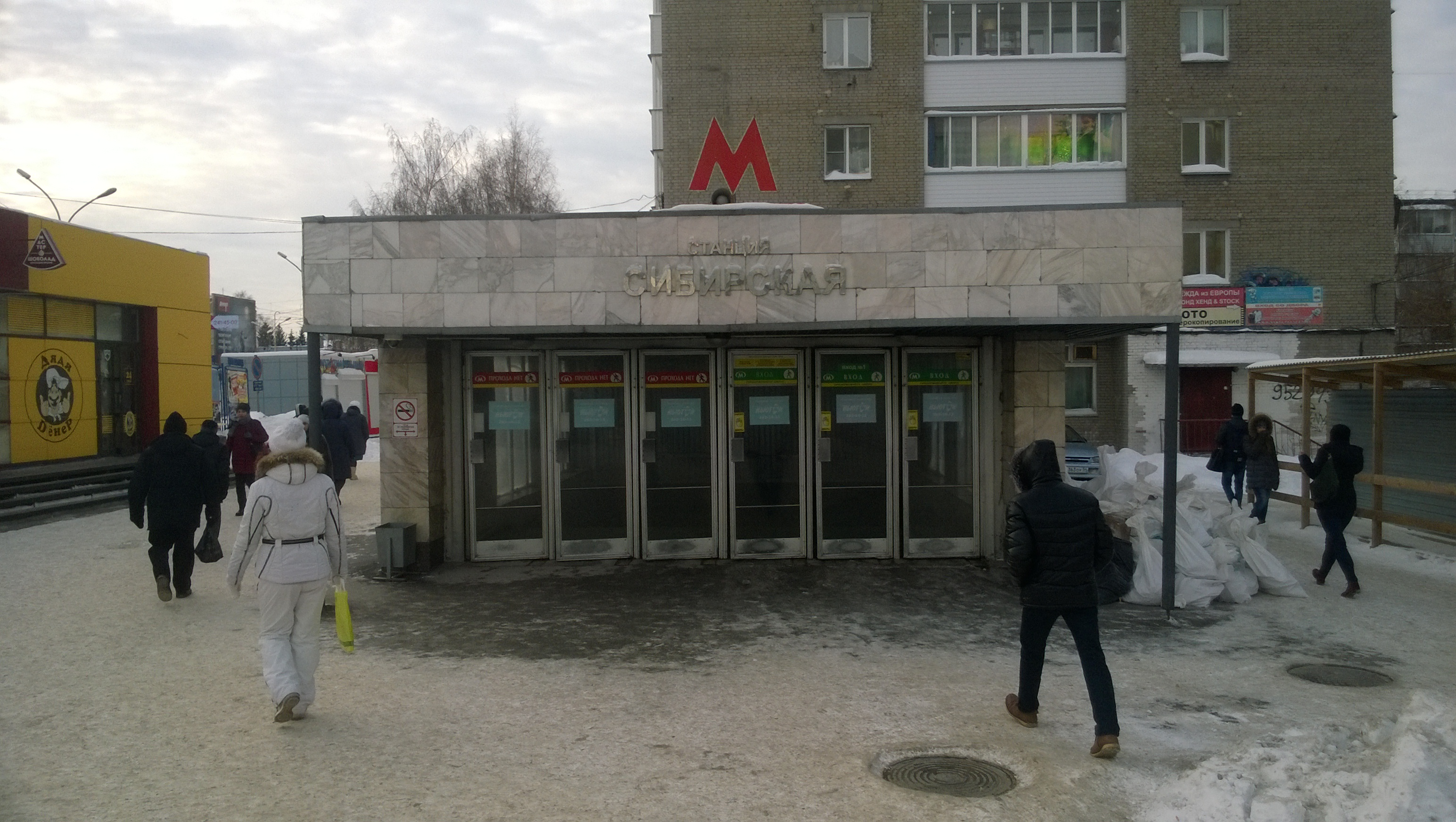
Entrance to Sibirskaya Station. The corner of Michurin and Gogol streets.
