= Meshalkin National Medical Research Center =

Geography
- Location: Novosibirsk, Russia

History
- Founded: 1957

Links
- Lists: Hospitals in Russia

Meshalkin National Medical Research Center (Russian: Национальный медицинский исследовательский центр имени академика Е. Н. Мешалкина) is a research and hospital institution in Sovetsky District of Novosibirsk, Russia. It was founded in 1957. The organisation is one of the largest Russian hospital for the treatment of cardiovascular diseases.

== History ==
In 1957, the Institute of Experimental Biology and Medicine was established. It was headed by Moscow surgeon Evgeny Meshalkin. In 2008, the institute was named after Academician Evgeny Meshalkin.

== See also ==
- Novosibirsk Research Institute of Traumatology and Orthopedics
