= Fraules Dance Centre =

- 204g Gogol Street, Novosibirsk; Russia

Information
- Type: Dance school
- Established: 2010

Fraules Dance Centre is a dance school, located in Novosibirsk, Russia. It was established in 2010.

== History ==
Dance school was founded in Novosibirsk by Elena Yatkina. First the school was called Indigo Dance Centre, then Elena renamed it Fraules. In May 2014, the Novosibirsk school visited Danielle Polanco.

== Dance direction ==
Dancehall, vogue, hip-hop, house, popping, twerking, break dance, jazz-funk, stretching, locking, contemporary, classical dance.
