= Dzerzhinsky District, Novosibirsk =

Dzerzhinsky City District
- District
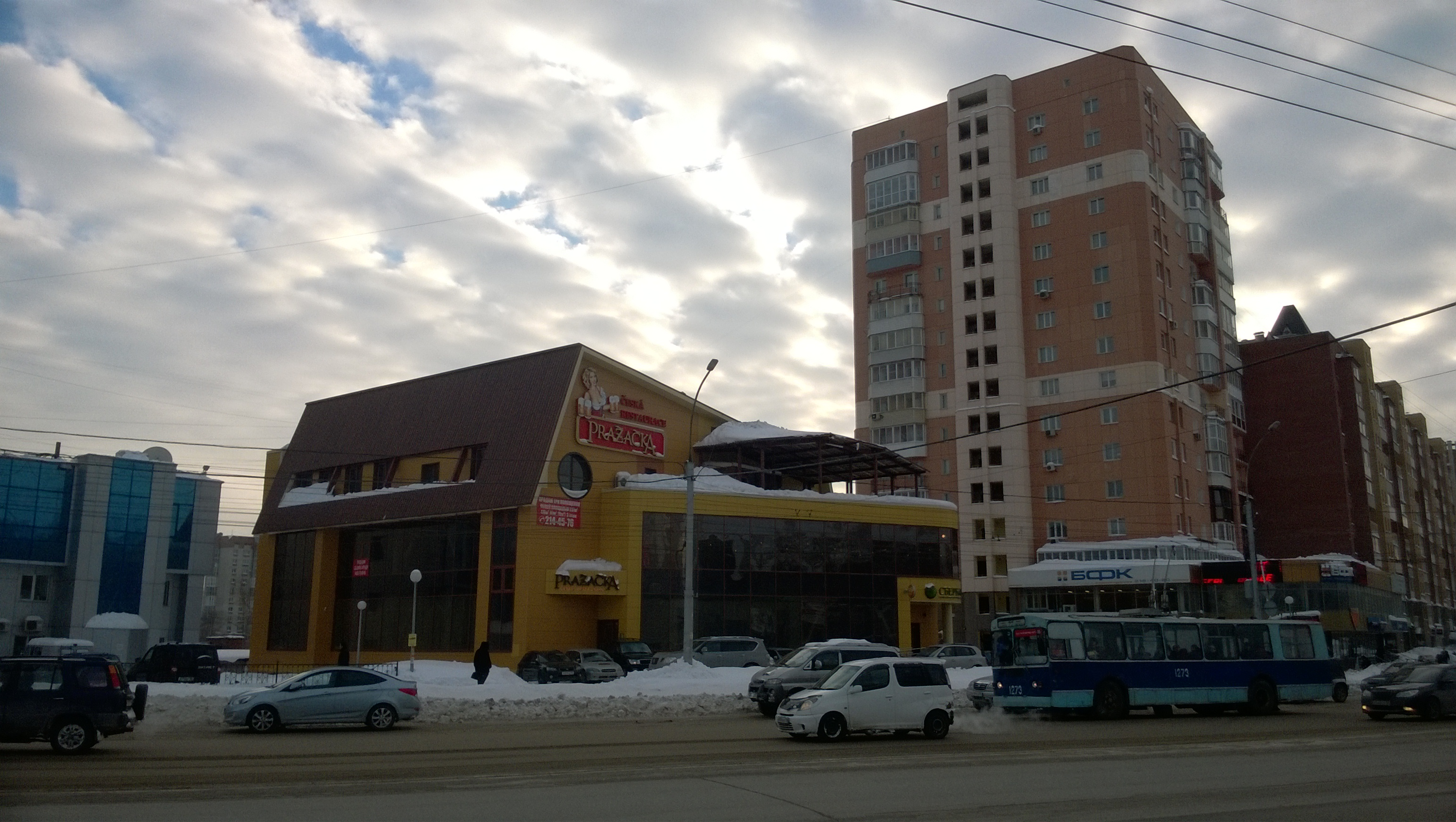

- Coat of arms
- Location of Dzerzhinsky City District
- Coordinates: 55°04′00″N 83°00′00″E
- Country: Russia
- Federal subject: Novosibirsk
- Established: 1 October 1933

Area
  - Total: 36.51 km^{2} (14.10 sq mi)

Dzerzhinsky City District (Russian: Дзержинский район) is an administrative district (raion), one of the 10 raions of Novosibirsk, Russia. The area of the district is 36,51 km^{2} (14.10 sq mi). Population: 174,360 (2018 Census).

== History ==
In 1933, the Dzerzhinsky District was established.

In 1980, part of the Dzerzhinsky City District became the Kalininsky City Distinct.

== Geography ==
=== Bodies of water ===
- Kamenka River

== Architecture ==
=== Soviet architecture ===
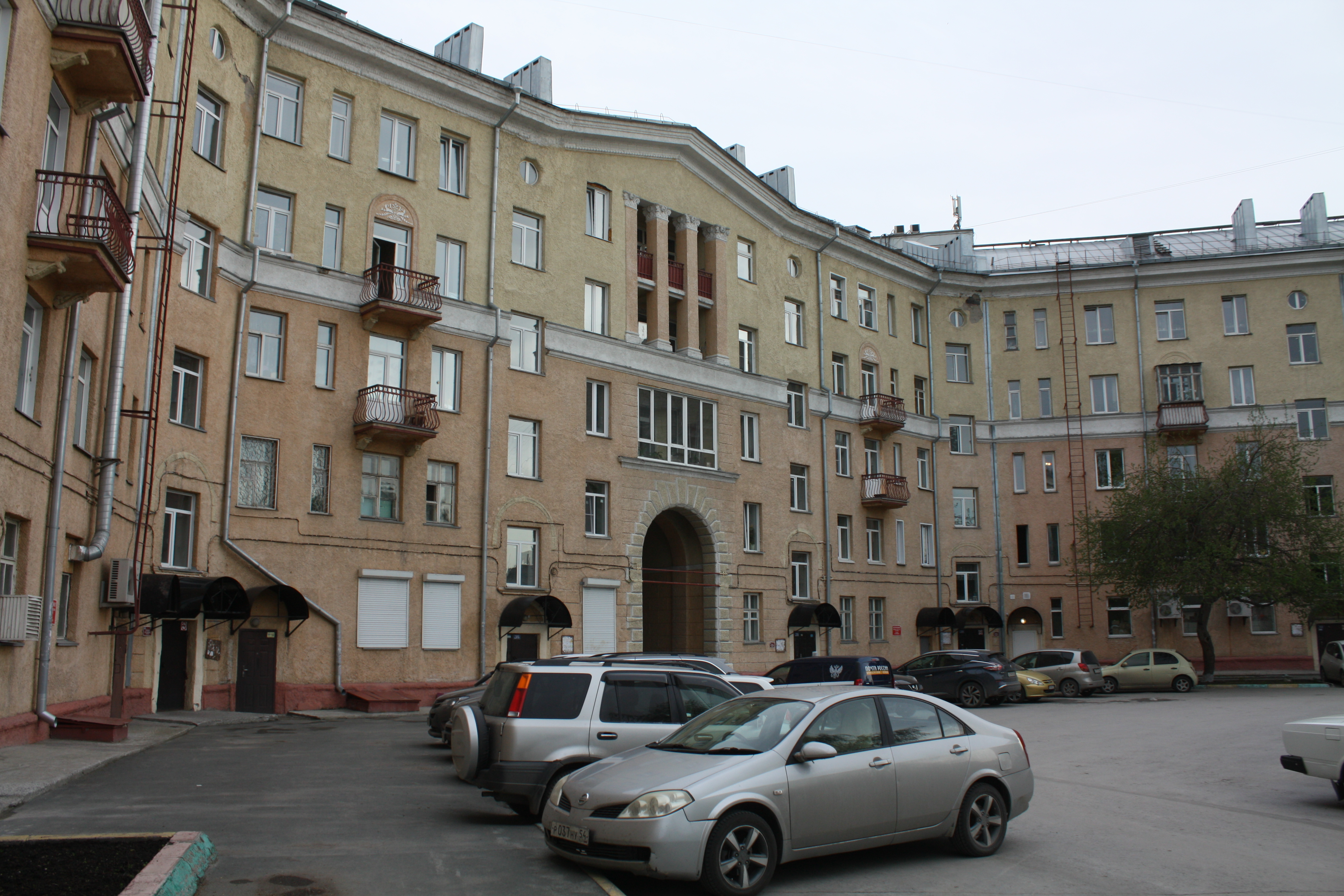

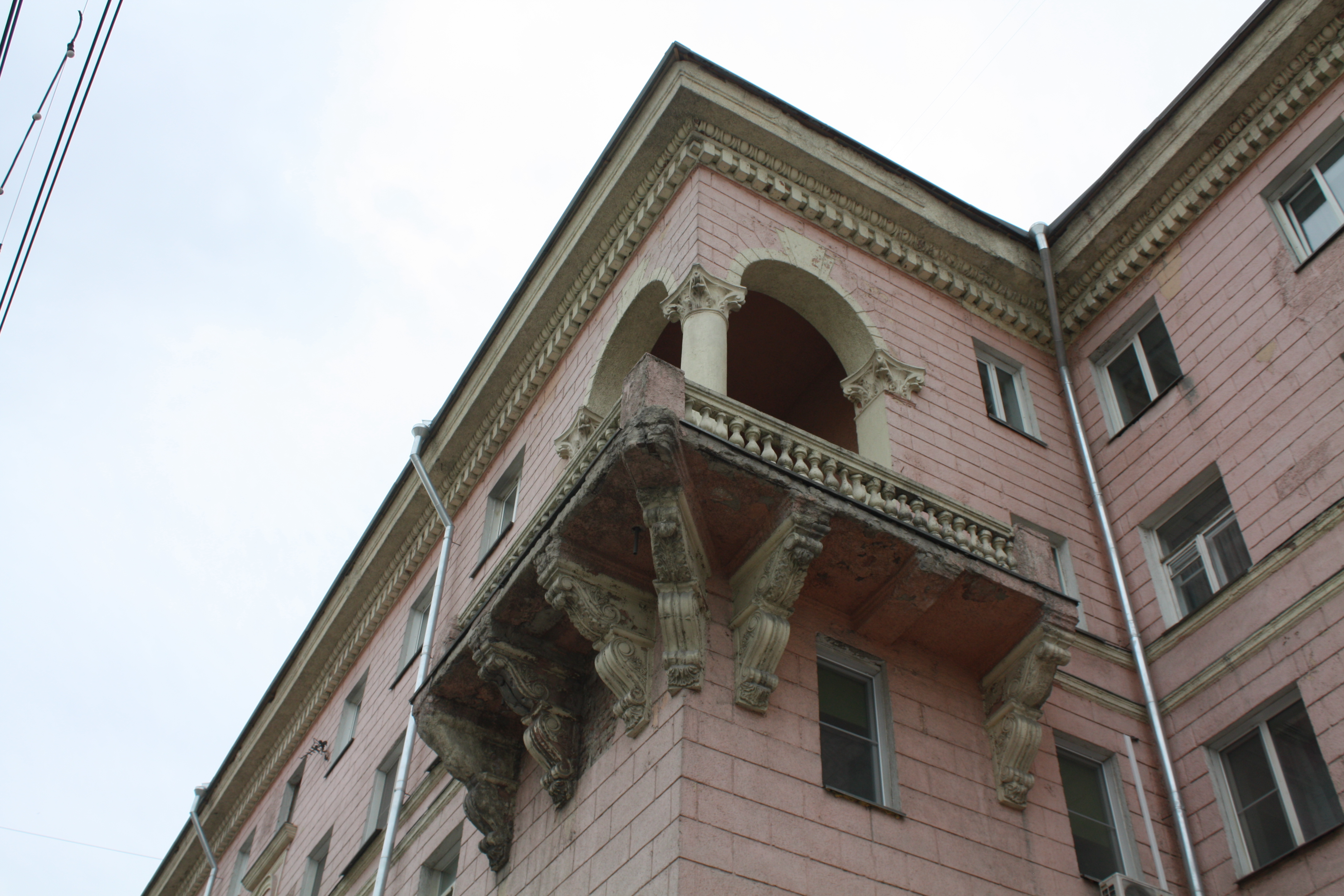

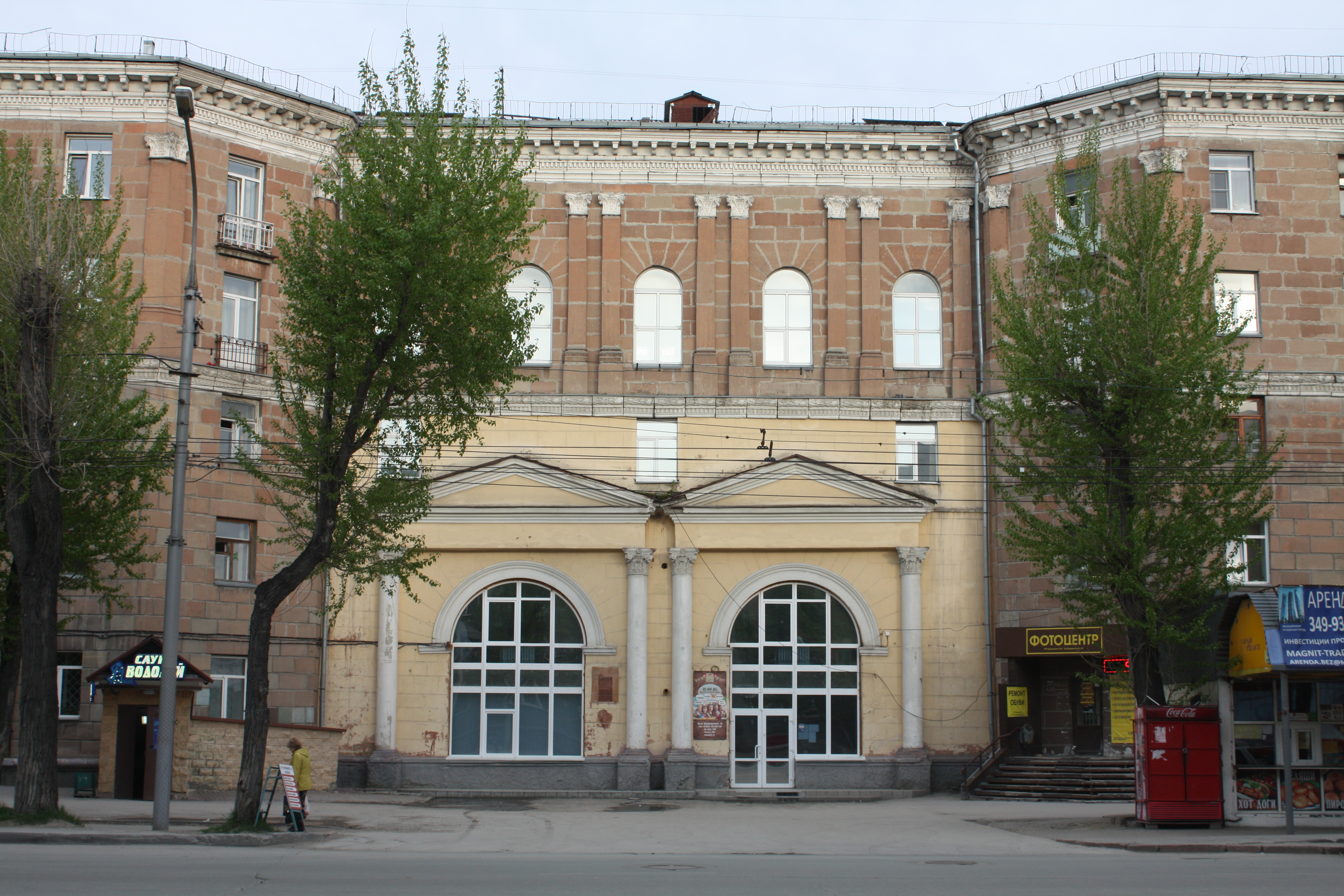

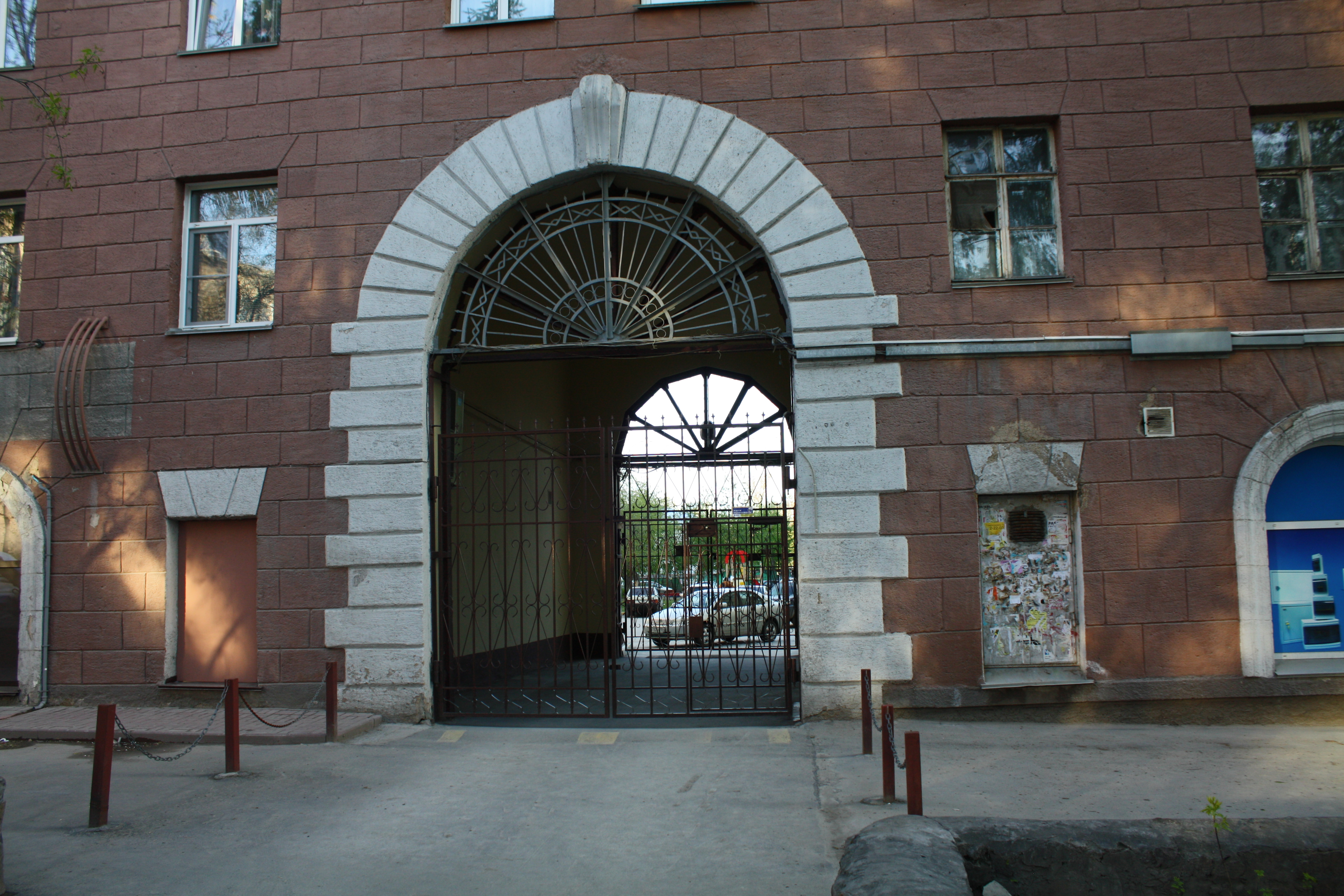

== Parks ==
=== Beryozovaya Roshcha ===
Beryozovaya Roshcha is a park, established in 1963. Its area is 30 hectares.

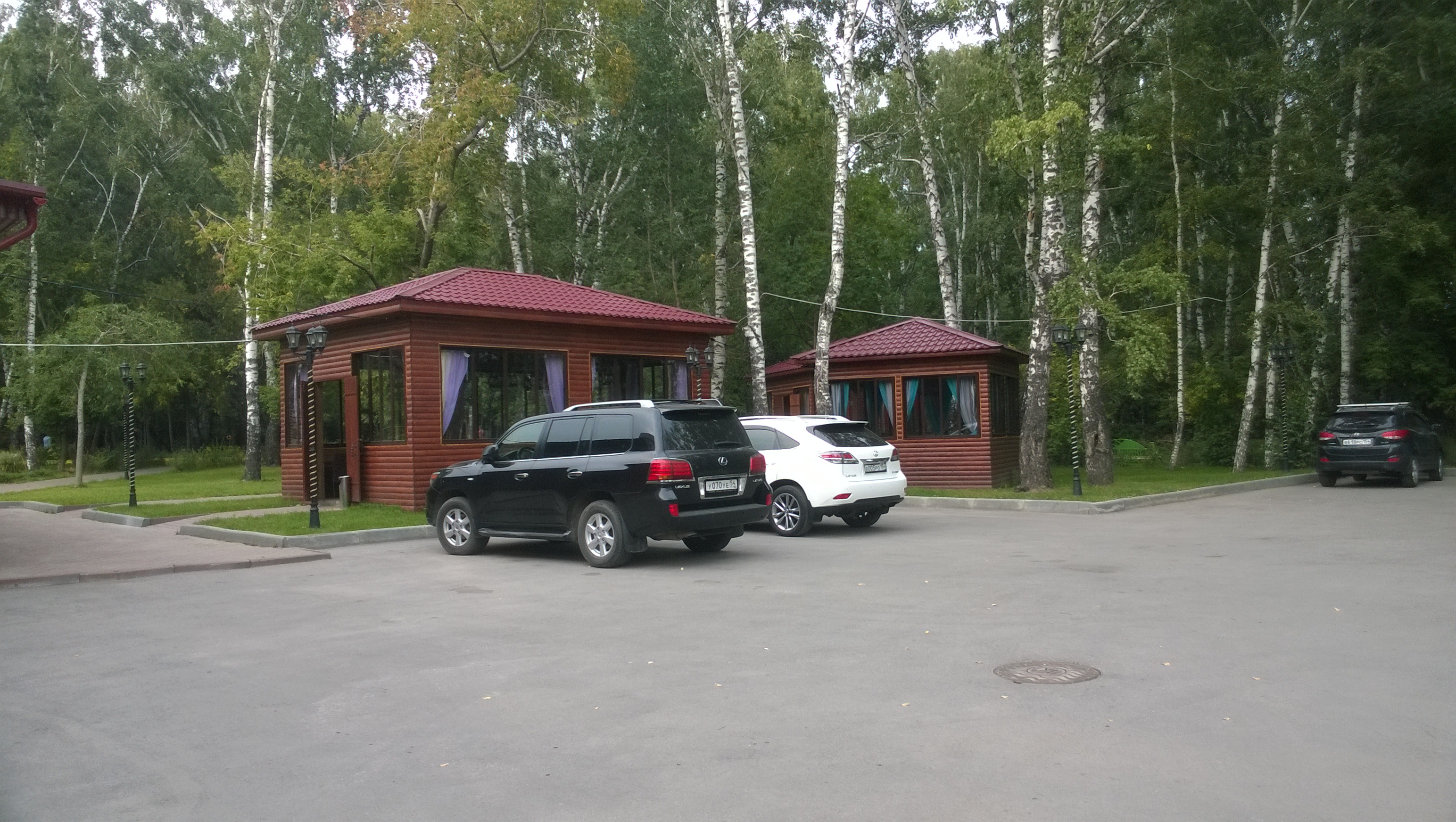

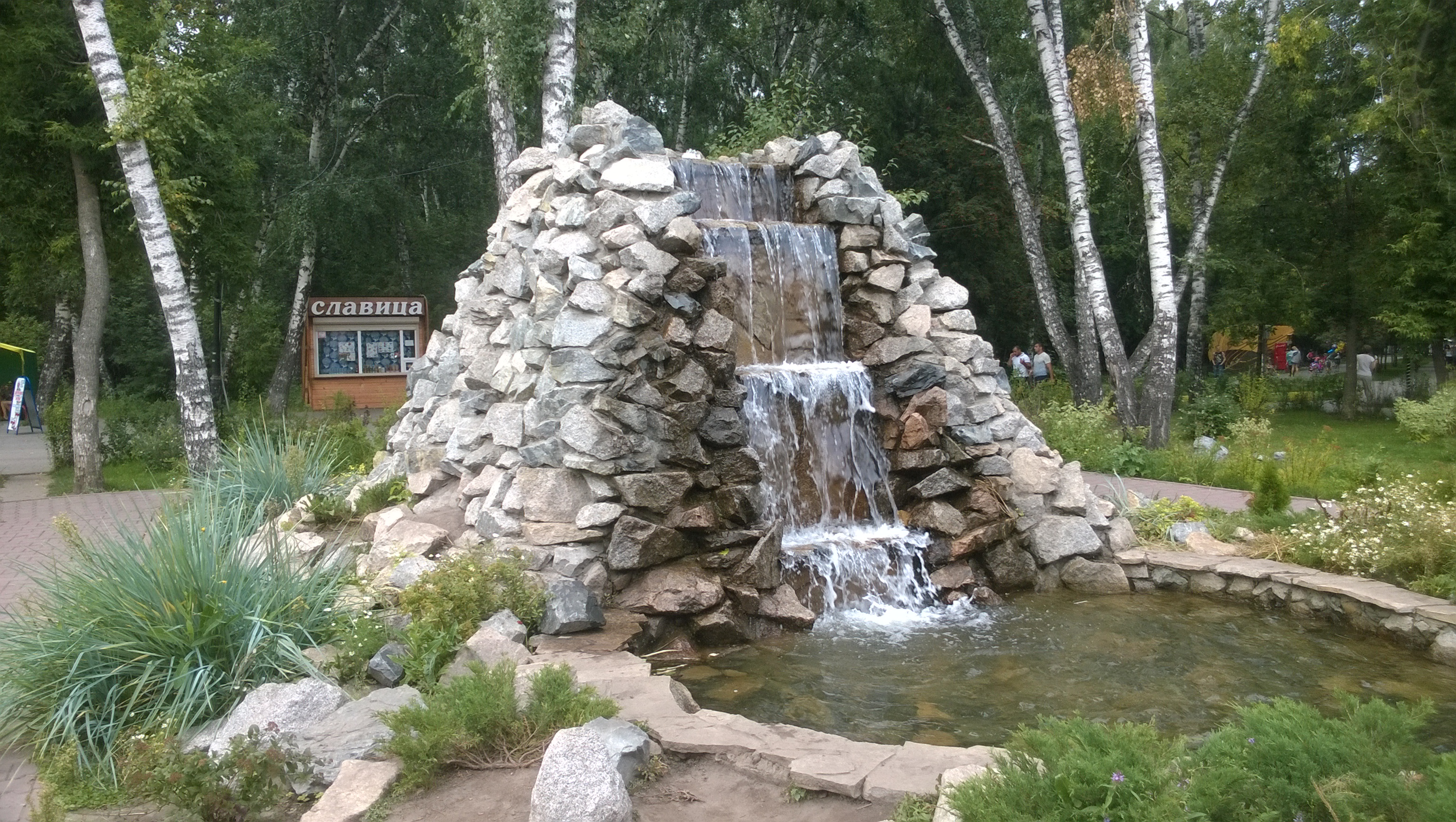

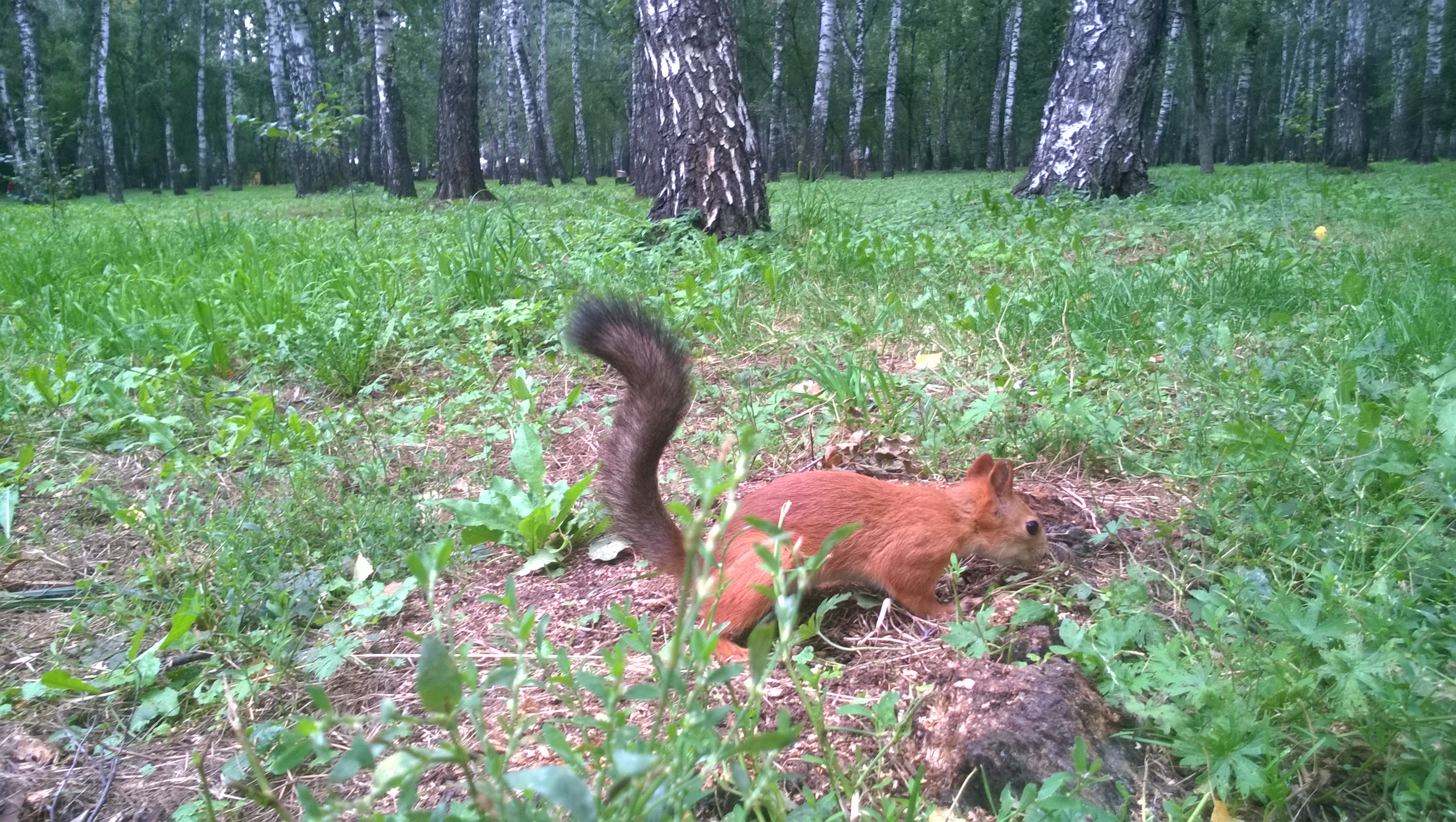

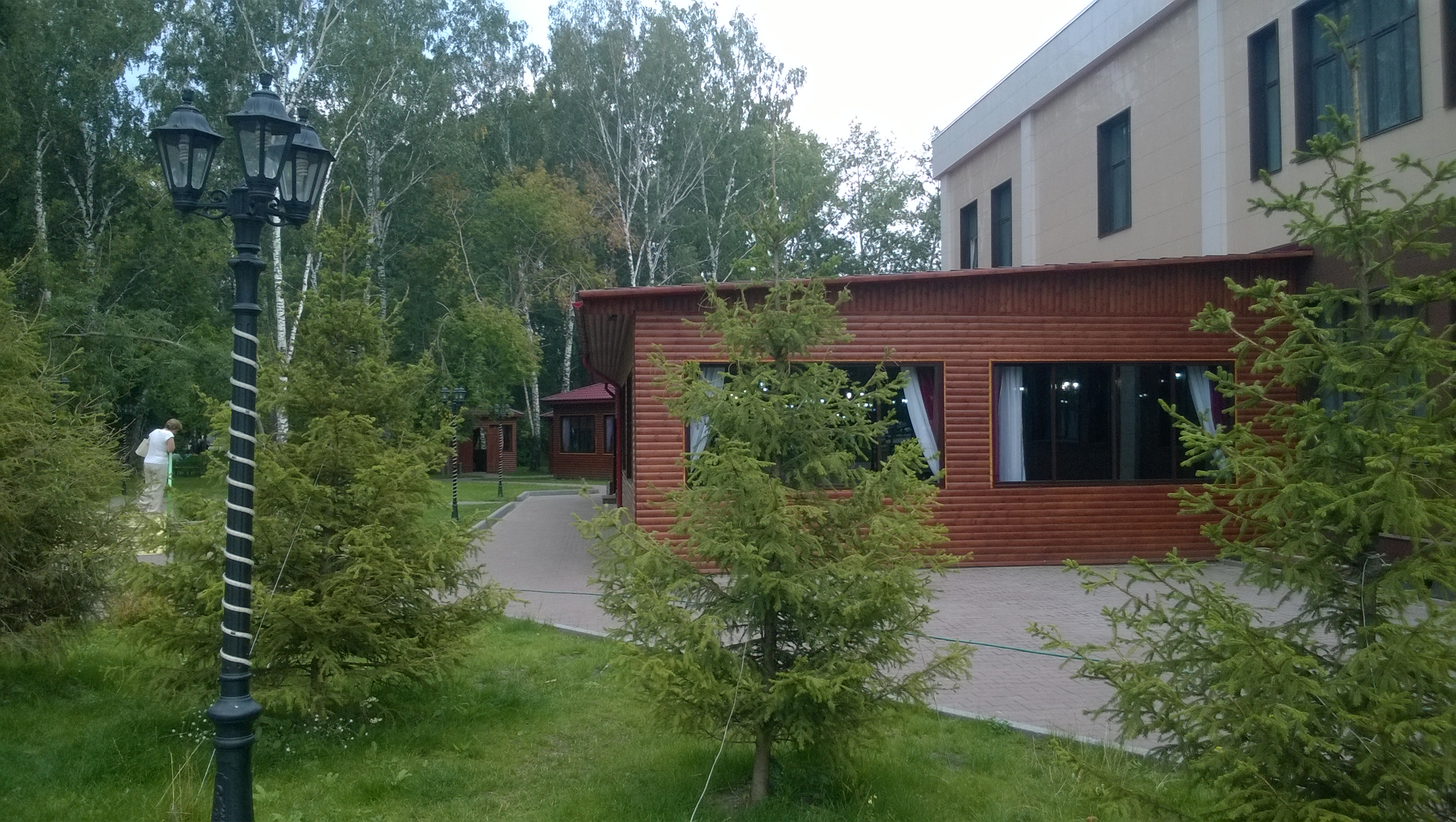

=== Dzerzhinsky Park ===
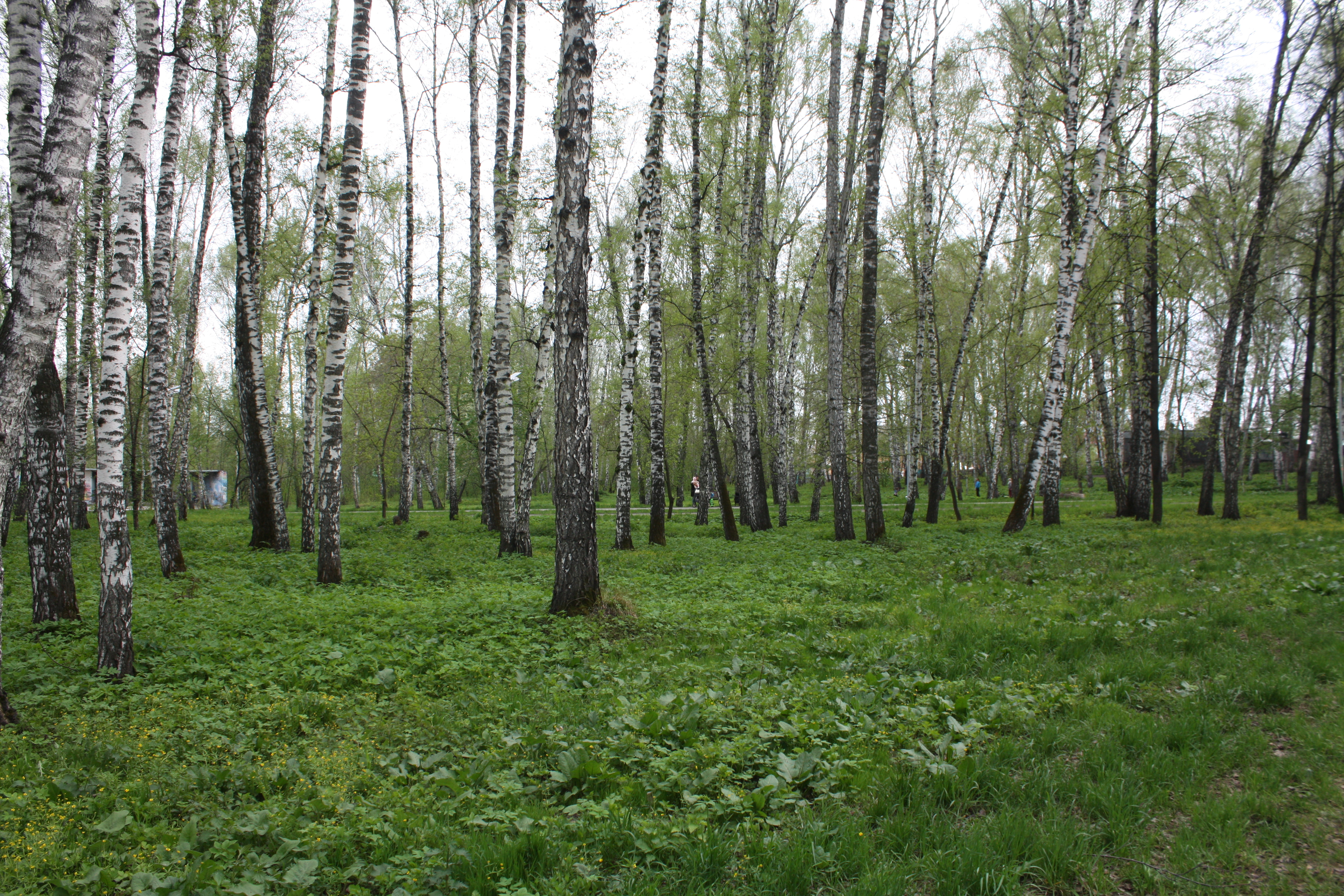

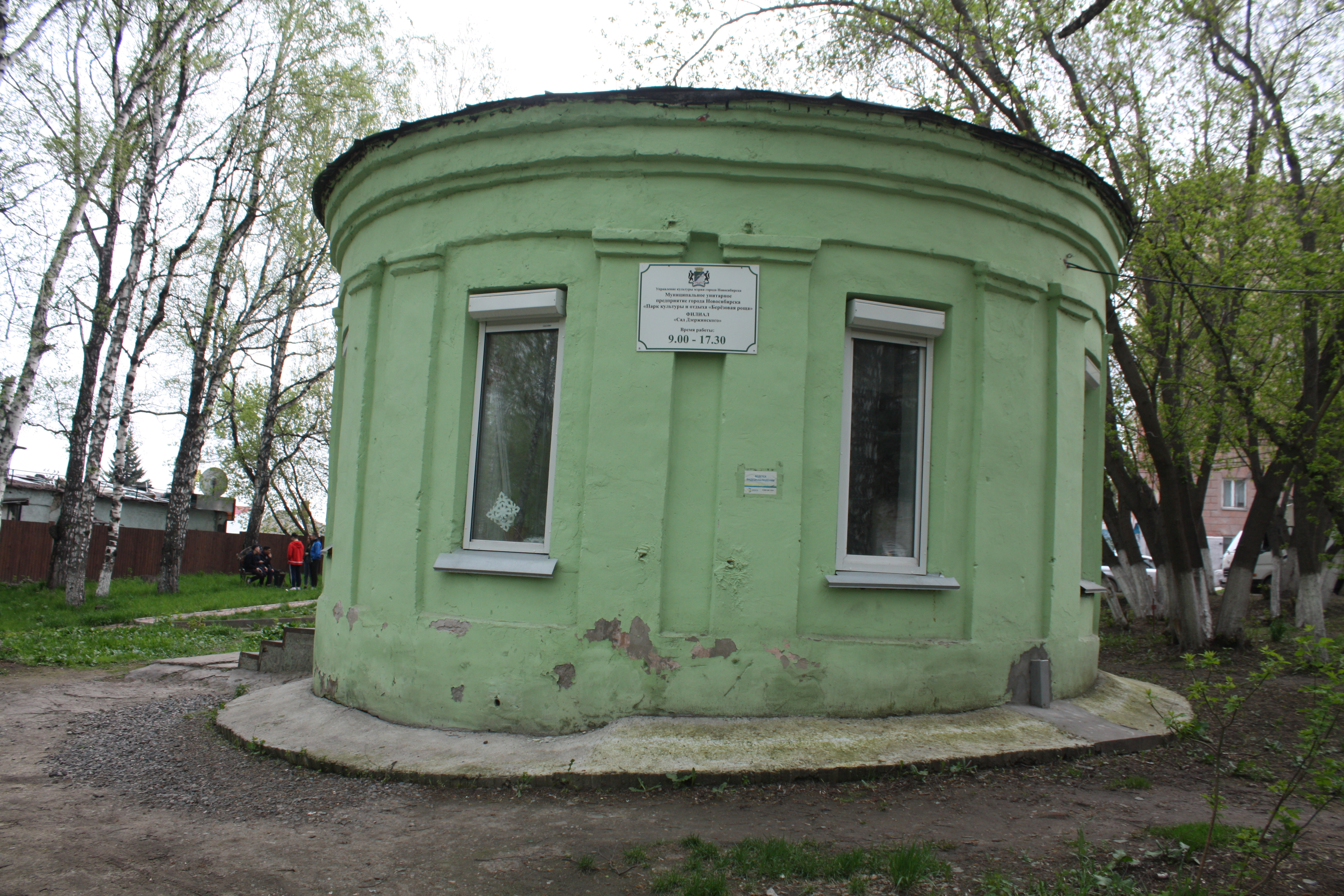

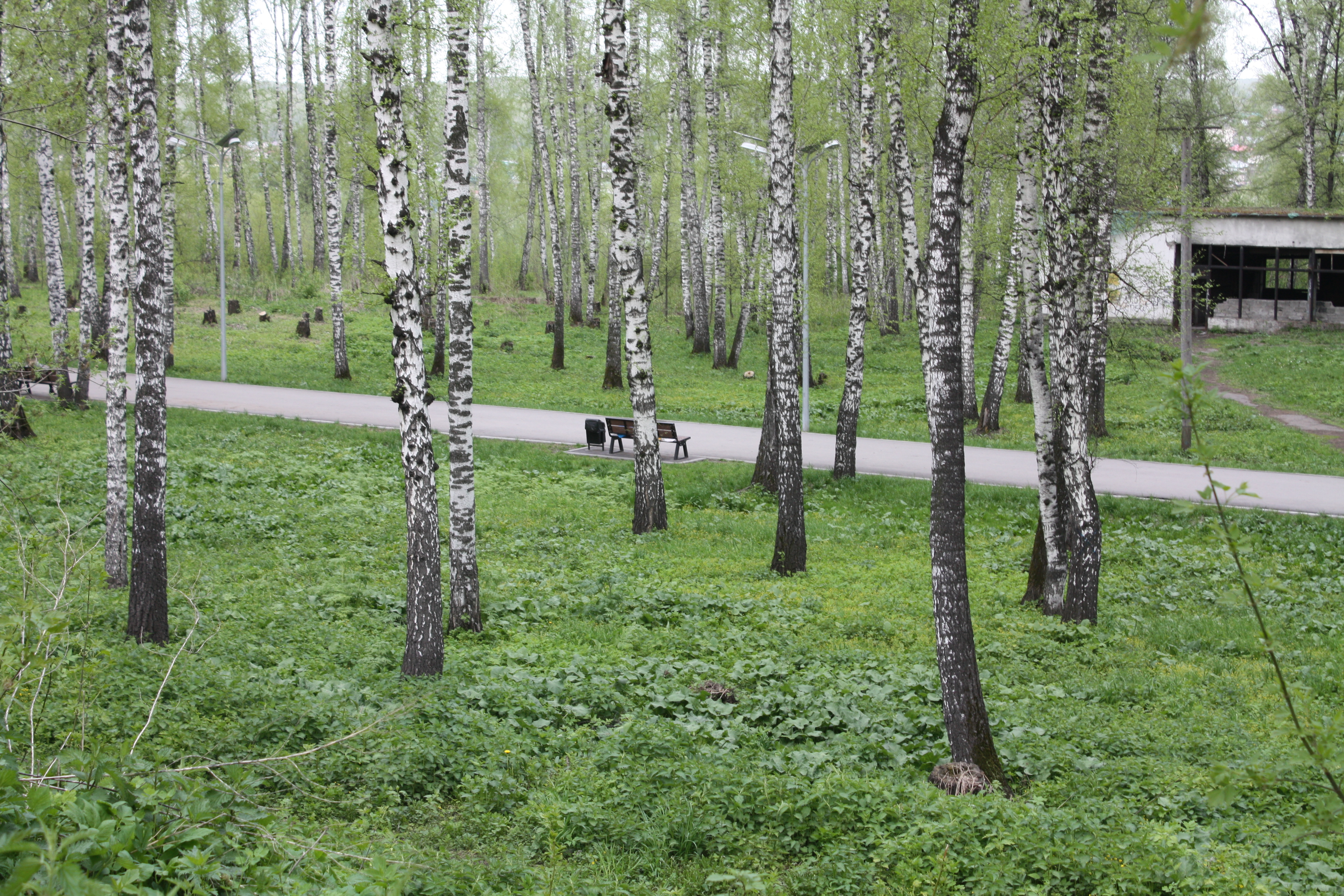

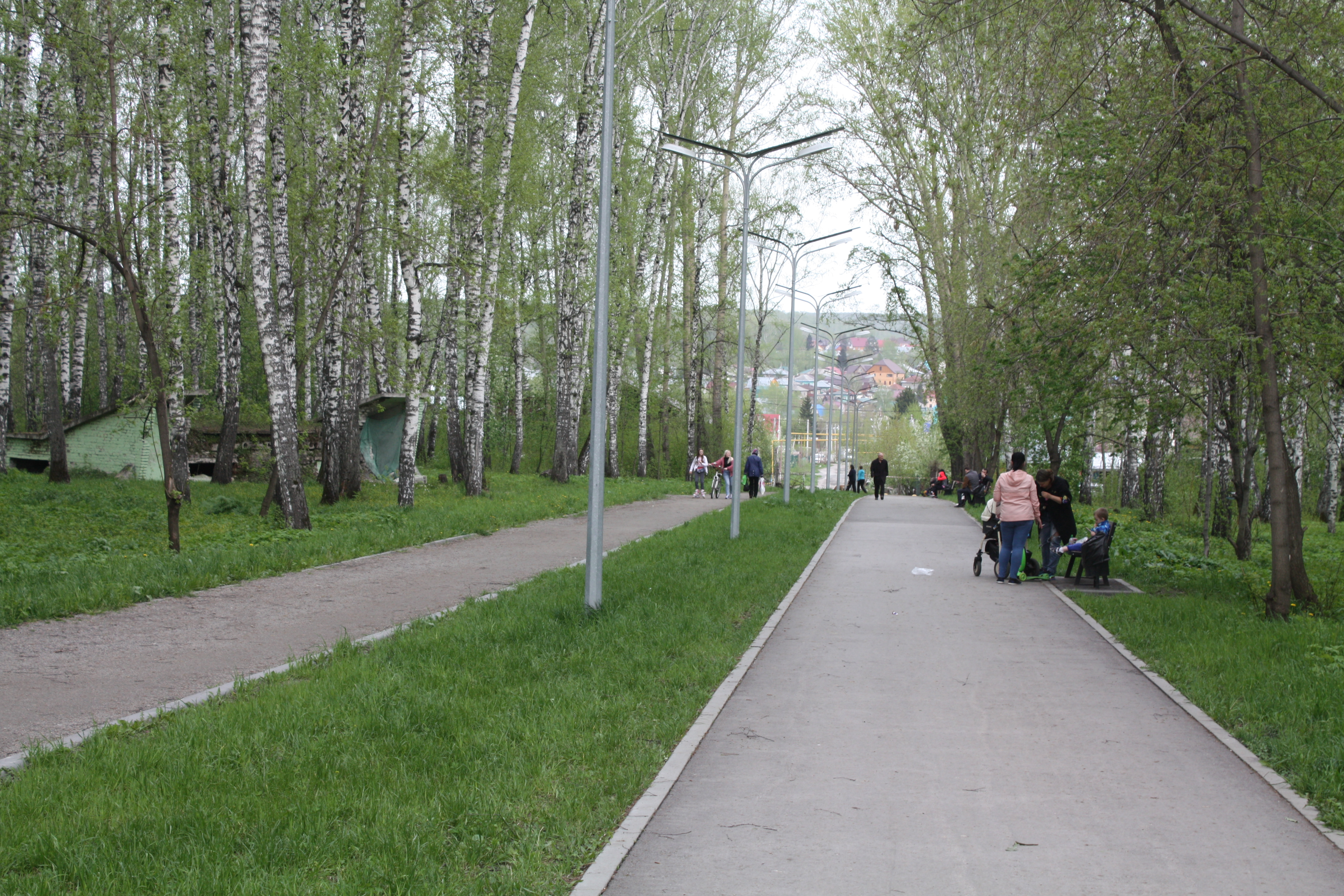

== Science and education ==
=== Research Institutes ===
- Chaplygin Siberian Scientific Research Institute Of Aviation

=== Educational institutions ===
- Novosibirsk Construction and Assembly College
- Novosibirsk Radio Engineering College
- College of Light Industry and Service
- Kondratyuk Aerospace Lyceum

=== Libraries ===
- Chklov Library
- Gashek Library
- Gogol Library
- Ostrovsky Library
- Tsvetayeva Library
- Turgenev Library

== Culture ==
=== Cultural organizations ===
- Children's House of Culture named after Kalinin
- Eurasia (concert and theatrical center)
- Palace of Culture named after Chkalov
- Tochmashovets House of Culture

=== Dance ===
- Fraules Dance Centre is a dance school of Elena Yatkina.

== Sports ==
- Chkalovets Stadium
- Novosibirsk Biathlon Complex is a sports complex in the east of the district.

== Economy ==
=== Companies ===
- Novosibirsk Aircraft Production Association. Its produces Su-34 fighter-bombers, An-38-120 regional passenger aircraft. The company also involved in the Sukhoi Superjet 100 program.
- Maskulo is a fetish clothing company for men founded in 2014.

== Transportations ==
=== Railway ===
Novosibirsk-Vostochny Railway Station is located in the district.

=== Metro ===
Two Novosibirsk Metro stations are located in the district: Beryozovaya Roshcha and Zolotaya Niva.

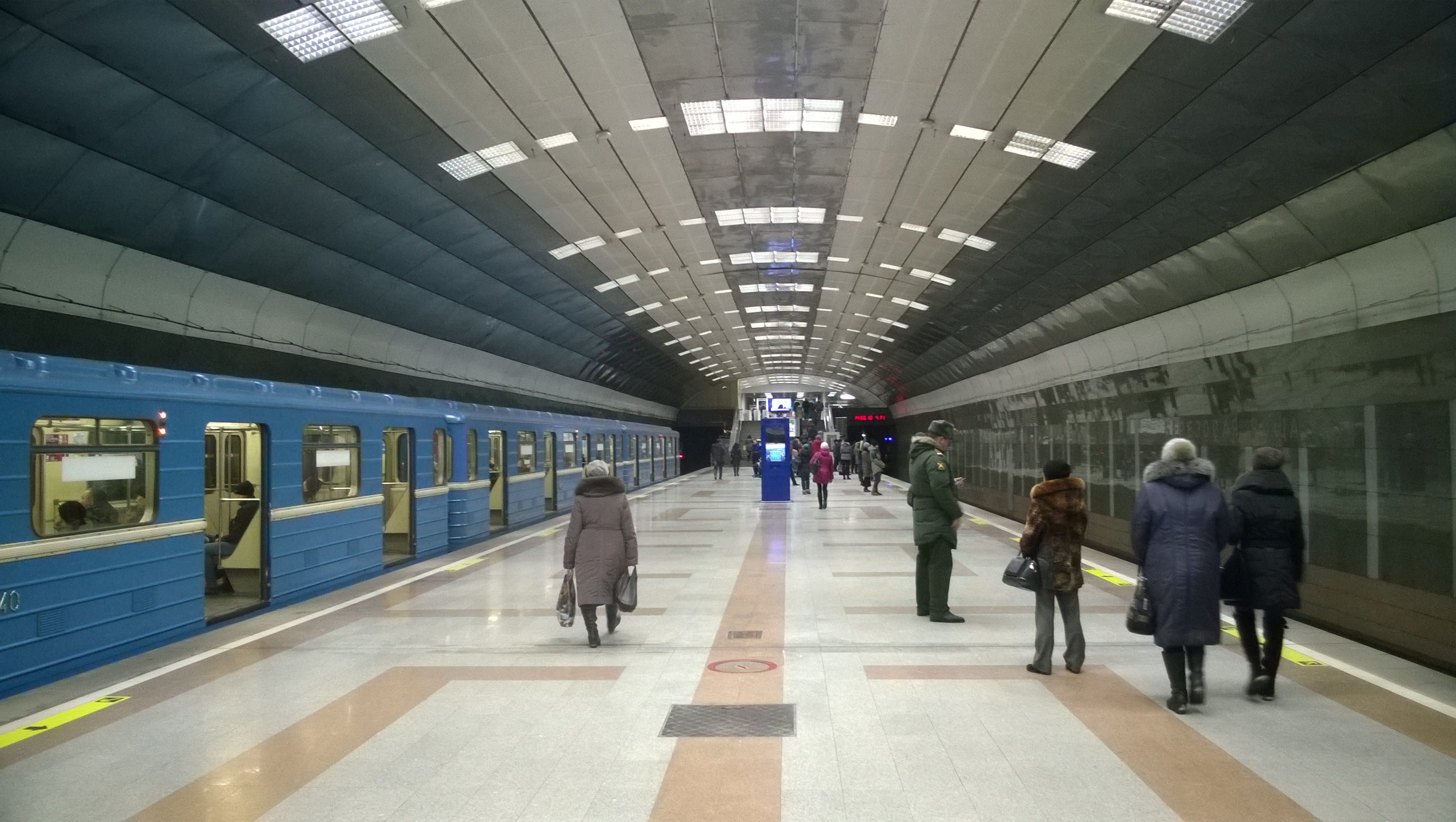
Beryozovaya Roshcha
