= Marshala Pokryshkina station =

Novosibirsk Metro Station

Marshala Pokryshkina

General information
- Coordinates: 55.043556°N 82.934908°E
- System: Novosibirsk Metro
- Owner: Novosibirsk Metro
- Line: Dzerzhinskaya Line
- Platforms: Island platform
- Tracks: 2

Construction
- Structure type: Underground

History
- Opened: December 28, 2000

Services
Preceding station	Novosibirsk Metro	Following station
Sibirskaya towards Ploshchad Garina-Mikhaylovskogo	Dzerzhinskaya Line	Beryozovaya Roshcha towards Zolotaya Niva
Location

Marshala Pokryshkina (Russian: Ма́ршала Покры́шкина) is a station on the Dzerzhinskaya Line of the Novosibirsk Metro, in Novosibirsk, Siberia, Russia. It opened on December 28, 2000.
