= Dzerzhinsky Prospekt, Novosibirsk =

Street in Novosibirsk, Russia

Dzerzhinsky Prospekt
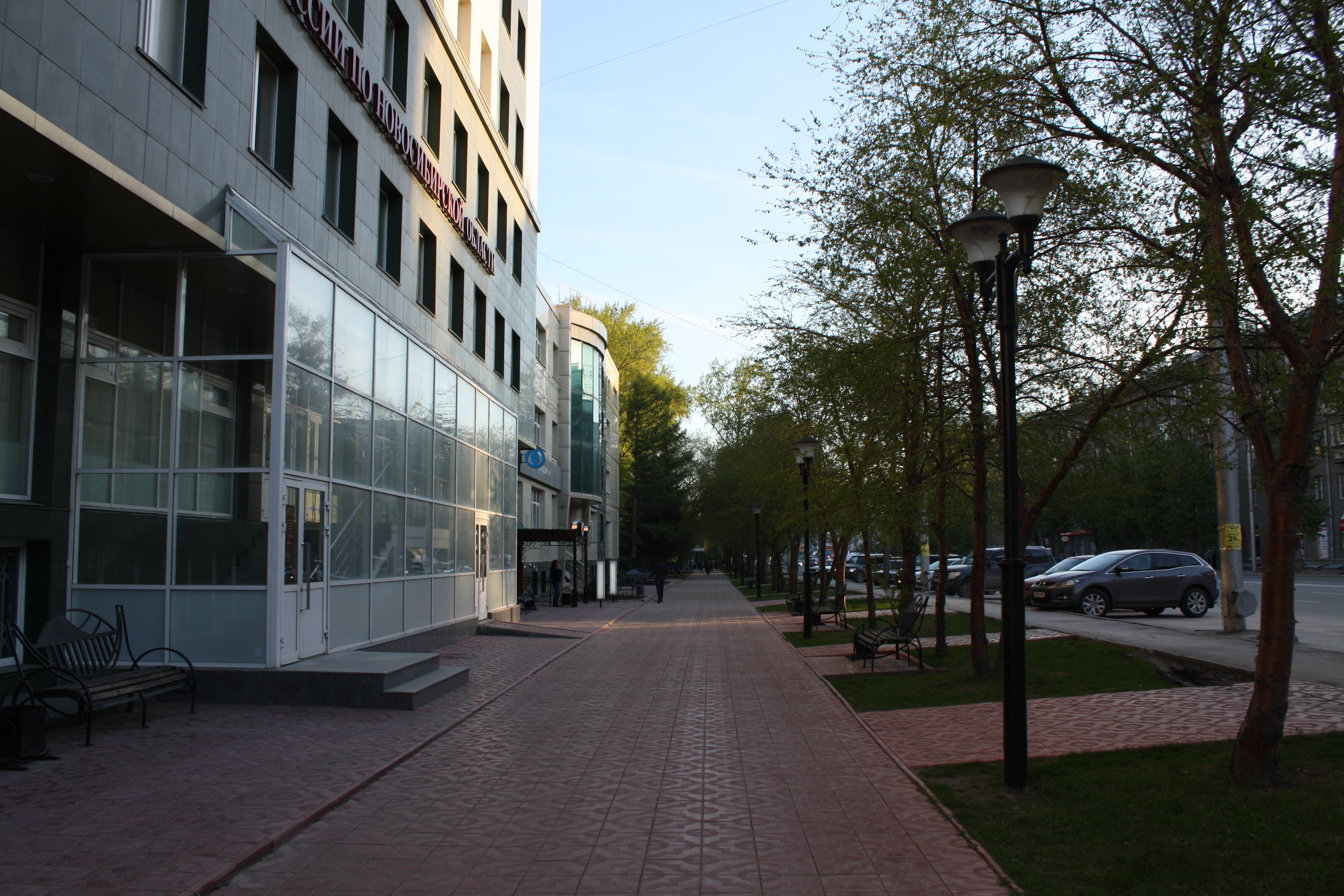
- Native name: Проспект Дзержинского (Russian)
- Length: 5.7 km (3.5 mi)
- Location: Novosibirsk; Russia
- Nearest metro station: Beryozovaya Roshcha

Dzerzhinsky Prospekt (Russian: Проспект Дзержинского) is a street in Dzerzhinsky City District of Novosibirsk, Russia. It starts from Seleznyov Street and runs northeast, crosses Koshurnikov, Krasin, Shakespeare, Korolyov, Volochayevskaya and Polzunov streets. The prospekt ends near the bridge over the Kamenka River. The length of the street is about 5.7 kilometers (3.5 mi).

== History ==
Dzerzhinsky Prospekt is one of the oldest roads in Novosibirsk. In the 17th and 18th centuries this road was part of Kalmyk Route which ran from Krivoshchyokovo (current Leninsky District of Novosibirsk) to Tomsk.

In 1948, Dzerzhinsky Prospekt 1 was built.

In 1957, the street was named after Felix Dzerzhinsky.

== Architecture ==
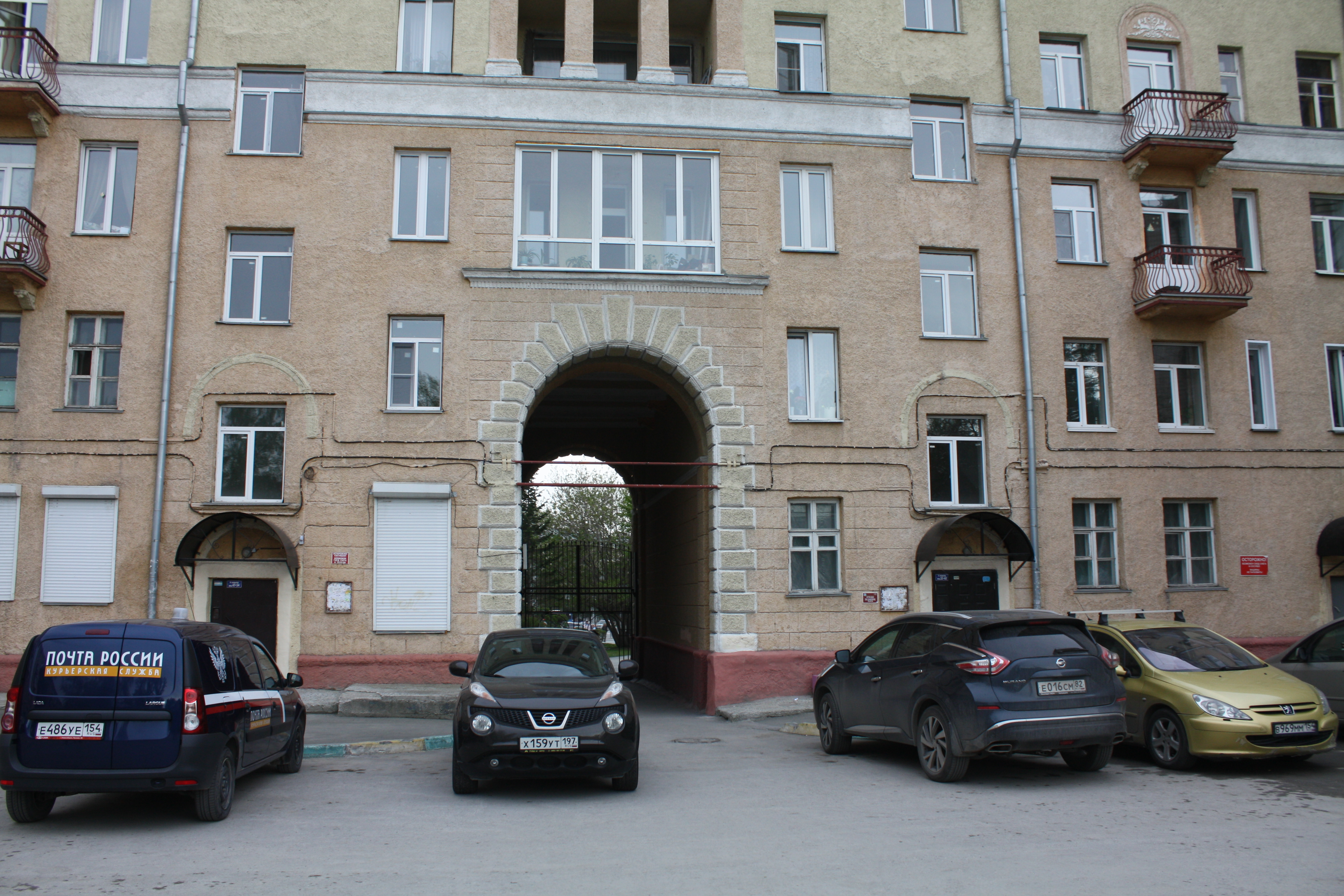
Dzerzhinsky Prospekt 1a

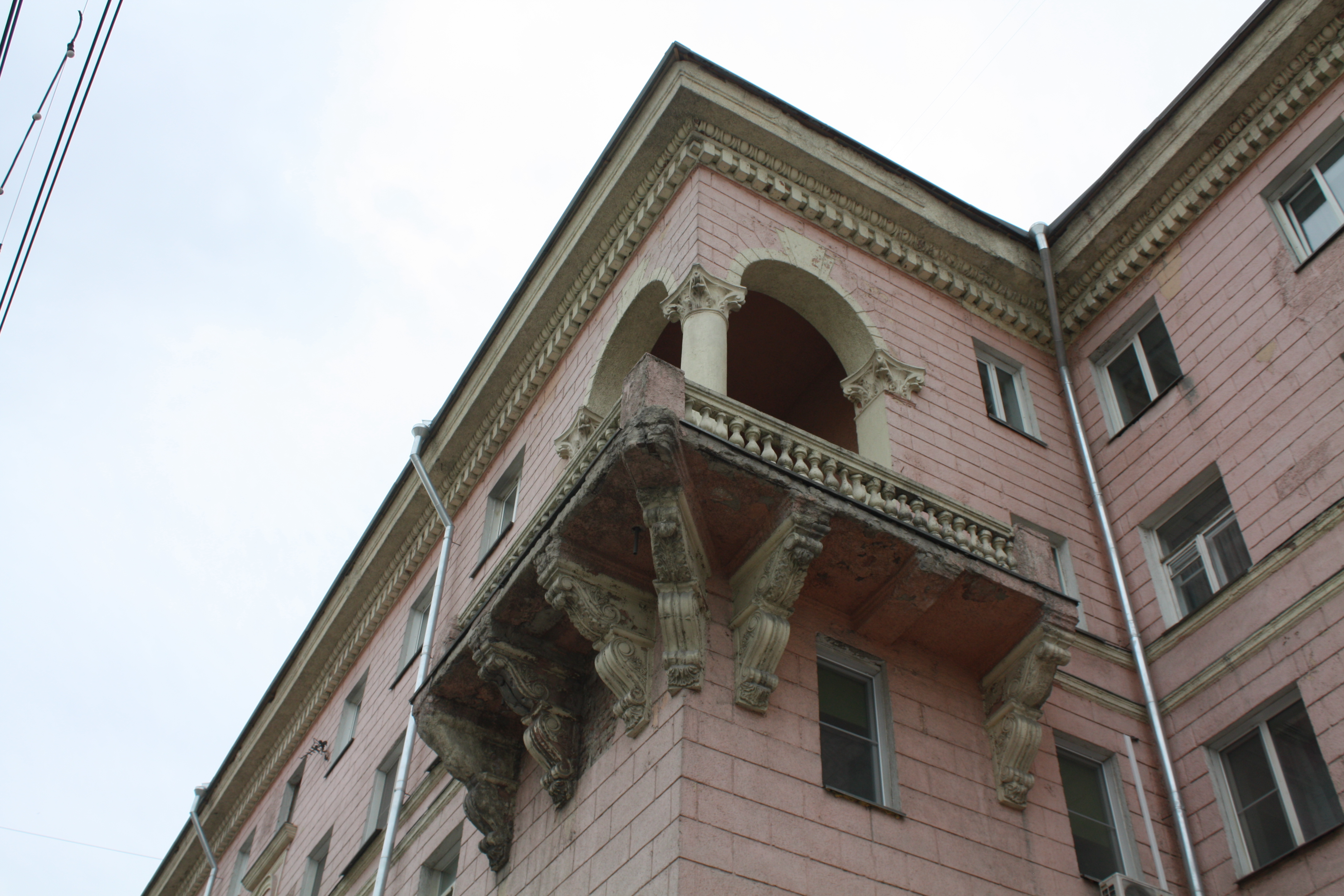
Dzerzhinsky Prospekt 7

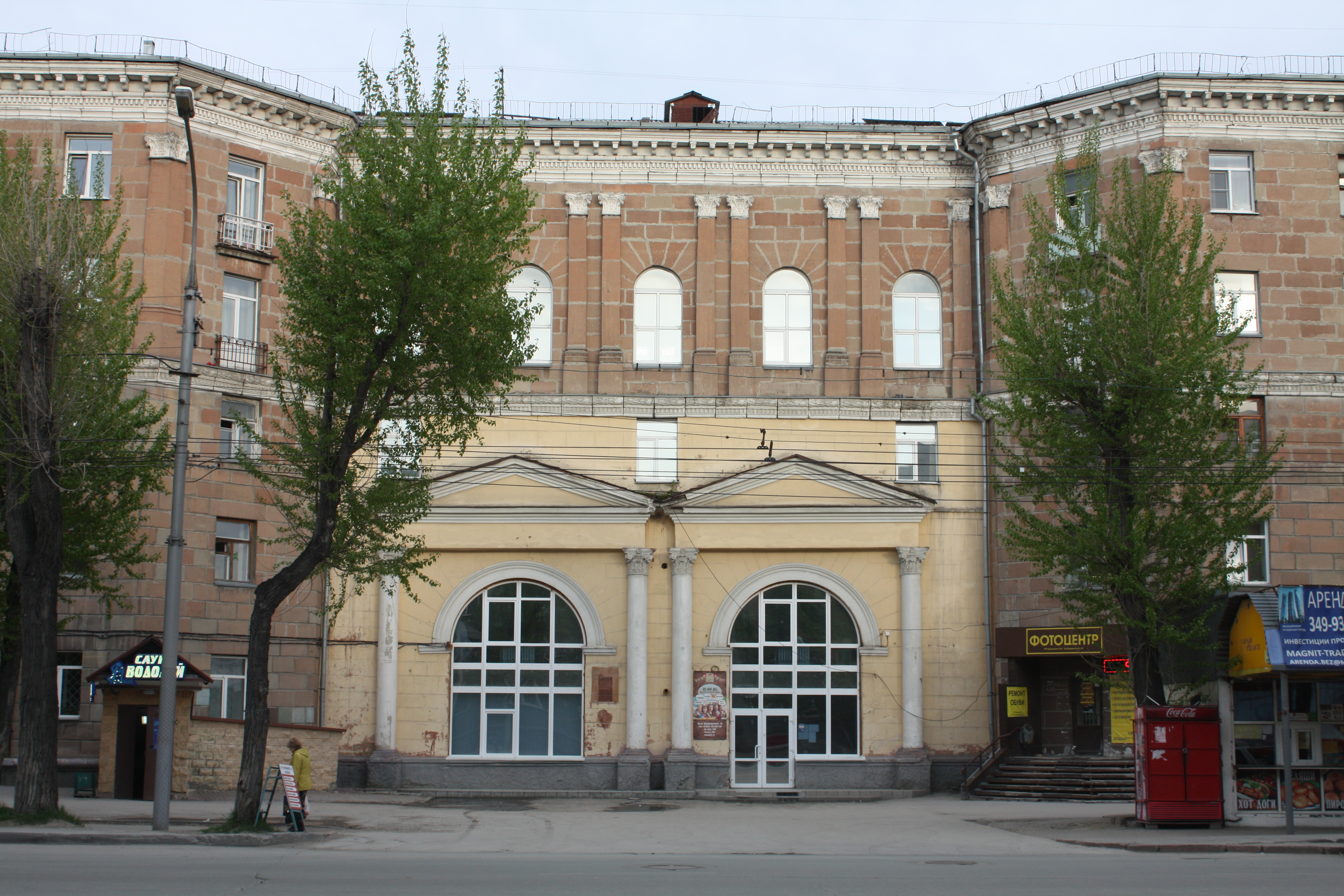
Dzerzhinsky Prospekt 18

== Organizations ==
- State Regional Center for Standardization, Metrology and Testing
- Dzerzhinsky District Administration

== Parks ==
- Beryozovaya Roshcha Park
- Dzerzhinsky Park

== Gallery ==
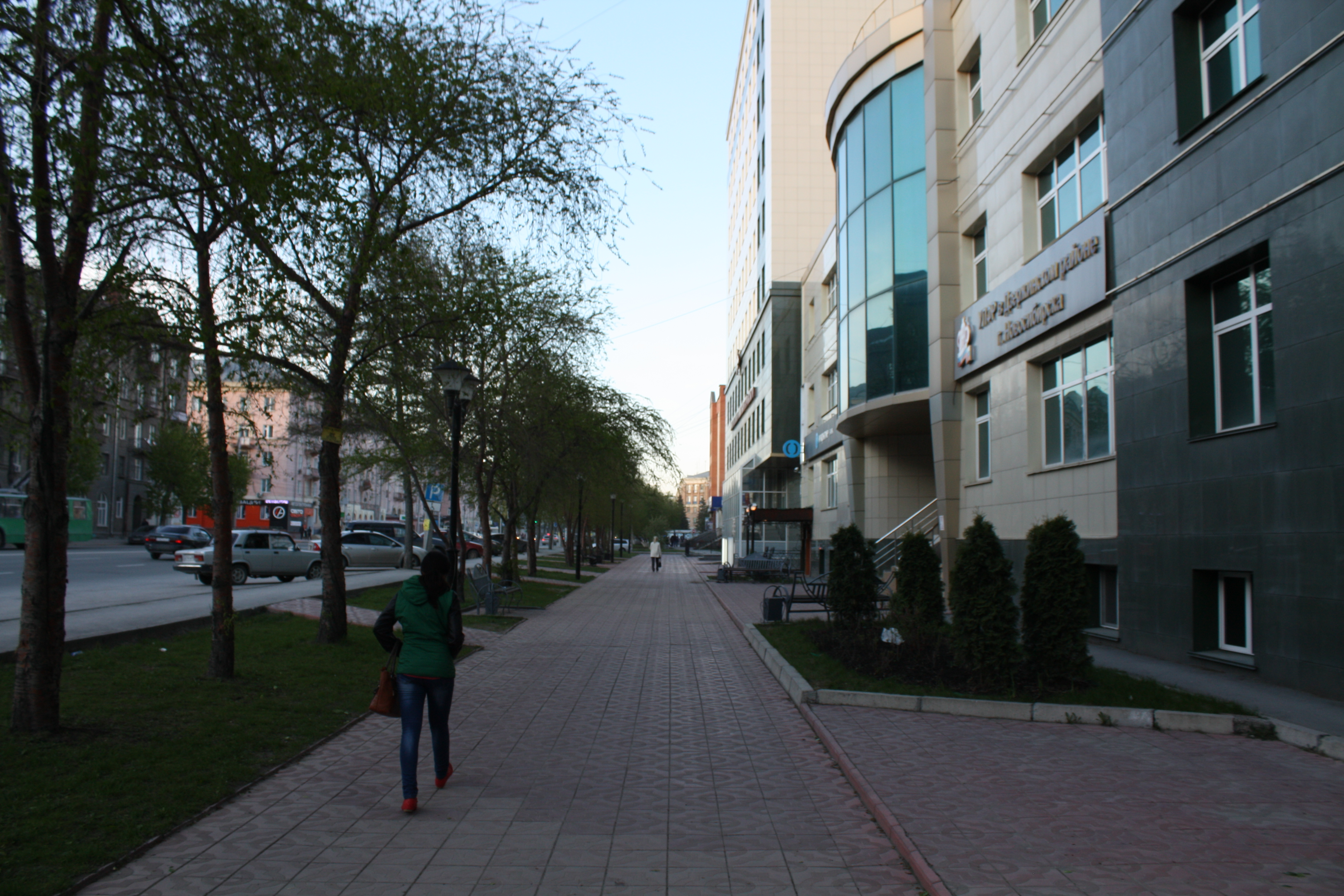

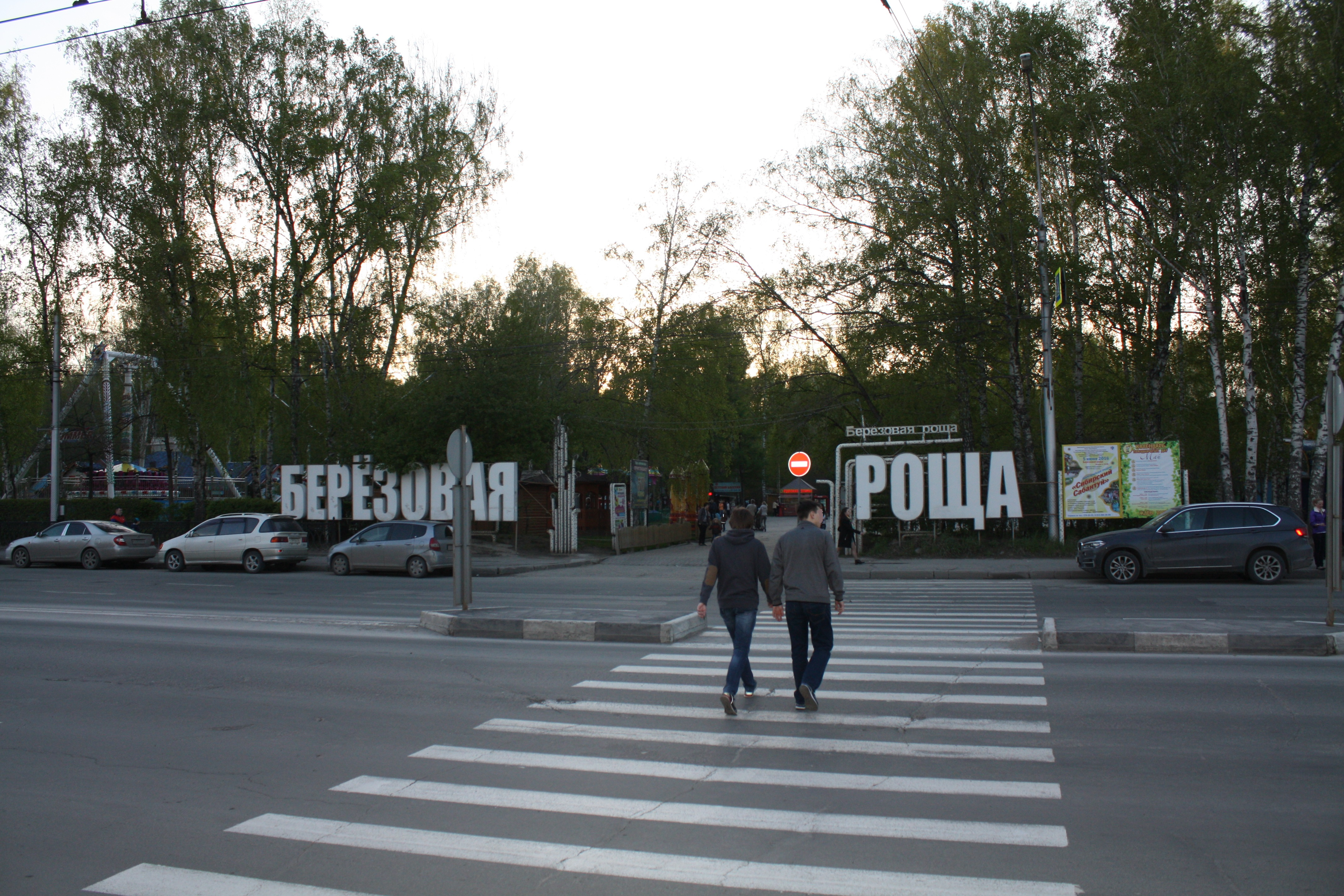

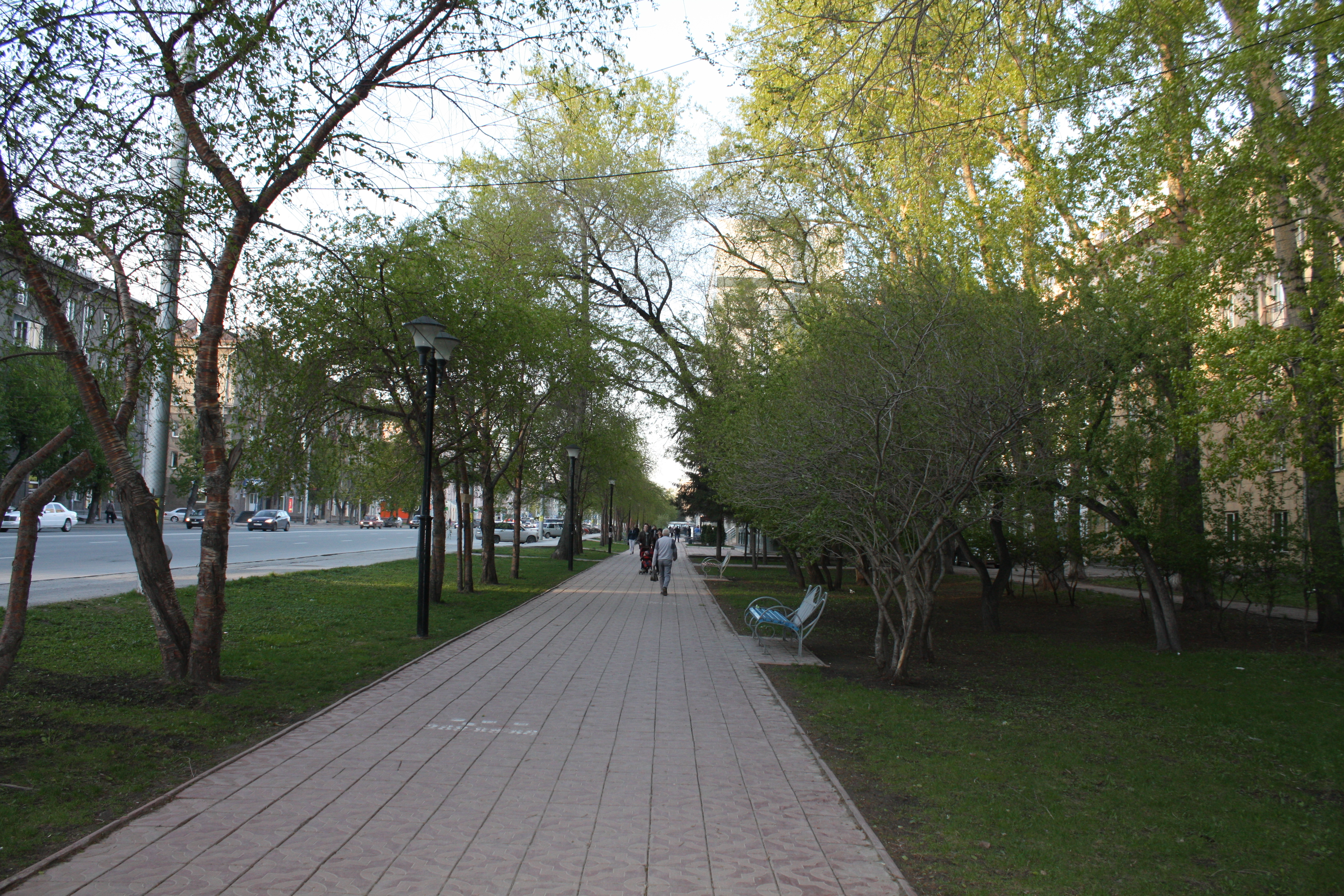

== Transportation ==
=== Metro ===
Entrance to Beryozovaya Roshcha Station is located between Dzerzhinsky Prospekt and Koshurnikov Street.

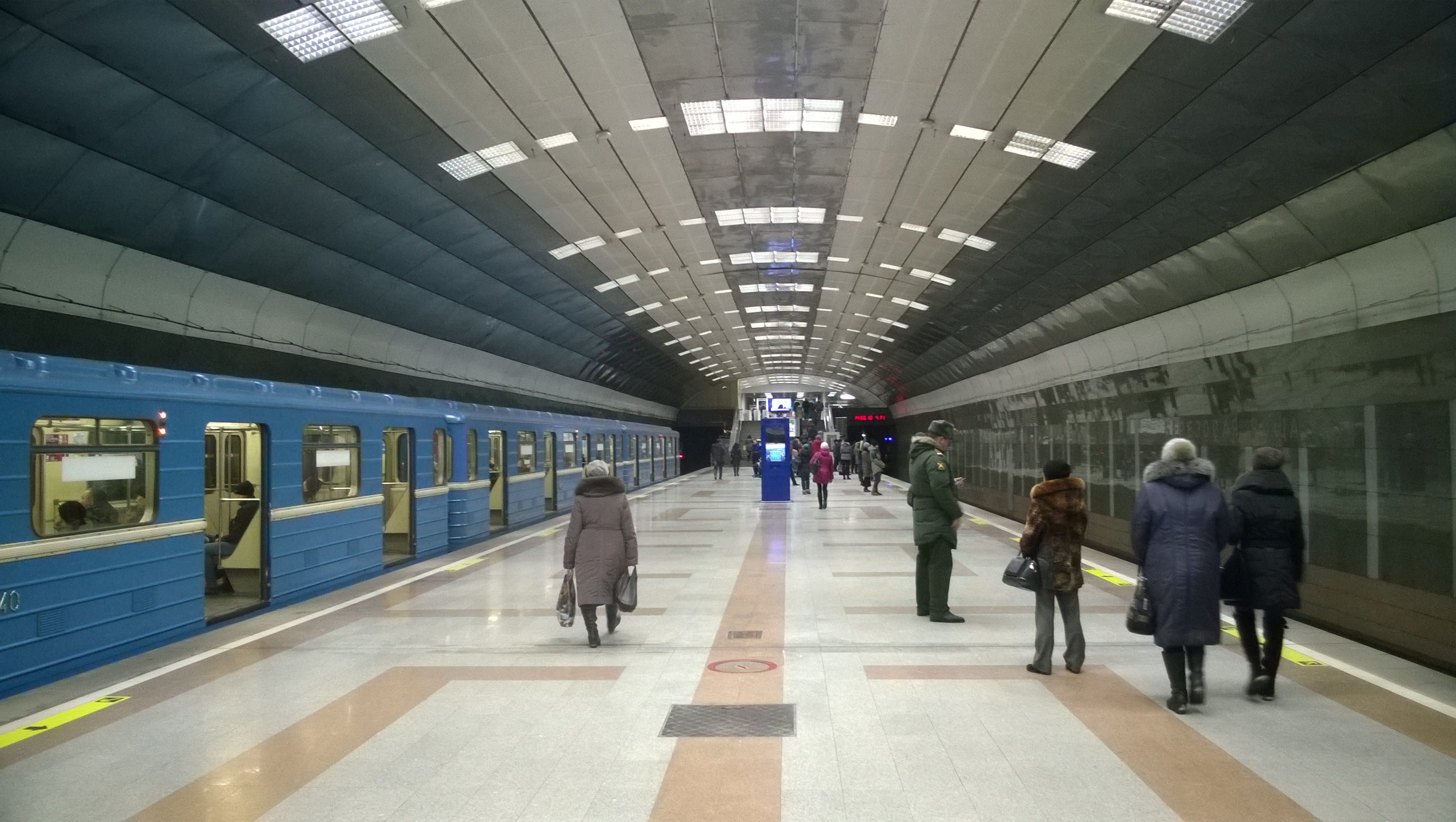
Beryozovaya Roshcha

== Notable residents ==
- Robert Bartini (1897–1974) was an Italian-born Soviet aircraft designer and scientist. He lived on Dzerzhinsky Prospekt 75 from 1952 to 1956.
