= Beryozovaya Roshcha station =

Novosibirsk Metro Station

Beryozovaya Roshcha
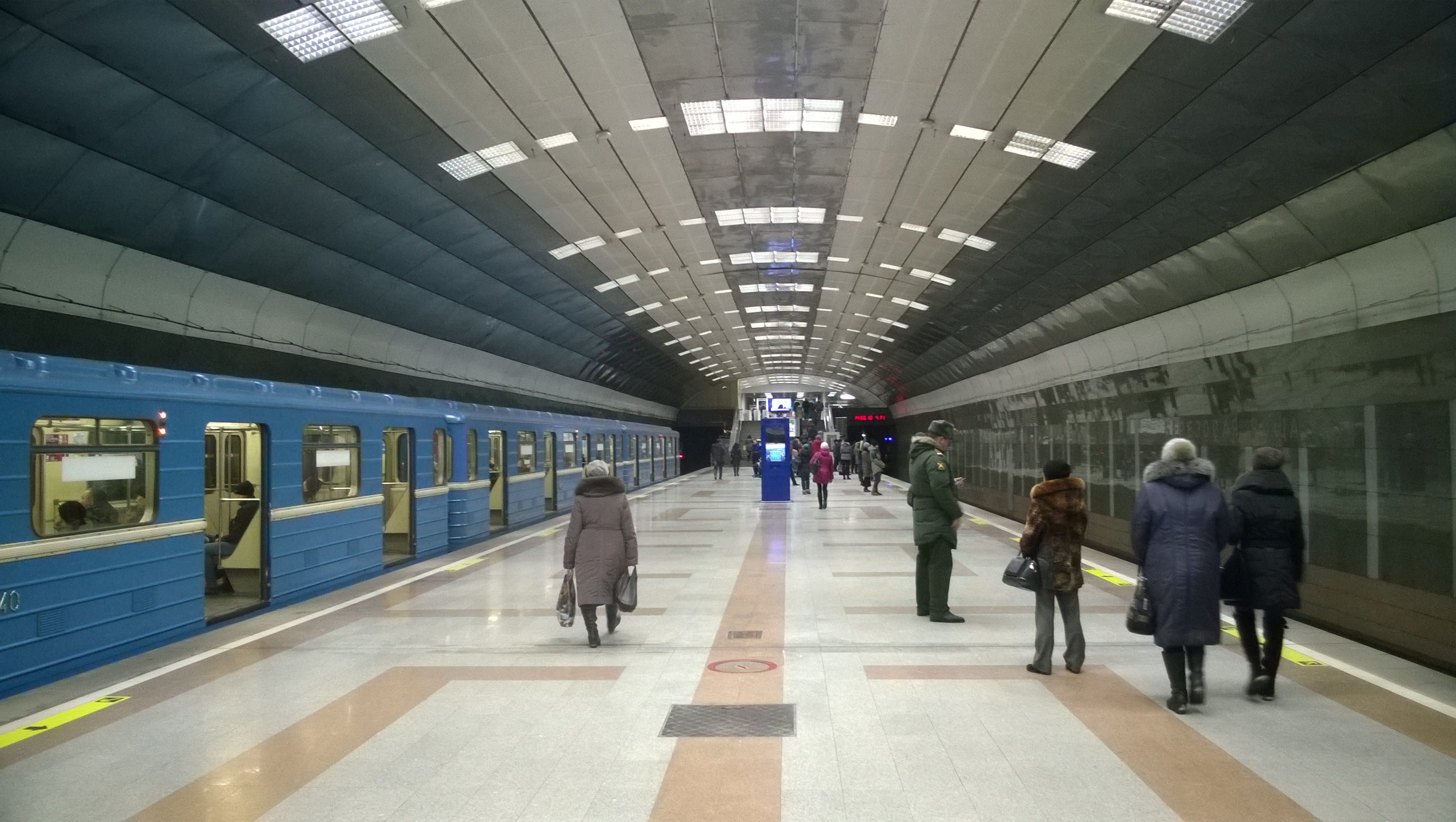
- Station Hall

General information
- Coordinates: 55.043333°N 82.953056°E
- System: Novosibirsk Metro
- Owner: Novosibirsk Metro
- Line: Dzerzhinskaya Line
- Platforms: Island platform
- Tracks: 2

Construction
- Structure type: Single-vault
- Depth: 10 metres (33 ft)

History
- Opened: June 25, 2005

Services
| Preceding station | Novosibirsk Metro | Following station |
|---|---|---|
| Marshala Pokryshkina towards Ploshchad Garina-Mikhaylovskogo | Dzerzhinskaya Line | Zolotaya Niva Terminus |
Location

Beryozovaya Roshcha (Russian: Берёзовая роща, "Birch Grove") is a station on the Dzerzhinskaya Line of the Novosibirsk Metro. It opened on June 25, 2005, becoming 12th station in the system. Beryozovaya Roshcha is located in Dzerzhinsky District under crossroad of Koshurnikov Street and Dzerzhinsky Prospekt.
