= Dzerzhinskaya Line =

The Dzerzhinskaya Line (Russian: Дзержи́нская ли́ния) is a Novosibirsk Metro line. Its history begins with the original Metro design plan, which despite numerous attempts could not make a provision to include the central railway terminal, something crucial for the Metro to become the city's main artery. Thus in early 1980s, whilst the construction of the first line was underway, construction started on a two-station second line which was opened in 1987, two years after the first line. It was originally intended that in the mid-'90s the construction of the westward extension would begin, however with the lack of finances that plan had to wait for more than ten years before the new stations could finally begin opening in the 2000s.

== Timeline ==
Segment	Opened
Ploshchad Garina-Mikhaylovskogo - Sibirskaya	31 December 1987
Sibirskaya - Marshala Pokryshkina	28 December 2000
Marshala Pokryshkina - Beryozovaya Roshcha	25 June 2005
Beryozovaya Roshcha - Zolotaya Niva	7 October 2010

== Connections ==
#	Transfer to	At
1	Leninskaya Line	Sibirskaya

== Rolling stock ==
Two four-car 81-717/714 shuttles are assigned to the line.

== Recent developments and future plans ==
Although the extension to Beryozovaya Roshcha was significant enough to end the shuttle service on the line, the station was opened with only one tunnel complete. The completion of the second one, originally intended for mid-2006, but delayed to 2007 finally allowed for a standard service to begin. The line was extended eastwards to Zolotaya Niva in 2010; and a further extension is planned to Dovatora and Volochaevskaya.
