= 2nd Yeltsovka River =

2nd Yeltsovka
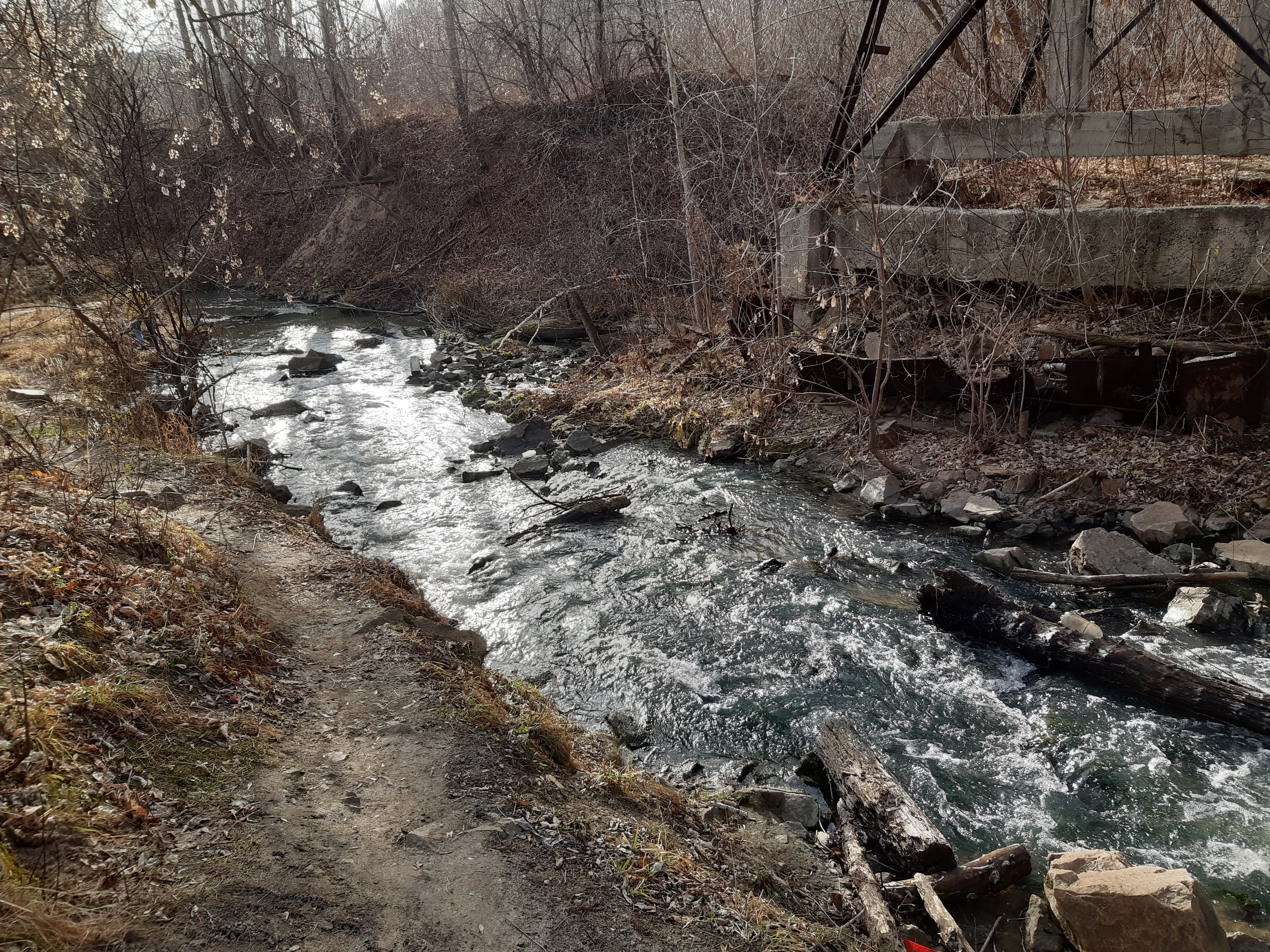
- Native name: 2-я Ельцовка (Russian)

Location
- Country: Russia
- Region: Novosibirsk Oblast

Physical characteristics
- Mouth: Ob
  - coordinates: 55°02′42″N 82°51′15″E
- Length: 14 km (8.7 mi)

Basin features
- Progression: Ob→ Kara Sea

The 2nd Yeltsovka (Russian: 2-я Ельцовка) is a small river in Novosibirsk Oblast, Russia, right tributary of the Ob. Its length is 14 km (8.7 mi), with a drainage basin of 42 square kilometres.

The 2nd Yeltsovka flows out of a small lake at the village of Klyukvenny, runs southwest through Novosibirsky District, then Kalininsky and Zayeltsovsky districts of Novosibirsk, flows into the Ob.

== Gallery ==
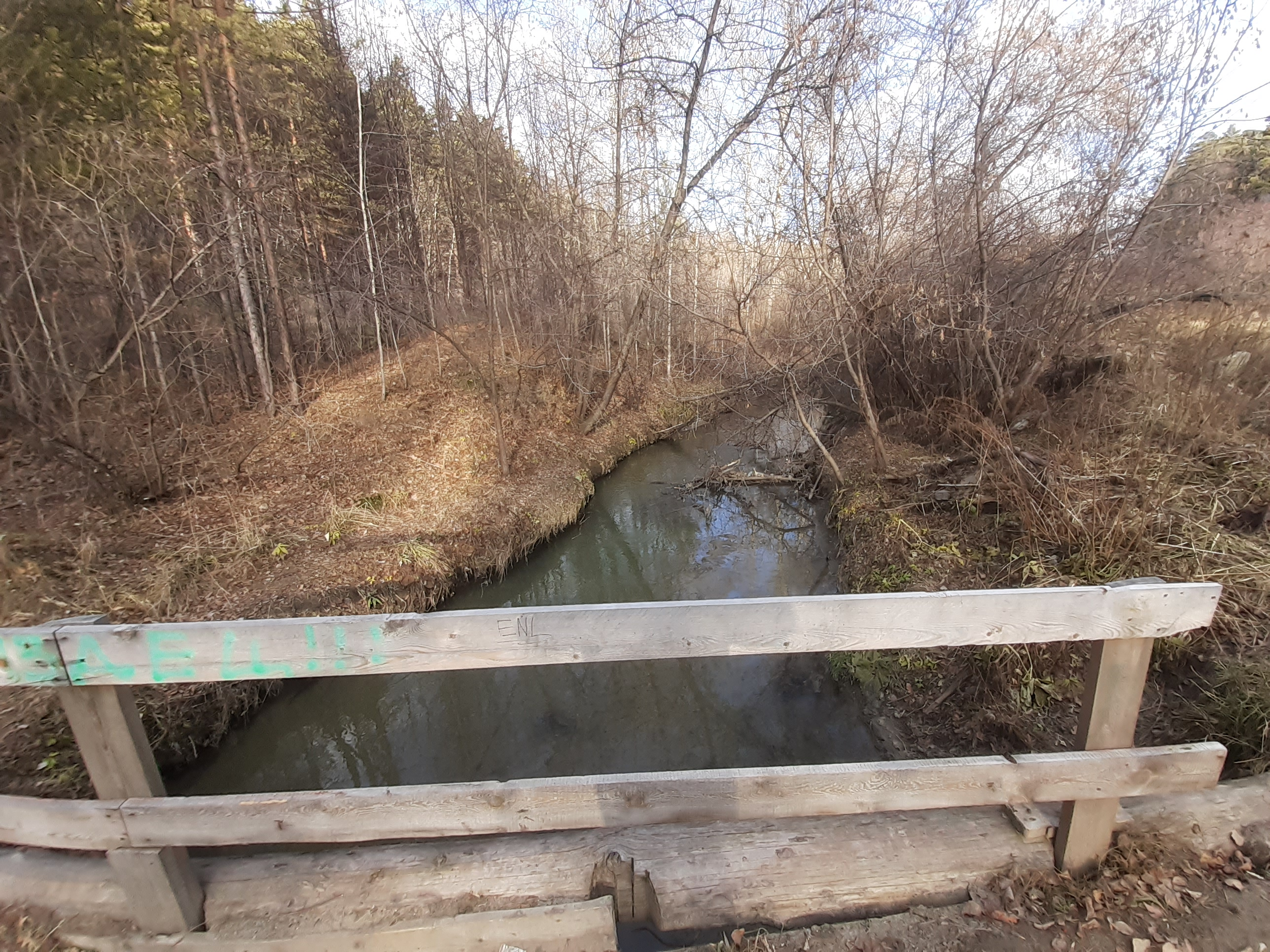

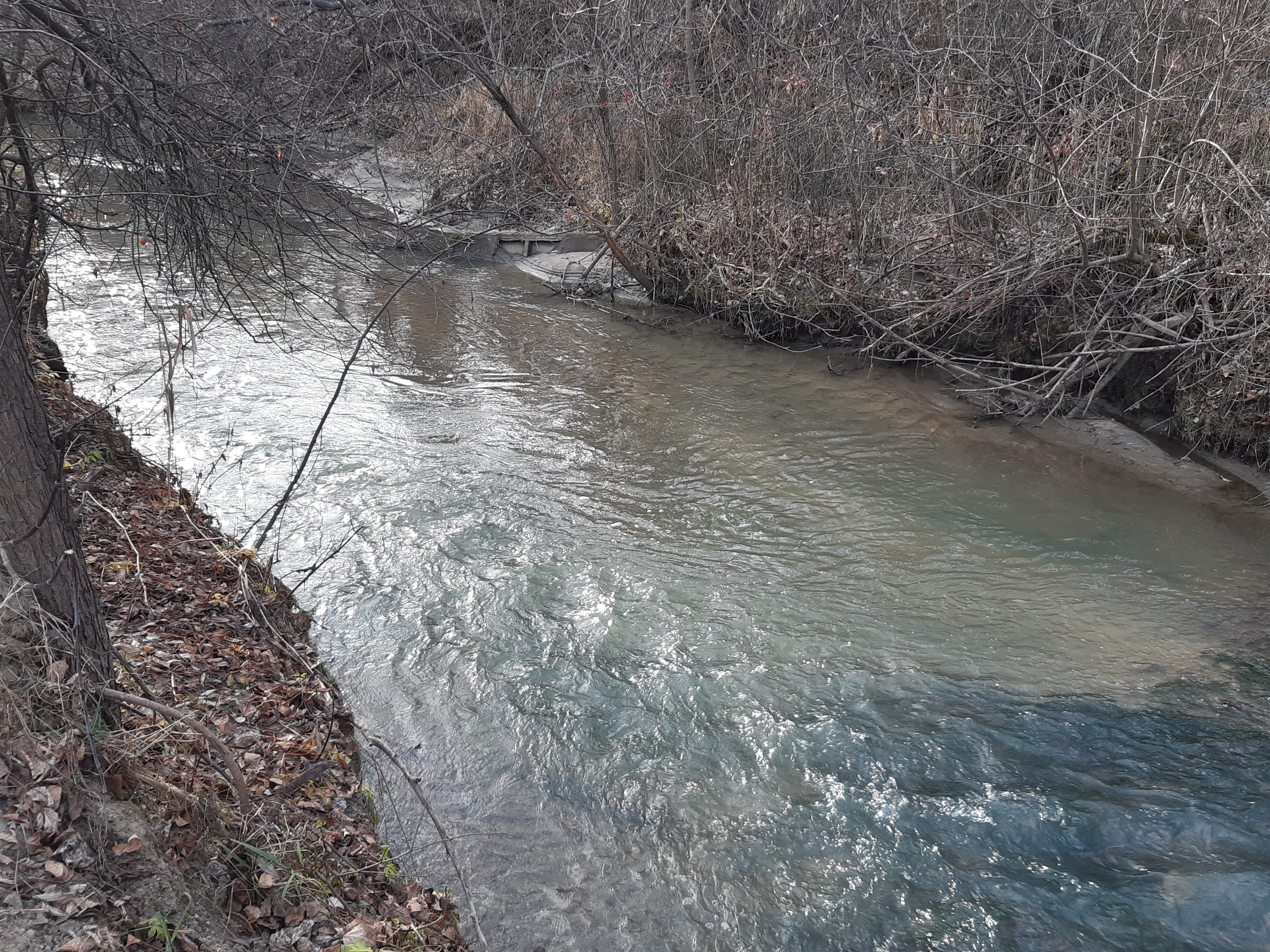

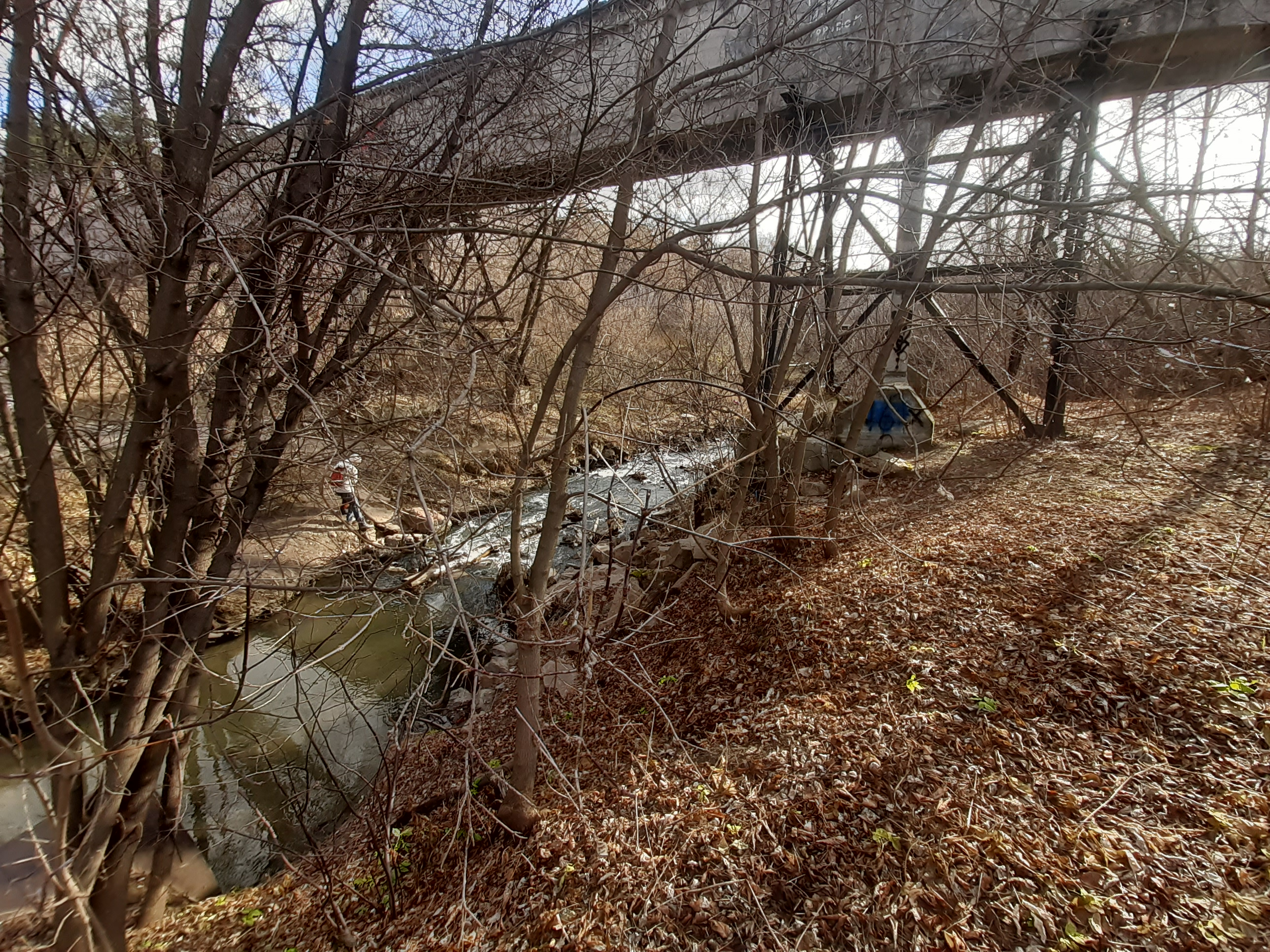

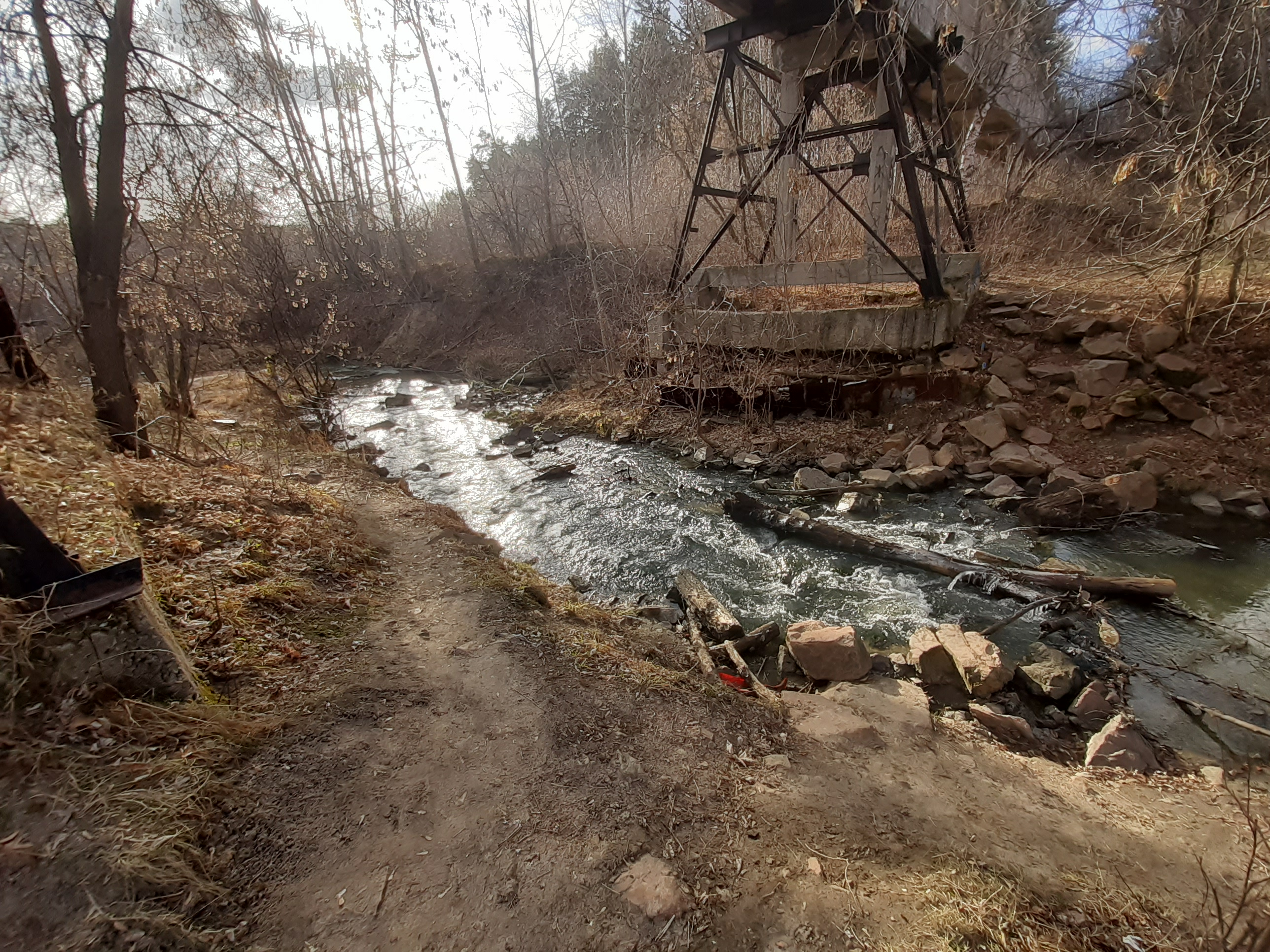

== See also ==
- Kamenka River
