= Kamenka (Ob) =

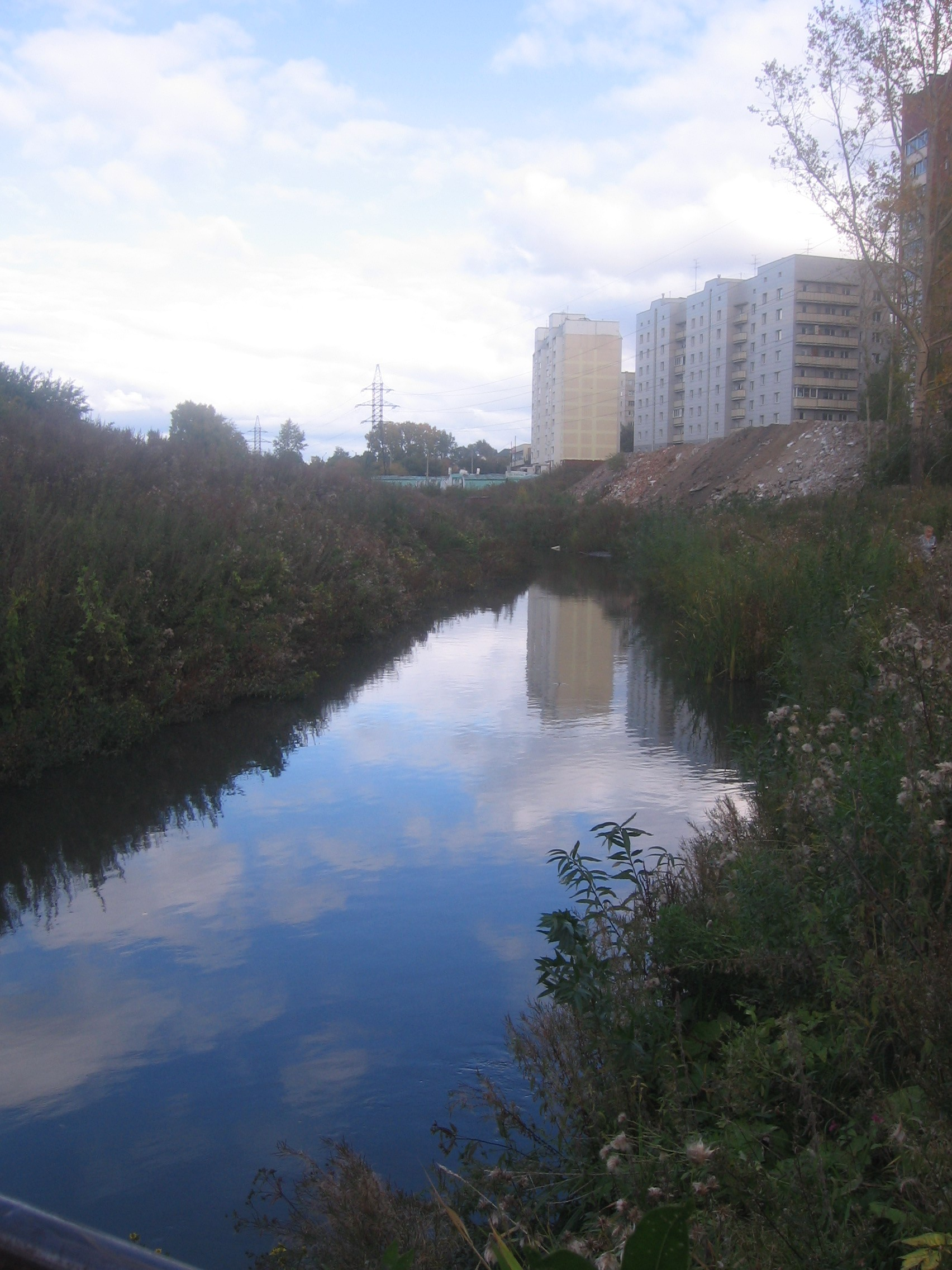
- Native name: Каменка (Russian)

Location
- Country: Russia
- Region: Novosibirsk Oblast

Physical characteristics
- Mouth: Ob
  - coordinates: 55.0175°N 82.9145°E
- Length: 25 km (16 mi)

Basin features
- Progression: Ob→ Kara Sea

The Kamenka (Russian: Каменка) is a small river in Novosibirsk Oblast, Russia. Its length is 25 km (16 mi), with a drainage basin of 130 square kilometres.

The river rises in the swamp near Leninsky Settlement and runs southwest through the following settlements: Vitaminka, Sovetsky, Voskhod and Kamenka Village, then flows through the Dzerzhinsky, Tsentralny and Oktyabrsky city districts of Novosibirsk.

== Gallery ==
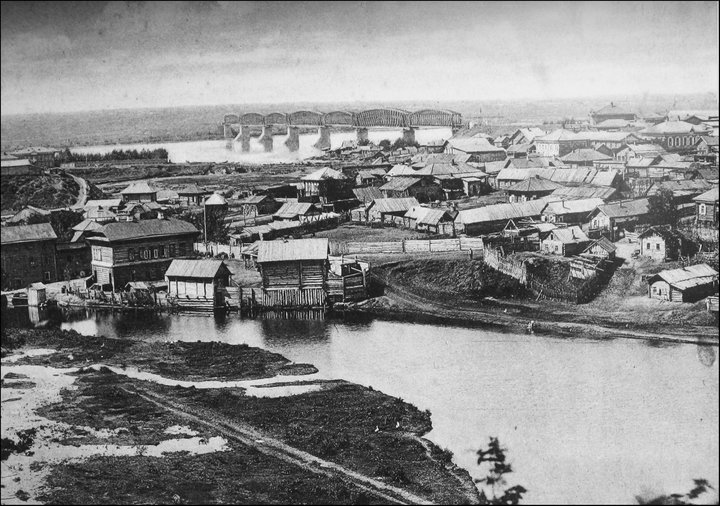

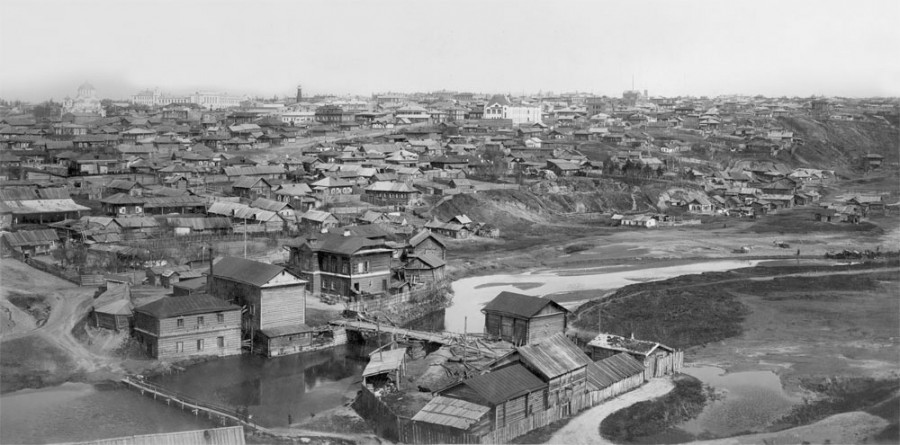

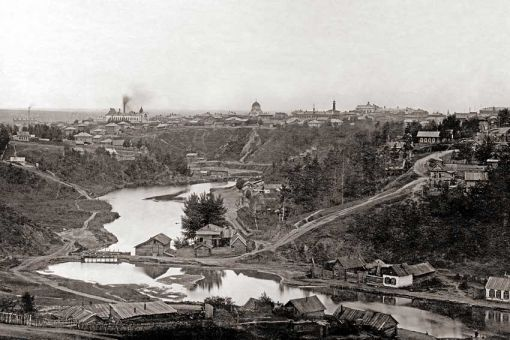

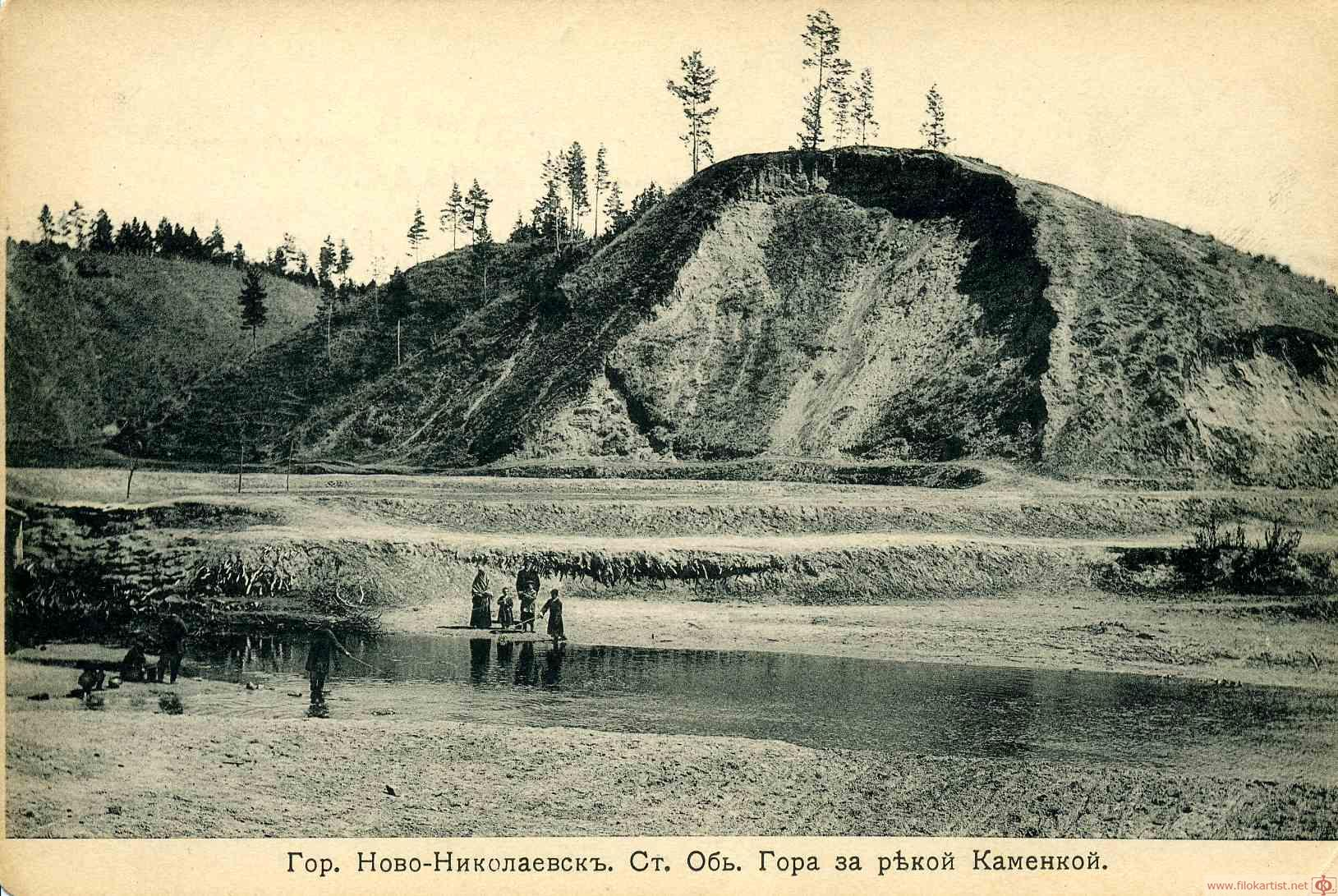

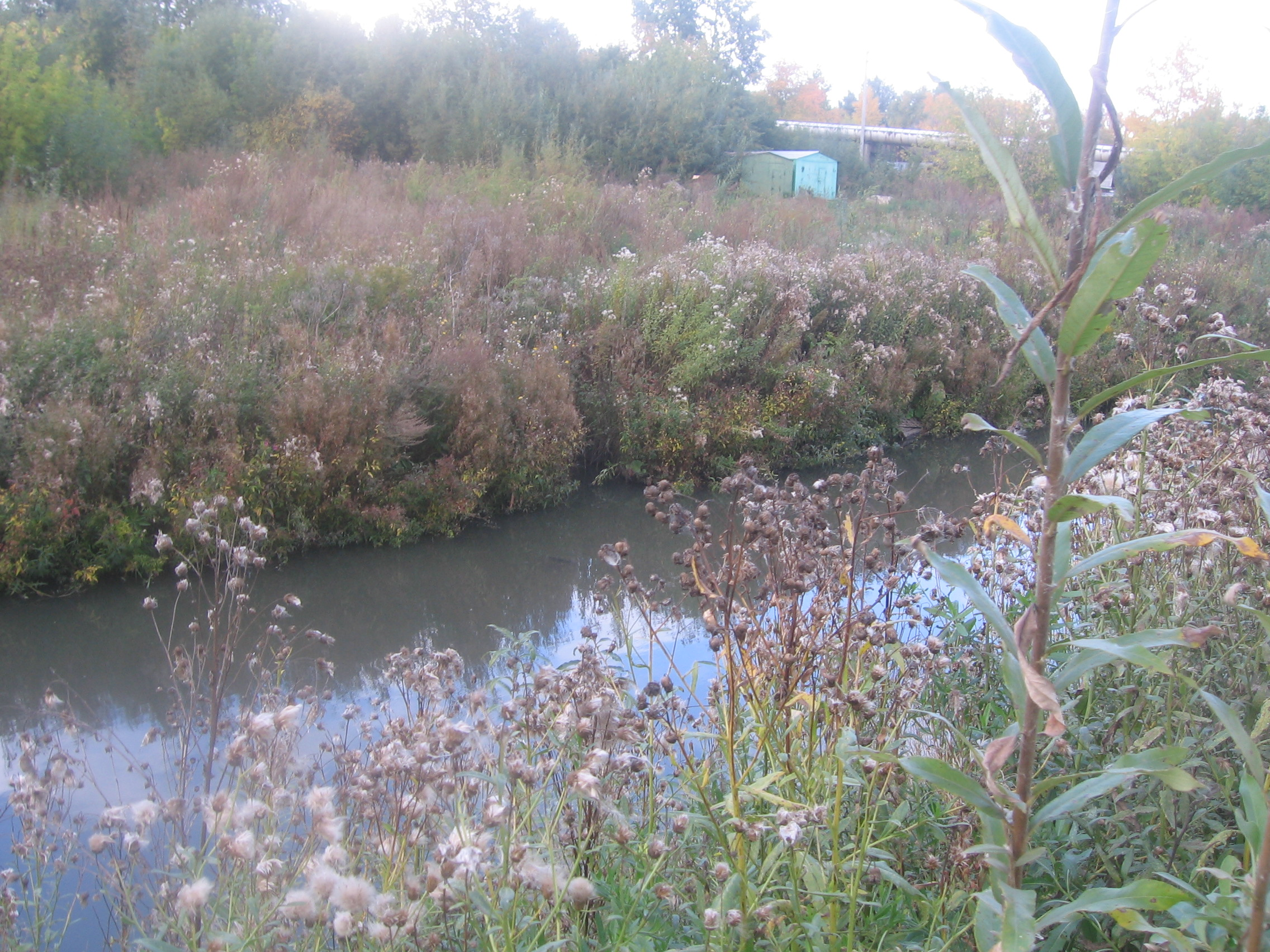

== See also ==
- 2nd Yeltsovka River
- Yeltsovka River (lower tributary of Ob River)
