= Zolotaya Niva station =

Novosibirsk Metro Station

Zolotaya Niva
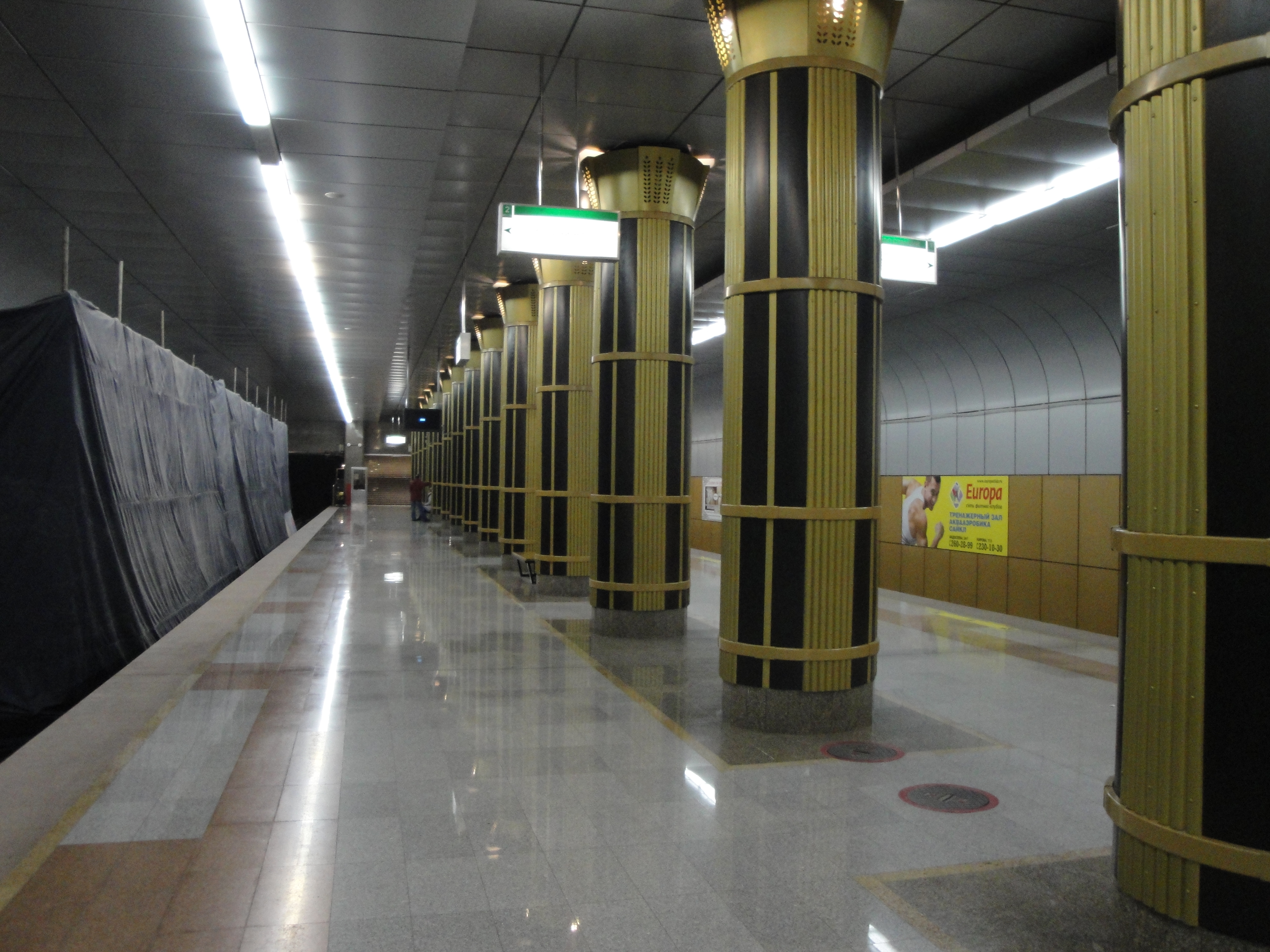
- Platforms at Zolotaya Niva station

General information
- Coordinates: 55.037617°N 82.976636°E
- System: Novosibirsk Metro
- Line: Dzerzhinskaya Line
- Platforms: 1
- Tracks: 2

Construction
- Depth: 10 m (33 ft)
- Platform levels: 1
- Parking: No
- Cycle facilities: yes

History
- Opened: 7 October 2010
- Electrified: 825 V DC

Key dates
- 26 October 2010: Closed
- 9 February 2011: Reopened

Services
Preceding station	Novosibirsk Metro	Following station
Beryozovaya Roshcha towards Ploshchad Garina-Mikhaylovskogo	Dzerzhinskaya Line	Terminus
Location

Zolotaya Niva (Russian: Золотая нива (Golden Field) ) is a station of the Dzerzhinskaya Line of Novosibirsk Metro, Novosibirsk, Russia. It was opened on 7 October 2010. Station was closed on 26 October 2010 and then reopened on 9 February 2011.
