= Ploshchad Garina-Mikhaylovskogo station =

Novosibirsk Metro Station

Ploshchad Garina-Mikhaylovskogo
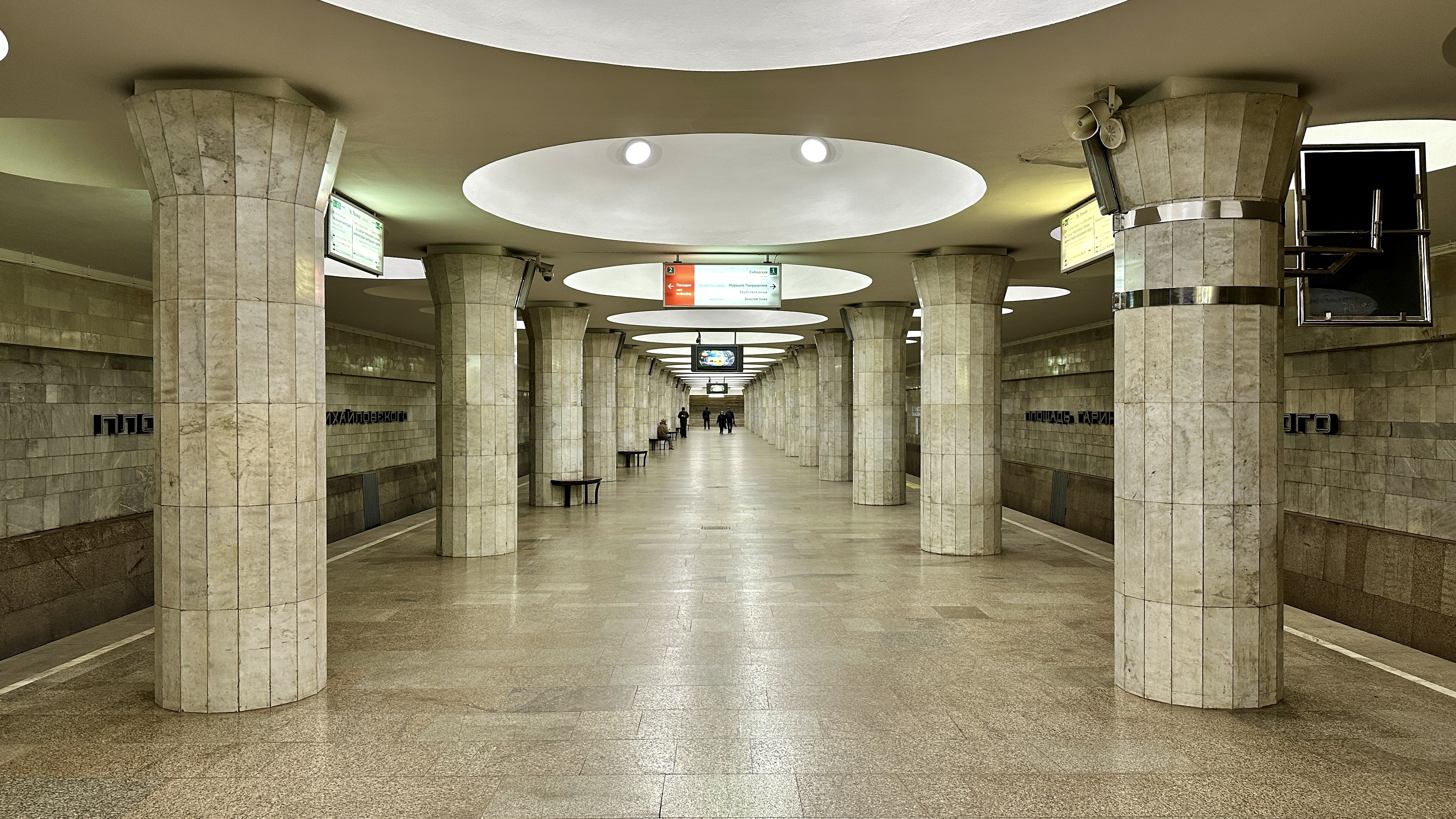

General information
- Coordinates: 55.035833°N 82.9°E
- System: Novosibirsk Metro
- Owner: Novosibirsk Metro
- Line: Dzerzhinskaya Line
- Platforms: Island platform
- Tracks: 2

Construction
- Structure type: Underground

History
- Opened: 31 December 1987

Services
Preceding station	Novosibirsk Metro	Following station
Terminus	Dzerzhinskaya Line	Sibirskaya towards Zolotaya Niva
Location

Ploshchad Garina-Mikhaylovskogo (Russian: Пло́щадь Га́рина-Михайло́вского) is an underground station of the Novosibirsk Metro, located in Zheleznodorozhny District of Novosibirsk, Russia. It was opened on 31 December 1987 as part of the first section of the Dzerzhinskaya Line.

Constructed as a shallow column station, Ploshchad Garina-Mikhaylovskogo features round columns clad in light grey marble. The ceiling was designed as a series of individual domes housing light fixtures.

The station has two vestibules that provide access to Garin-Mikhaylovsky Square, which is located above the station. The southern vestibule connects to the main and suburban terminals of Novosibirsk railway station.
